= Typha × argoviensis =

Scientific classification
- Kingdom: Plantae
- Clade: Tracheophytes
- Clade: Angiosperms
- Clade: Monocots
- Clade: Commelinids
- Order: Poales
- Family: Typhaceae
- Genus: Typha
- Species: T. × argoviensis

Binomial name
- Typha × argoviensis Hausskn. ex Asch. & Graebn

Species of plant

Typha × argoviensis is a plant of hybrid origin, native to Switzerland and Germany. It apparently originated as a cross between the two very widespread species T. latifolia and T. shuttleworthii. Typha × argoviensis grows in freshwater marshes.
