= Typha × bavarica =

Scientific classification
- Kingdom: Plantae
- Clade: Tracheophytes
- Clade: Angiosperms
- Clade: Monocots
- Clade: Commelinids
- Order: Poales
- Family: Typhaceae
- Genus: Typha
- Species: T. × bavarica

Binomial name
- Typha × bavarica Graebn. in H.G.A.Engler

Species of aquatic plant

Typha × bavarica is a plant of hybrid origin, endemic to southern Germany. It apparently originated as a cross between the two very widespread species T. angustifolia and T. shuttleworthii. Typha × bavarica grows in freshwater marshes.
