= Typha × gezei =

Scientific classification
- Kingdom: Plantae
- Clade: Tracheophytes
- Clade: Angiosperms
- Clade: Monocots
- Clade: Commelinids
- Order: Poales
- Family: Typhaceae
- Genus: Typha
- Species: T. × gezei

Binomial name
- Typha × gezei Rothm.

Species of aquatic plant

Typha × gezei is a plant of hybrid origin, endemic to France. It apparently originated as a cross between the two very widespread species T. domingensis and T. angustifolia. Typha × gezei grows in freshwater marshes.
