= Typha × provincialis =

Scientific classification
- Kingdom: Plantae
- Clade: Tracheophytes
- Clade: Angiosperms
- Clade: Monocots
- Clade: Commelinids
- Order: Poales
- Family: Typhaceae
- Genus: Typha
- Species: T. × provincialis

Binomial name
- Typha × provincialis A.Camus

Species of aquatic plant

Typha × provincialis is a plant of hybrid origin, endemic to southern France. Type collection was obtained from near St. Tropez in Provence. It apparently originated as a cross between the two very widespread species T. domingensis and T. latifolia. Typha × provincialis grows in freshwater marshes.
