= Typha grossheimii =

Conservation status
- Least Concern (IUCN 3.1)

Scientific classification
- Kingdom: Plantae
- Clade: Tracheophytes
- Clade: Angiosperms
- Clade: Monocots
- Clade: Commelinids
- Order: Poales
- Family: Typhaceae
- Genus: Typha
- Species: T. grossheimii

Binomial name
- Typha grossheimii Pobed.

Species of plant

Typha grossheimii is a plant species native to Iran, Iraq, Uzbekistan, Afghanistan, Kazakhstan, Kyrgyzstan, Azerbaijan, Armenia, and the Republic of Georgia.
