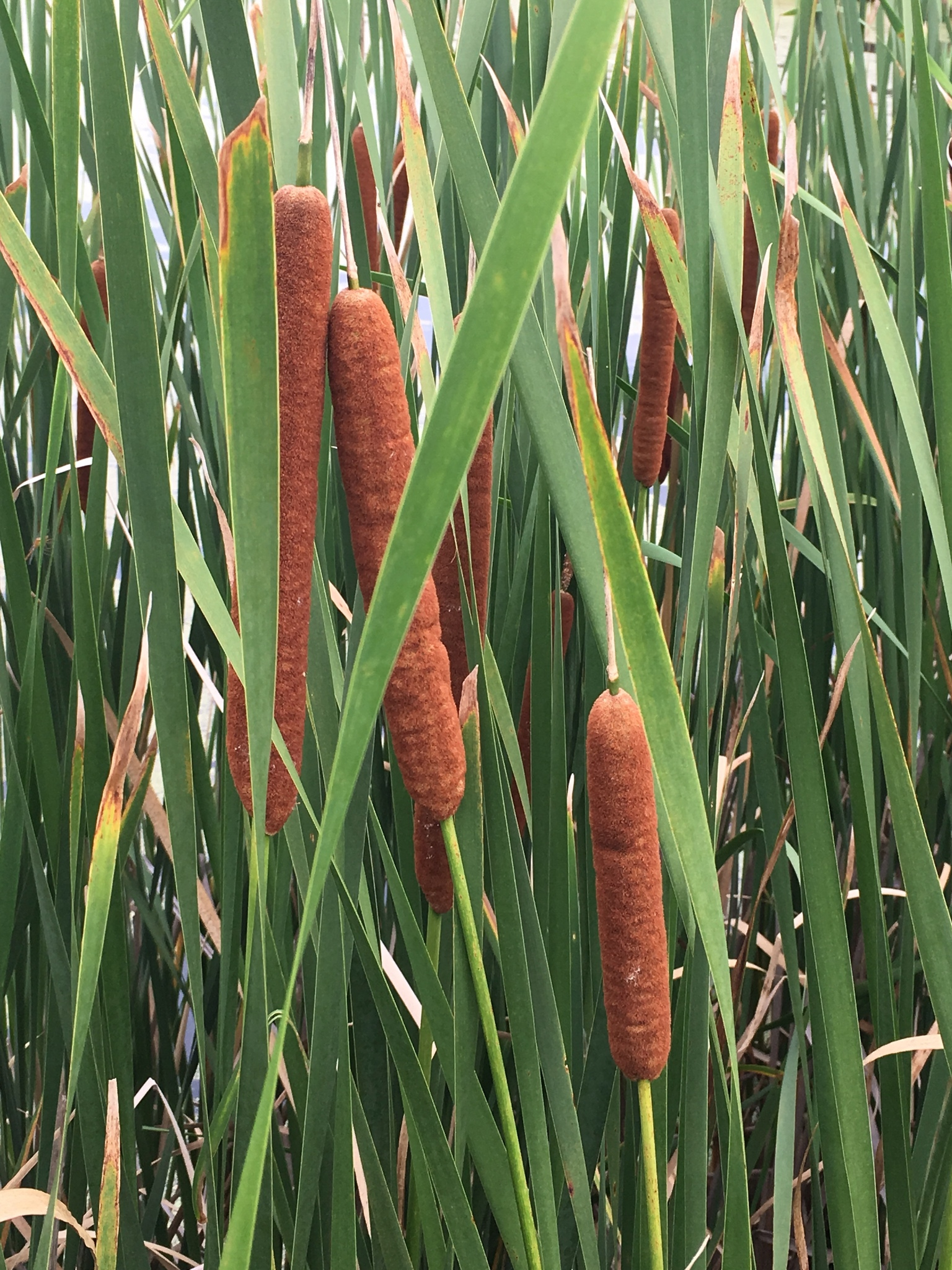

Scientific classification
- Kingdom: Plantae
- Clade: Tracheophytes
- Clade: Angiosperms
- Clade: Monocots
- Clade: Commelinids
- Order: Poales
- Family: Typhaceae
- Genus: Typha
- Species: T. × glauca

Binomial name
- Typha × glauca Godr.

= Typha × glauca =

Species of aquatic plant

Typha × glauca is a hybrid species of plant originating as a cross between T. angustifolia and T. latifolia. It shows invasive behavior in the Midwestern United States

Typha × glauca is an invasive hybrid species that originates as a cross between parent species, Typha angustifolia and Typha latifolia. T. latifolia is a broad-leaved cattail and T. angustifolia is a narrow-leaved cattail. The structure of Typha × glauca is an intermediate of its two parent species. It is an erect and emergent wetland plant that typically has an underwater base. Its habitat consists of wetlands, lakeshores, river backwaters, roadside ditches, disturbed wet areas, consistently damp patches of yards, areas with wet soil, and nutrient rich or slightly saline soils. Identification of this species can be difficult as it is a hybrid species and may be confused with its parent species. These cattails are typically between four and twelve inches.

Its leaves originate at the base of the stems and spread outward as they rise. The leaves are long, swordlike, and spongy and have parallel veins. The hybrid cattail’s leaves are typically 0.4-0.6” wide and often taller than the parent plants. The top of the leaf sheath has thin, ear-shaped lobes at the junction with the blade that often disappear in the summer. The inflorescences appear as a velvety brown, cylindrical spike that is located at the ends of the stem. The male portion is located above the female portion. The hybrid cattail has a 0.2-2” gap between the male and female flowers, a longer and thicker female flower section, and longer leaves. There is one seed in each of the single, tiny fruits in each flower. One plant can produce up to 250,000 seeds which would be wind-dispersed.

There are three cattail species that are commonly found in the upper Midwest of the United states. The common cattail (Typha latifolia) is native throughout North America and Eurasia. The narrow-leaved cattail (Typha angustifolia) is native to Eurasia but now well established throughout the United States. These cattails are abundant in the Midwest where they hybridize to form Typha × glauca. The original range of the hybrid includes the entire range of its parental species. It inhabits and invades wetland regions throughout the upper midwest of the United States.

The Typha species of cattail has been found to have a significantly high tolerance for some metals. These metals include copper and nickel. It appears that the plant has an internal tolerance mechanism for these metals that is inherent in the species. The Typha × glauca hybrid is also known for its ability to tolerate a variety of water depths as well as salinity levels. In terms of weather, the plant is also able to withstand widely variable hydroperiods and drought conditions. It does so by producing rhizomes that extend 1–2 meters below the soil surface, allowing it to survive prolonged inundation. It has been found to be able to survive temperatures as low as -13 degrees Celsius, and occupy an altitudinal range from 0 to 1800 meters. The plant seedlings are also able to tolerate anaerobic conditions, however, mature plants are not.

== Invasion tactics ==
This specific hybrid is known for its aggressiveness which aids its ability to invade new areas. It is able to spread rapidly and dominate the area, creating a large ecological impact. It is thought to promote dominance through two ecological mechanisms, modifying habitat conditions through litter, and the live plants altering conditions and outcompeting for resources. Typha is known to have a high litter biomass, as the plant is highly productive and slow to decompose. The high biomass of litter alters conditions by reducing the amount of space available for other competing organisms, changing soil temperature, and reducing the amount of light in the habitat. The living plants then compete for limited resources such as light, nutrients, and space. The rapid spread of this organism limits other plant diversity, and allows for it to achieve high dominance in the area. It also grows densely, which in addition to the large excess of litter the plant leaves behind, is responsible for the limited light availability for other organisms growing in the area.

== Ecological role of Typha × glauca ==
Typha × glauca can invade a variety of different habitats, from freshwater marshes to wet meadows to roadsides. This plant requires an underwater base in order to survive in that habitat, which is the factor that all these habitats have in common. By using its invasion tactics, the cattail hybrid is able to quickly spread and displace other species of plants. They are an ecological threat to native species like Typha latifolia. The threat of this hybrid species has also grown, as it has become more aggressive, adapting to new habitats like rivers, lakes, and streams. The dense growth pattern of this plant species is monotypic, affecting the biodiversity of the habitat and limiting the ability of other organisms to use the habitat. This congests the open water habitat that is needed by waterfowl and other wildlife species that inhabit the area. Additionally, the excessive evapotranspiration of this plant species can deplete water supplies and alter the microbial community structure of the soil. This can lead to a lower water quality and increases in nitrogen and phosphorus in the soil.

Although this hybrid plant species poses a threat to other competing species, it can also be a vital resource for marsh-dwelling animals. Because of the hybrid plants’ high growth rate and high litter biomass, it can be used as a great source of food and shelter for these animals. This plant species also has a number of traits that make it desirable for remediating industrial sites. This includes improving water quality for wastewater treatment by increasing denitrification and increasing sediment nitrogen and phosphorus concentrations. The plant’s high tolerance to heavy metals also makes it an appropriate choice for remediating industrial sites.

Typha × glauca also has a number of predators, including caterpillars of the moths Arzama opbliqua and Nonagria oblonga). The leaves and stems of the plant are also consumed by Aphids and Colandra pertinaux, more commonly referred to as the snout beetle. The muskrat and other mammals use the plant for food as well which has a large influence on the plant’s population density. The muskrat population has also been recorded in the past to eat such a large amount of the cattails to set its growth back by a full season. The leaves and stems can also be utilized by the muskrat and birds to build houses and nests, respectively.

== Economic value ==
The leaves and other parts of the Typha × glauca plant have been found to be of possible economic value. The leaves can be used for weaving and other parts of the plant such as the rhizomes and pollen have been eaten in the past by indigenous Americans and Europeans. The pollen is a protein-rich substance and the rhizomes are up to 80% starch. However, there are potential risks for eating this plant, including toxic oil poisoning if the water the plant grows in has been contaminated. Due to the plant’s tendencies to accumulate heavy metals and other toxins it would make these plant products particularly dangerous in areas where water contamination may have occurred. The high environmental tolerance and productivity rates of this plant species hybrid also makes it an “attractive species for biofuel production”, which is a very lucrative business as well.

== Control ==
Although it would seem ideal to eliminate the hybrid cattails from high-quality natural areas, this proves to be too difficult as cattail populations are often too large and the intermingling between species makes it difficult to differentiate. Due to this, cattail populations are managed to control their spread and density, rather than their total elimination. In general, fifty percent vegetation countered with fifty percent open water allows for a diverse habitat with a variety of wildlife. Typha × glauca can be controlled through a number of mechanical and chemical means.

Mechanical methods of controlling the hybrid include cutting or scraping. Stems should be cut in winter or early spring to allow for natural spring flooding to submerge and suffocate cattails and prevent its growth during the growing season. Cutting the stems below water has been demonstrated to effectively kill Typha × glauca. Alternatively, pulling can be used as a method of control; however its effectiveness is limited to young cattails with underdeveloped root systems. Mechanical removal of the hybrid has been proven to increase native plant diversity and reduce the dominance of Typha × glauca. Prescribed fire is another method of control that can be used. This method is also most effective when performed in the winter and early spring. Control is achieved through burning the thatch layer and effectively stressing the plants. This is particularly effective prior to a spring flood in which the increasing water levels would aid in control efforts. Grazing by cattle is another method of control that can effectively control the hybrid through a combination of grazing and trampling. Chemically, herbicides can be used, but are a last resort. Aquatically certified glyphosate or lmazapyr herbicides are those most commonly used. This method of control is typically avoided as it can have a detrimental impact on surrounding, non-target species.
