= Typha turcomanica =

Scientific classification
- Kingdom: Plantae
- Clade: Tracheophytes
- Clade: Angiosperms
- Clade: Monocots
- Clade: Commelinids
- Order: Poales
- Family: Typhaceae
- Genus: Typha
- Species: T. turcomanica

Binomial name
- Typha turcomanica Pobed.

Species of aquatic plant

Typha turcomanica is a plant species native to Turkmenistan. The species grows in freshwater marshes.
