= Typha × suwensis =

Scientific classification
- Kingdom: Plantae
- Clade: Tracheophytes
- Clade: Angiosperms
- Clade: Monocots
- Clade: Commelinids
- Order: Poales
- Family: Typhaceae
- Genus: Typha
- Species: T. × suwensis

Binomial name
- Typha × suwensis T.Shimizu

Species of aquatic plant

Typha × suwensis is a plant of hybrid origin, endemic to central Japan named after Suwa Province (諏方国 Suwa no kuni) west of Tokyo. It apparently originated as a cross between the two very widespread species T. latifolia and T. orientalis. Typha × suwensis grows in freshwater marshes.
