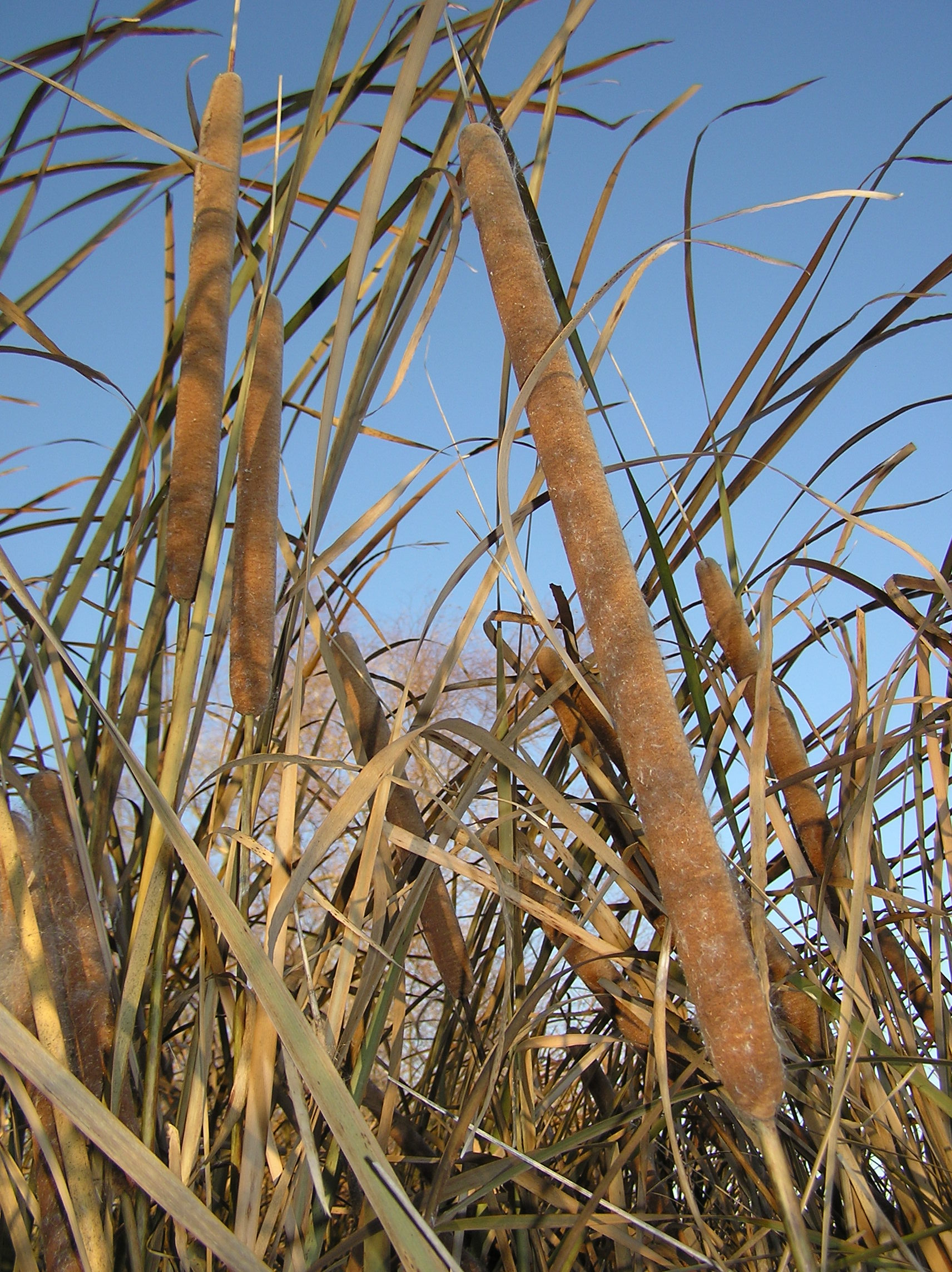

Scientific classification
- Kingdom: Plantae
- Clade: Tracheophytes
- Clade: Angiosperms
- Clade: Monocots
- Clade: Commelinids
- Order: Poales
- Family: Typhaceae
- Genus: Typha
- Species: T. austro-orientalis

Binomial name
- Typha austro-orientalis Mavrodiev

= Typha austro-orientalis =

Species of aquatic plant

Typha austro-orientalis is a plant species native to the southern part of European Russia. It grows in freshwater marshes. The type specimen was collected in 2000 near the City of Volgograd.
