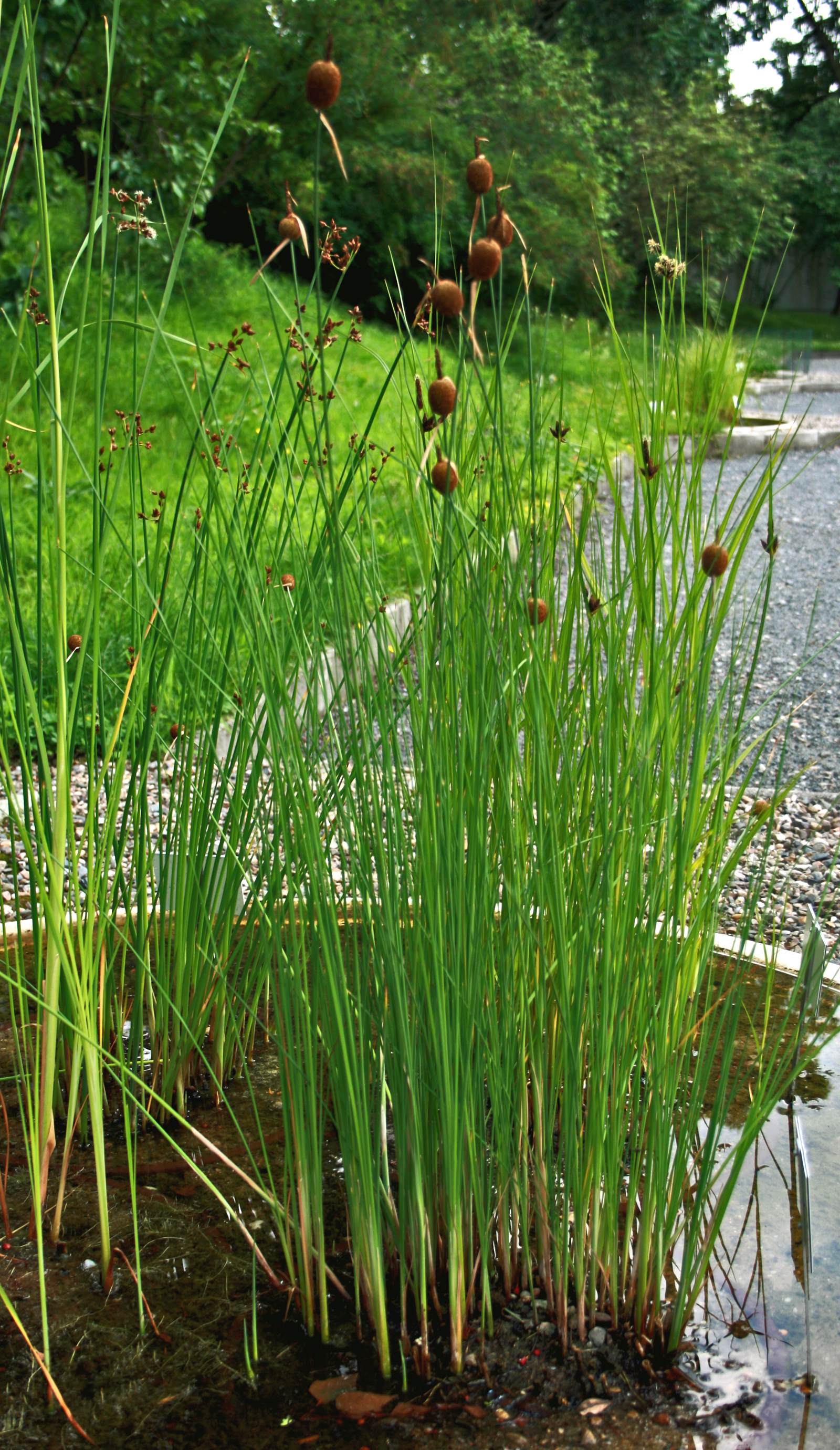

Conservation status
- Least Concern (IUCN 3.1)

Scientific classification
- Kingdom: Plantae
- Clade: Tracheophytes
- Clade: Angiosperms
- Clade: Monocots
- Clade: Commelinids
- Order: Poales
- Family: Typhaceae
- Genus: Typha
- Species: T. minima

Binomial name
- Typha minima Funck ex Hoppe

Synonyms
- Rohrbachia minima (Funck) Mavrodiev; Typha angustissima Griff.; Typha pallida Pobed.

= Typha minima =

Species of aquatic plant

Typha minima, common name dwarf bulrush or miniature cattail or least bulrush, is a perennial herbaceous plant belonging to the Typhaceae family.

== Description ==
The biological form of Typha minima is hemicryptophyte hydrophyte, meaning that they are plants with submerged overwintering buds, adapted to living in aquatic environments. Vegetative propagation takes place by means of a short 5 to 8 millimeters thick rhizome, that grow up to 20 cm deep in the ground.

Typha minima is the smallest of the cattails. It reaches on average 30–80 centimetres (12–31 in) in height, with a maximum of 140 centimetres (55 in). The stem is erect and simple. The leaves are blue-green, linear, very narrow and not shiny. They reach up to 30 centimetres (12 in) in length and 1–3 millimetres (0.039–0.118 in) in width.

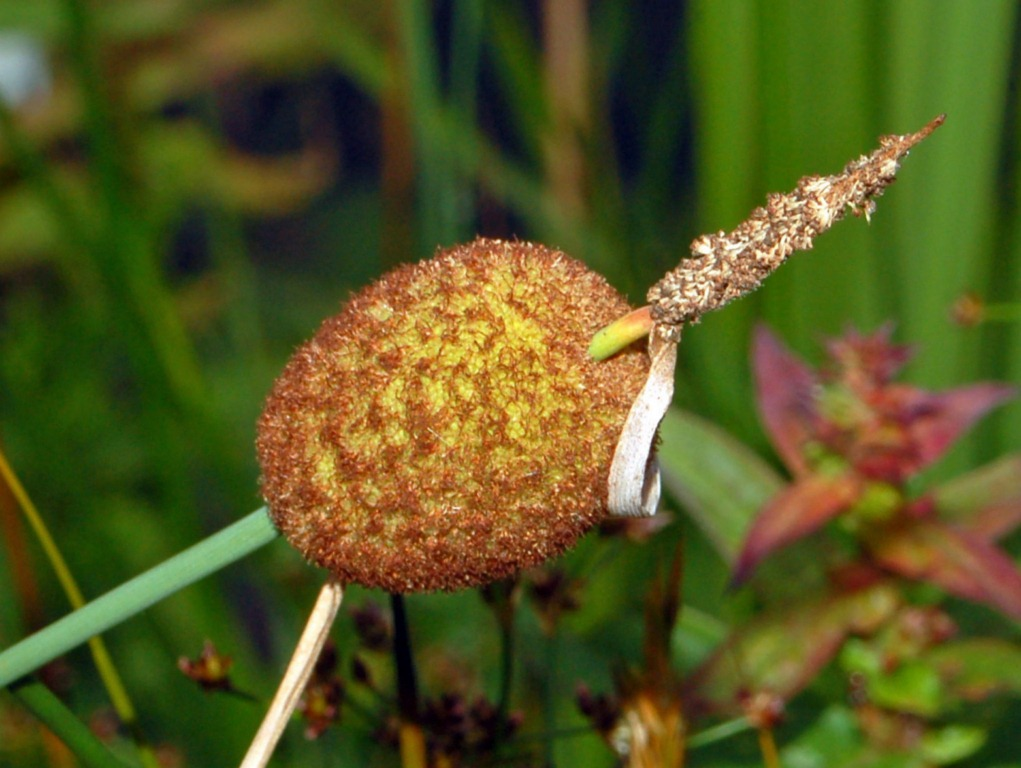
Close-up of a seed spike

These plants are monoecious, with the male and female reproductive structures borne on the same plant but packed into two separate inflorescences. The minute flowers are unisexual and wind-pollinated. Male (staminate) flowers are yellowish, while female (pistillate) flowers are greenish. The female inflorescence is brownish, ellipsoid, 2–5 centimetres (0.79–1.97 in) long, with a hairy rachis after the fall of the flowers. It is separated from the male inflorescence by a naked stem section, about 1 centimetre (0.39 in) long. The male inflorescence is thinner and longer, at the top of the vertical stem. The female flowers have one stalked ovary, surrounded by a thick fringe of hair. The three individual stamens of the male flowers are surrounded by just a few hairs. At the end of blooming the male flowers disperse, leaving the top of the stem naked, while the female inflorescence turns into a brown round seed spike. The main flowering period lasts from May through June. Another flowering period may occur in August.

== Distribution ==
This rare plant is widespread in temperate Europe and Asia. The distribution is limited to the rivers of the Alps and the Apennines and to the Balkans, the Danube region and the mountains of central Asia.

== Habitat ==
Typha minima is a light-loving plant and cannot tolerate shade. It grows on periodically flooded banks of slow flowing, cool and pure waters, along lake margins, in marshes, ponds and swamps, at an altitude of 0–1,000 metres (0–3,281 ft) above sea level.
