= Typha changbaiensis =

Scientific classification
- Kingdom: Plantae
- Clade: Tracheophytes
- Clade: Angiosperms
- Clade: Monocots
- Clade: Commelinids
- Order: Poales
- Family: Typhaceae
- Genus: Typha
- Species: T. changbaiensis

Binomial name
- Typha changbaiensis M.Jiang Wu & Y.T.Zhao

Species of aquatic plant

Typha changbaiensis is a plant species native to the Changbai Mountains in the Jilin province of northeastern China. It grows in freshwater marshes.
