= Typha incana =

Scientific classification
- Kingdom: Plantae
- Clade: Tracheophytes
- Clade: Angiosperms
- Clade: Monocots
- Clade: Commelinids
- Order: Poales
- Family: Typhaceae
- Genus: Typha
- Species: T. incana

Binomial name
- Typha incana Kapit. & Dyukina

Species of aquatic plant

Typha incana is a plant species native to the eastern part of European Russia and to Western Siberia (За́падно-Сиби́рский экономи́ческий райо́н). The species grows in freshwater marshes and along banks of rivers and lakes.
