= Typha × smirnovii =

Scientific classification
- Kingdom: Plantae
- Clade: Tracheophytes
- Clade: Angiosperms
- Clade: Monocots
- Clade: Commelinids
- Order: Poales
- Family: Typhaceae
- Genus: Typha
- Species: T. × smirnovii

Binomial name
- Typha × smirnovii Mavrodiev

Species of aquatic plant

Typha × smirnovii is a plant of hybrid origin, endemic to southern Russia. Initial collections were made in 1998 in the vicinity of Volgograd. The plant apparently originated as a cross between the two very widespread species T. latifolia and T. laxmannii. Typha × smirnovii grows in freshwater marshes.
