= Typha alekseevii =

Scientific classification
- Kingdom: Plantae
- Clade: Tracheophytes
- Clade: Angiosperms
- Clade: Monocots
- Clade: Commelinids
- Order: Poales
- Family: Typhaceae
- Genus: Typha
- Species: T. alekseevii

Binomial name
- Typha alekseevii Mavrodiev

Species of aquatic plant

Typha alekseevii is a plant species native to the Caucasus Region (Armenia, Azerbaijan, Georgia and southern European Russia). It grows in freshwater marshes.
