= Salvia karabachensis =

Scientific classification
- Kingdom: Plantae
- Clade: Tracheophytes
- Clade: Angiosperms
- Clade: Eudicots
- Clade: Asterids
- Order: Lamiales
- Family: Lamiaceae
- Genus: Salvia
- Species: S. karabachensis

Binomial name
- Salvia karabachensis Pobed.

Species of flowering plant

Salvia karabachensis is a species of sage, endemic to the Caucasus region. Like several other sage species, it is considered a medicinal plant. The species' specific epithet, karabachensis is derived from the Karabakh region.
