= Typha albida =

Scientific classification
- Kingdom: Plantae
- Clade: Tracheophytes
- Clade: Angiosperms
- Clade: Monocots
- Clade: Commelinids
- Order: Poales
- Family: Typhaceae
- Genus: Typha
- Species: T. albida

Binomial name
- Typha albida Riedl

Species of aquatic plant

Typha albida is a plant species endemic to Afghanistan. It grows in freshwater marshes.
