= Typha azerbaijanensis =

Scientific classification
- Kingdom: Plantae
- Clade: Tracheophytes
- Clade: Angiosperms
- Clade: Monocots
- Clade: Commelinids
- Order: Poales
- Family: Typhaceae
- Genus: Typha
- Species: T. azerbaijanensis

Binomial name
- Typha azerbaijanensis Hamdi & Assadi

Species of aquatic plant

Typha azerbaijanensis is a plant species endemic to northeastern Iran. The name refers not to the independent Republic of Azerbaijan but rather to the Azerbaijan region in northeastern Iran. The species grows in freshwater marshes. Type collection was made between Khoy and Marand at an elevation of about 1100 m.
