= Typha tichomirovii =

Scientific classification
- Kingdom: Plantae
- Clade: Tracheophytes
- Clade: Angiosperms
- Clade: Monocots
- Clade: Commelinids
- Order: Poales
- Family: Typhaceae
- Genus: Typha
- Species: T. tichomirovii

Binomial name
- Typha tichomirovii Mavrodiev

Species of aquatic plant

Typha tichomirovii is a plant species native to the Astrakhan Oblast in the southern part of European Russia. The species grows in freshwater marshes and along the banks of streams and lakes. The delta of the Volga River lies within Astrakhan.
