= Typha subulata =

Scientific classification
- Kingdom: Plantae
- Clade: Tracheophytes
- Clade: Angiosperms
- Clade: Monocots
- Clade: Commelinids
- Order: Poales
- Family: Typhaceae
- Genus: Typha
- Species: T. subulata

Binomial name
- Typha subulata Crespo & Pérez-Mor.

Species of aquatic plant

Typha subulata is a plant species native to Argentina and Uruguay. The species grows in freshwater marshes. Type collection was made in 1966 in the Río Negro Province, Departamento de General Roca.
