= Typha kalatensis =

Scientific classification
- Kingdom: Plantae
- Clade: Tracheophytes
- Clade: Angiosperms
- Clade: Monocots
- Clade: Commelinids
- Order: Poales
- Family: Typhaceae
- Genus: Typha
- Species: T. kalatensis

Binomial name
- Typha kalatensis Assadi & Hamdi

Species of aquatic plant

Typha kalatensis is a plant species endemic to Iran. The species grows in freshwater marshes. Type collection was made near the City of Kalat in Khorassan Province.
