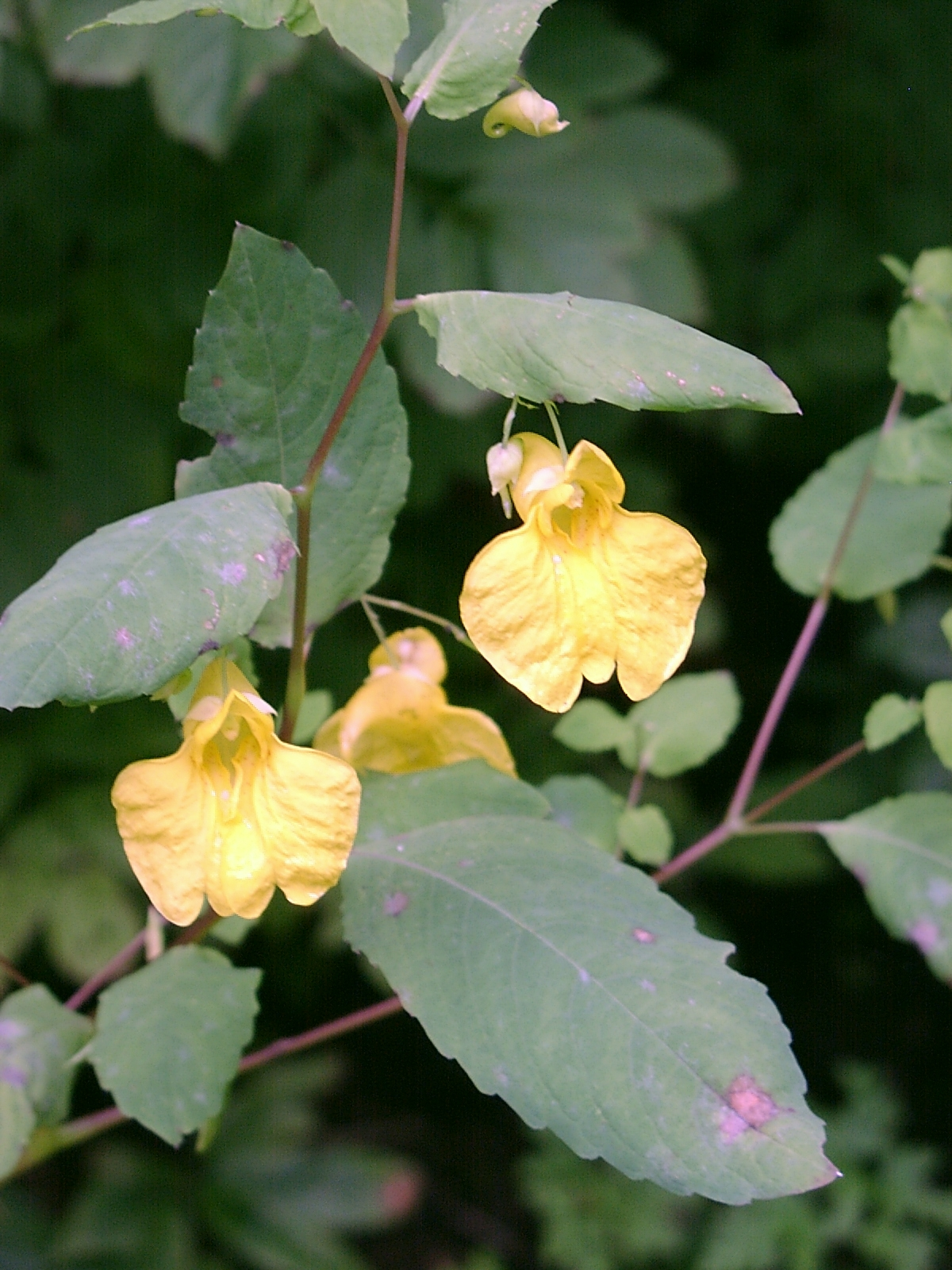

Conservation status
- Least Concern (IUCN 3.1)

Scientific classification
- Kingdom: Plantae
- Clade: Tracheophytes
- Clade: Angiosperms
- Clade: Eudicots
- Clade: Asterids
- Order: Ericales
- Family: Balsaminaceae
- Genus: Impatiens
- Species: I. noli-tangere

Binomial name
- Impatiens noli-tangere L.

Synonyms
- Balsamina lutea Delarbre; Balsamina noli-tangere (L.) Scop.; Impatiens komarovii Pobed.; Impatiens lutea Lam. nom. illeg.

= Impatiens noli-tangere =

Touch-me-not Balsam

Species of flowering plant

Impatiens noli-tangere (touch-me-not balsam; Latin impatiēns 'impatient' or 'not allowing', and nōlī tangere 'do not touch': literally 'be unwilling to touch') is an annual herbaceous plant in the family Balsaminaceae found in damp places in Europe, Asia and North America. The yellow flowers are followed by pods which forcefully explode when ripe, ejecting the seeds for some distance.

It is also called touch-me-not, yellow balsam, jewelweed, western touch-me-not, or wild balsam.

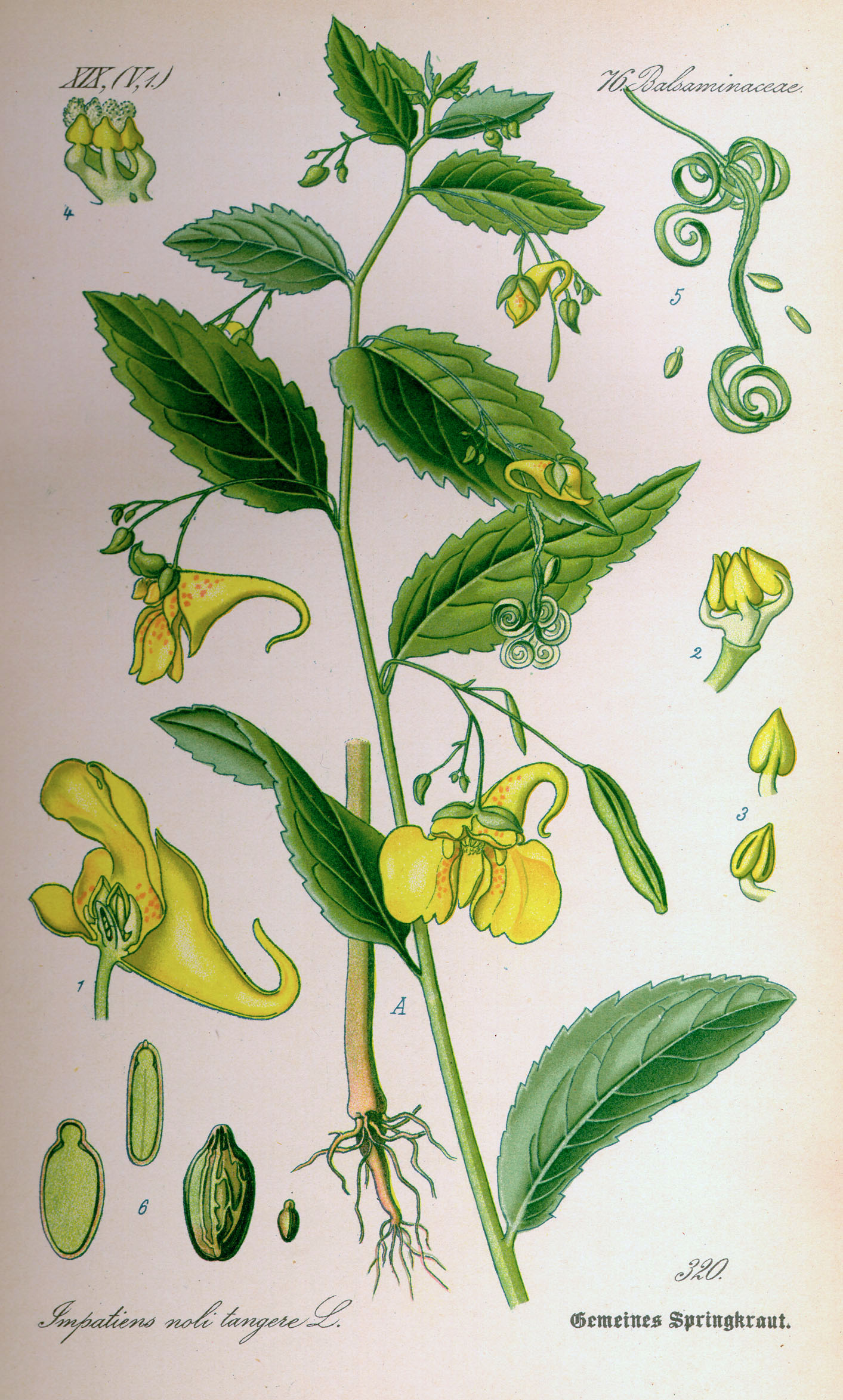
Botanical illustration by Otto Wilhelm Thomé, 1885

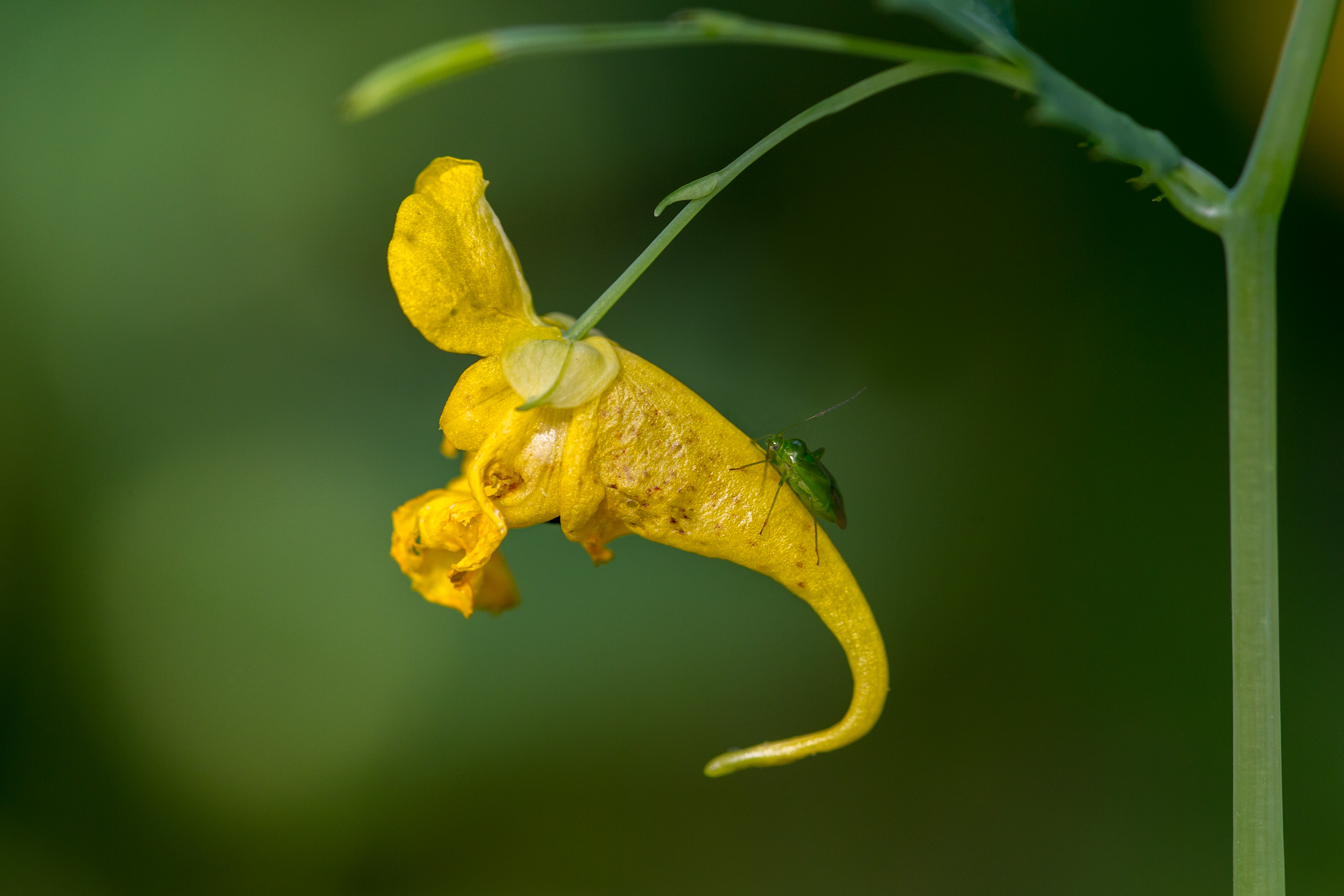
Flower closeup
