= Typha przewalskii =

Scientific classification
- Kingdom: Plantae
- Clade: Tracheophytes
- Clade: Angiosperms
- Clade: Monocots
- Clade: Commelinids
- Order: Poales
- Family: Typhaceae
- Genus: Typha
- Species: T. przewalskii

Binomial name
- Typha przewalskii B.V.Skvortsov in A.I.Baranov & B.V.Skvortsov

Species of aquatic plant

Typha przewalskii is a plant species native to the Manchuria Region of northeastern China (Provinces of Heilongjiang, Jilin, Liaoning) and also to the Primorye region in the Russian Far East. The plant grows in freshwater marshes and along the banks of lakes and streams.
