= Typha sistanica =

Scientific classification
- Kingdom: Plantae
- Clade: Tracheophytes
- Clade: Angiosperms
- Clade: Monocots
- Clade: Commelinids
- Order: Poales
- Family: Typhaceae
- Genus: Typha
- Species: T. sistanica

Binomial name
- Typha sistanica De Marco & Dinelli

Species of aquatic plant

Typha sistanica is a plant species native to Iran. The species grows in freshwater marshes.
