= Novosti Sistematiki Vysshikh Rastenii =

Novosti Sistematiki Vysshikh Rastenii (abrev. Novosti Sist. Vyssh. Rast.)
- Categories: Botany
- Frequency: Biannual
- Founded: 1964; 62 years ago
- Country: USSR
- Based in: Saint Petersburg
- Language: Russian
- ISSN: 0568-5443

Novosti Sistematiki Vysshikh Rastenii, (Russian: Новости систематики высших растений; abrev. Novosti Sist. Vyssh. Rast.; Novitates Systematicae Plantarum non Vascularium in English), is a magazine with botanic illustrations and descriptions, edited in the USSR since 1964. The founders were the botanists of the Komarov Botanical Institute. Its headquarters is in Saint Petersburg. The frequency of the magazine is biannual.
