= Typha davidiana =

Scientific classification
- Kingdom: Plantae
- Clade: Tracheophytes
- Clade: Angiosperms
- Clade: Monocots
- Clade: Commelinids
- Order: Poales
- Family: Typhaceae
- Genus: Typha
- Species: T. davidiana

Binomial name
- Typha davidiana ( Kronf. ) Hand.-Mazz.

Synonyms
- Typha laxmannii var. davidiana (Kronf.) C.F.Fang; Typha martini var. davidiana Kronf.

Species of aquatic plant

Typha davidiana is a plant species native to China (Hebei, Henan, Jiangsu, Liaoning, Nei Mongol, Xinjiang, Zhejiang). It grows in freshwater marshes and on the banks of lakes and streams.
