= Typha tzvelevii =

Scientific classification
- Kingdom: Plantae
- Clade: Tracheophytes
- Clade: Angiosperms
- Clade: Monocots
- Clade: Commelinids
- Order: Poales
- Family: Typhaceae
- Genus: Typha
- Species: T. tzvelevii

Binomial name
- Typha tzvelevii Mavrodiev

Species of aquatic plant

Typha tzvelevii is a plant species endemic to the Primorye region of the Russian Far East. It grows in wet places.
