= Westwick Lakes =

Wetland in Norfolk, United Kingdom

Coordinates: 52.794°N 1.371°E

- Site of Special Scientific Interest
- Location of Westwick Lakes.
- Area of search: Norfolk
- Grid reference: TG 274 272
- Interest: Biological
- Area: 9.8 hectares (24 acres)
- Notification date: 1985
- Location map: Magic Map

Westwick Lakes is a 9.8-hectare (24-acre) biological Site of Special Scientific Interest south of North Walsham in Norfolk, England.

Many wildfowl winter in the five man-made lakes, which have distinctive aquatic flora. Plants on the lake margins include lesser reedmace, soft rush, and sweet flag.

The site is private, with no public access.
