= Typha valentinii =

Scientific classification
- Kingdom: Plantae
- Clade: Tracheophytes
- Clade: Angiosperms
- Clade: Monocots
- Clade: Commelinids
- Order: Poales
- Family: Typhaceae
- Genus: Typha
- Species: T. valentinii

Binomial name
- Typha valentinii Mavrodiev

Species of aquatic plant

Typha valentinii is a plant species native to Republic of Azerbaijan. The species grows in freshwater marshes.
