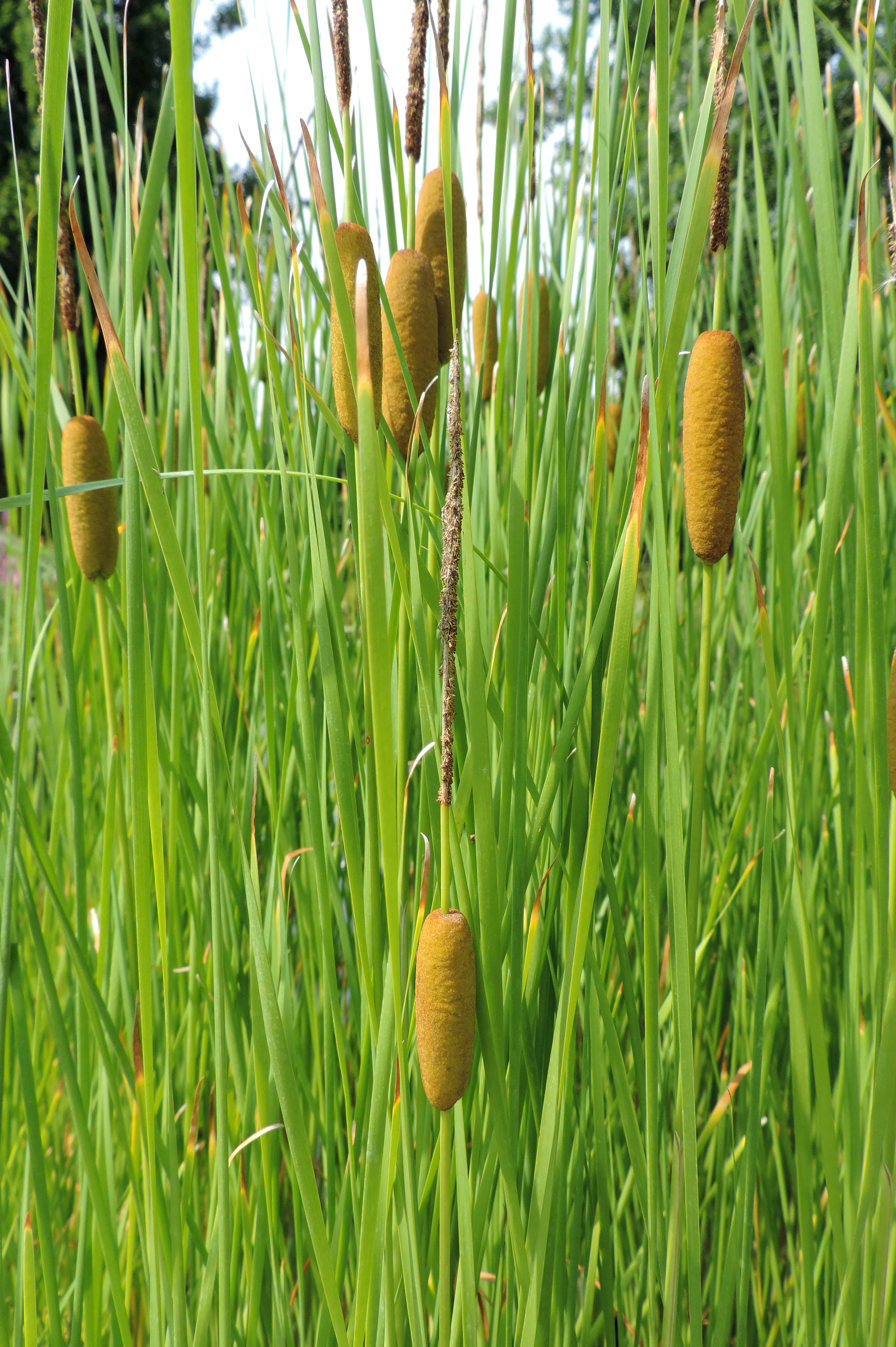
- Typha lugdunensis

Scientific classification
- Kingdom: Plantae
- Clade: Tracheophytes
- Clade: Angiosperms
- Clade: Monocots
- Clade: Commelinids
- Order: Poales
- Family: Typhaceae
- Genus: Typha
- Species: T. lugdunensis

Binomial name
- Typha lugdunensis P.Chabert

Synonyms
- Rohrbachia martini (Jord.) Mavrodiev; Typha haussknechtii Rohrb.; Typha martini Jord.; Typha minima var. gracilis Ducommun; Typha minima subsp. gracilis (Ducommun) K.Richt.; Typha stenophylla Hausskn. ex Rohrb.

= Typha lugdunensis =

Species of plant

Typha lugdunensis is a plant species found in an odd disjunct distribution in Europe and Asia. It has been reported from Germany, Switzerland, France, Iran, Iraq, Turkey, and China (Hebei, Nei Mongol, Shandong, Xinjiang). The species grows in freshwater marshes.
