= Rosa adenophylla =

Scientific classification
- Kingdom: Plantae
- Clade: Tracheophytes
- Clade: Angiosperms
- Clade: Eudicots
- Clade: Rosids
- Order: Rosales
- Family: Rosaceae
- Genus: Rosa
- Species: R. adenophylla

Binomial name
- Rosa adenophylla Galushko

Species of flowering plant

Rosa adenophylla is a species of flowering plant in the family Rosaceae. It is native to the Caucasus region, where it grows primarily in temperate biomes. The species is a shrubby rose.

The species was first described by the Russian botanist Vladimir Komarov. Its description was published in the botanical journal Botanicheskie Materialy Gerbariya Botanicheskogo Instituta Imeni V.L. Komarova Akademii Nauk SSSR, a scientific publication of the Komarov Botanical Institute.
