= Typha elephantina =

Conservation status
- Least Concern (IUCN 3.1)

Scientific classification
- Kingdom: Plantae
- Clade: Tracheophytes
- Clade: Angiosperms
- Clade: Monocots
- Clade: Commelinids
- Order: Poales
- Family: Typhaceae
- Genus: Typha
- Species: T. elephantina

Binomial name
- Typha elephantina Roxb.

Synonyms
- Typha elephantina var. schimperi (Rohrb.) Graebn.; Typha latifolia subsp. maresii (Batt.) Batt.; Typha maresii Batt.; Typha schimperi Rohrb.

Species of plant

Typha elephantina is a plant species widespread across northern Africa and southern Asia. It is considered native in Algeria, Egypt, Libya, Mauritania, Senegal, Chad, Eritrea, Ethiopia, Turkmenistan, Tajikistan, Uzbekistan, the Palestine region, Saudi Arabia, Yemen, Yunnan, Assam, Bangladesh, India, Bhutan, Nepal, Pakistan and Burma. It grows in freshwater marshes and on the banks of lakes and streams.
