= Typha joannis =

Scientific classification
- Kingdom: Plantae
- Clade: Tracheophytes
- Clade: Angiosperms
- Clade: Monocots
- Clade: Commelinids
- Order: Poales
- Family: Typhaceae
- Genus: Typha
- Species: T. joannis

Binomial name
- Typha joannis Mavrodiev

Species of aquatic plant

Typha joannis is a plant species native to Mongolia and Amur. The species grows in freshwater marshes and on the banks of lakes and rivers.
