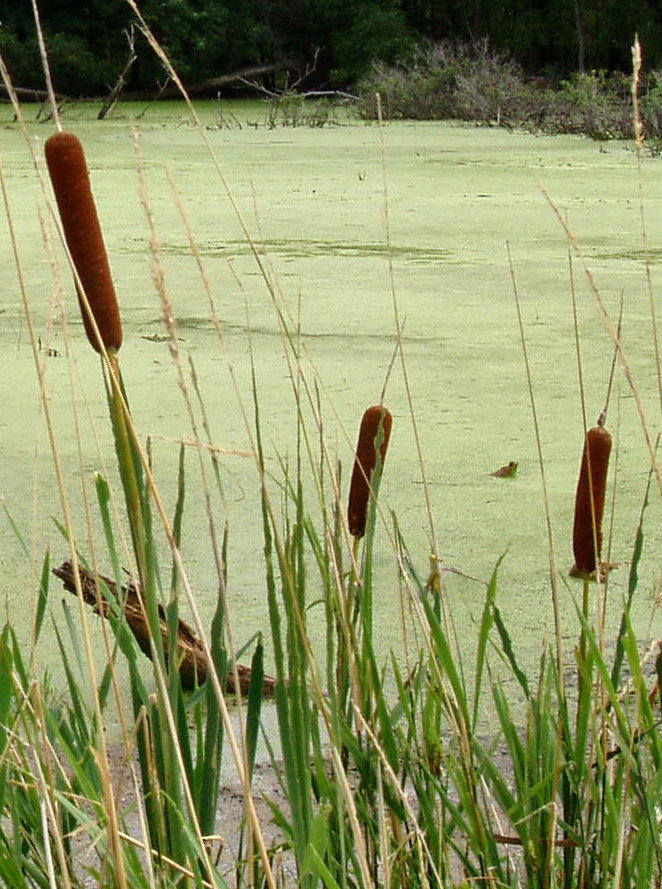
- Typha in Indiana, United States

Scientific classification
- Kingdom: Plantae
- Clade: Tracheophytes
- Clade: Angiosperms
- Clade: Monocots
- Clade: Commelinids
- Order: Poales
- Family: Typhaceae
- Genus: Typha; L.

Synonyms
- Massula Dulac; Rohrbachia (Kronf. ex Riedl) Mavrodiev

= Typha =

Genus of flowering plants

Typha /ˈtaɪfə/ is a genus of about 30 species of monocotyledonous flowering plants in the family Typhaceae. These plants have a variety of common names, in British English bulrush or (mainly historically) reedmace, in American English cattail or punks, in Australia cumbungi or bulrush, in Canada bulrush or cattail, and in New Zealand raupō, bullrush, cattail, or reed.

The genus is largely distributed in the Northern Hemisphere, where it is found in a variety of wetland habitats. Although they can accumulate toxins in polluted areas, many parts of the plant are edible, including the starchy rhizomes.

== Description ==
Typha are aquatic or semiaquatic, rhizomatous, herbaceous, perennial plants growing to 0.8–2.4 m (2 1/2–8 ft) in height. The leaves are long and narrow, up to 2.5 cm (1 in) wide, glabrous (hairless), linear, alternate, and mostly basal on a simple, jointless stem that bears the flowering spikes.

The plants are monoecious, with unisexual flowers that develop in dense racemes. The numerous male flowers form a narrow spike at the top of the vertical stem. Each male (staminate) flower is reduced to a pair of stamens and hairs, and it withers once the pollen is shed. Large numbers of tiny female flowers form a dense, sausage-shaped spike on the stem below the male spike. This can be up to 30 cm (12 in) long and 1 to 4 cm (1/2 to 1 1/2 in) thick. The seeds are minute, 0.2 mm (0.008 in) long, and attached to fine hairs. When ripe, the heads disintegrate into a cottony fluff from which the seeds disperse by wind.

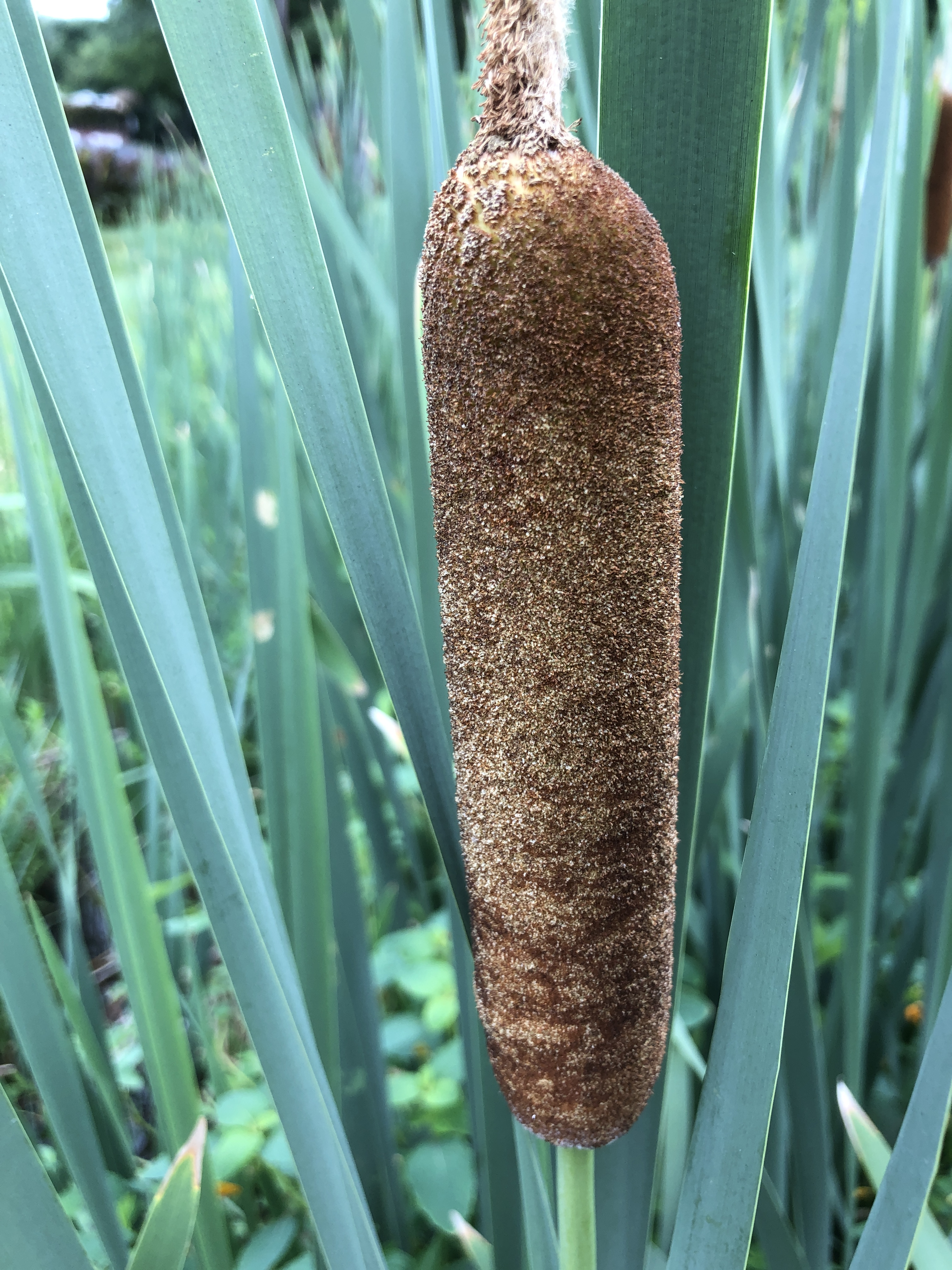
Close-up of the female flower spike

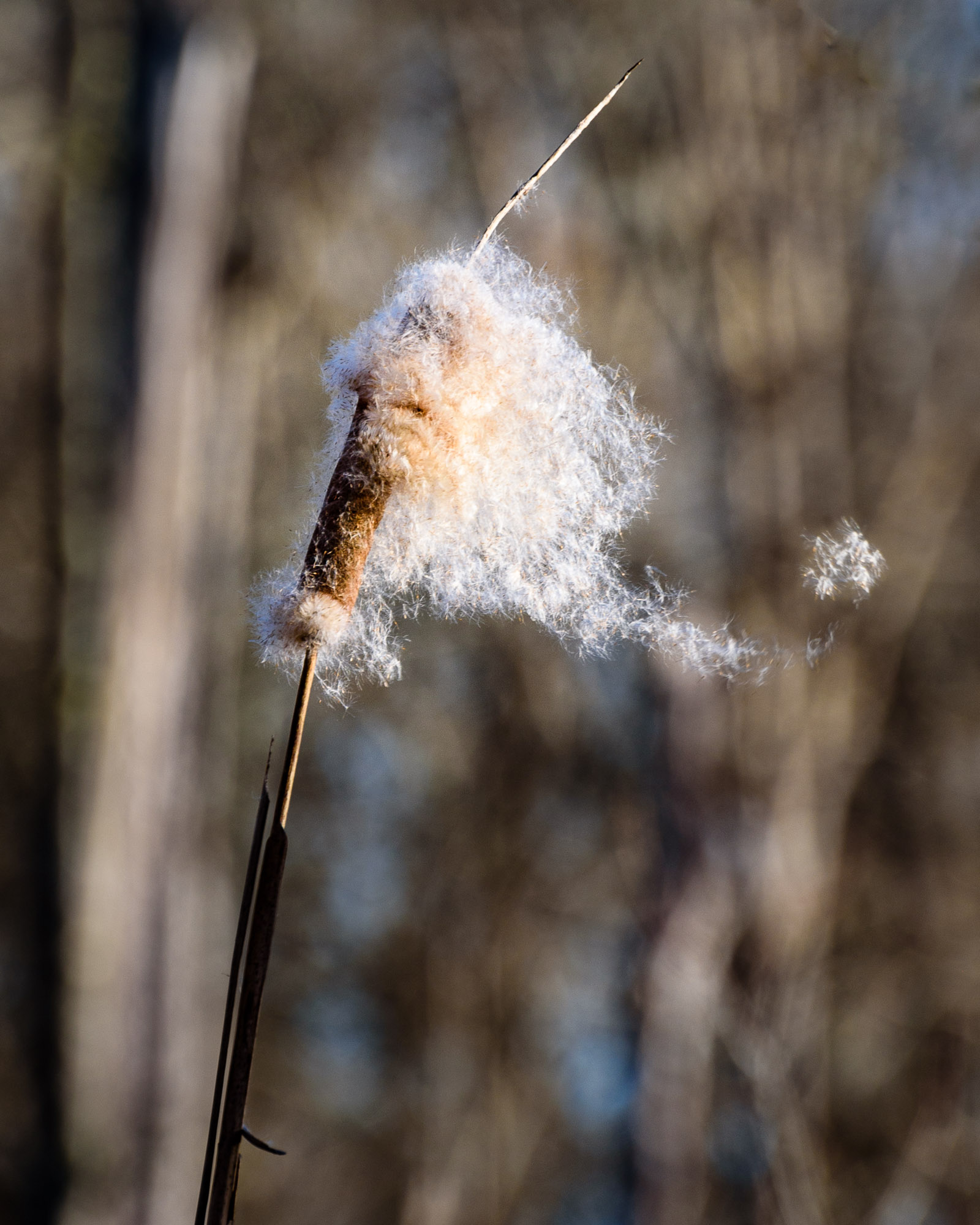
The seeds being dispersed by wind

== Taxonomy ==
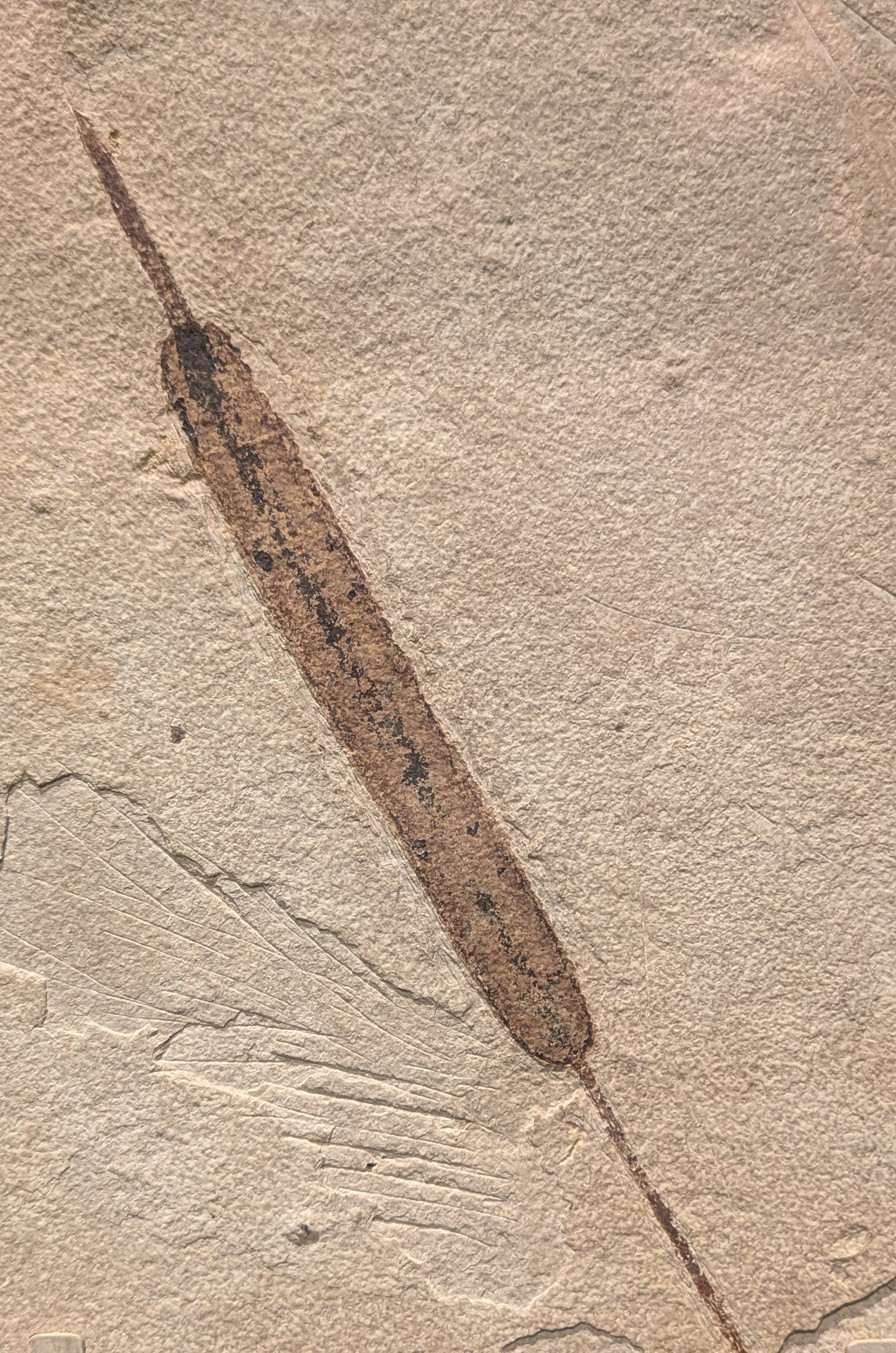
Fossil in the Field Museum

Fruit of Typha have been found as long ago as 69 million years ago in modern Central Europe.

=== Taxa ===
These species and hybrids are currently accepted:

- Typha albida – (Afghanistan)
- Typha alekseevii – (Caucasus)
- Typha angustifolia – lesser bulrush, narrow leaf cattail (America), or jambu (India)
- Typha × argoviensis – (Germany and Switzerland)
- Typha austro-orientalis – (European Russia)
- Typha azerbaijanensis – (Iran)
- Typha × bavarica – (Germany)
- Typha capensis – (tropical and southern Africa)
- Typha changbaiensis – (northeastern China)
- Typha davidiana – (China)
- Typha domingensis – bulrush, southern cattail (America), narrow-leaved cumbungi (Australia)
- Typha elephantina – (from Algeria to southern China)
- Typha × gezei – (France)
- Typha × glauca (T. angustifolia × T. latifolia) – hybrid cattail, white cattail (a sterile hybrid)
- Typha grossheimii – (Central Asia)
- Typha incana – (central Russia)
- Typha joannis – (Mongolia, Amur Oblast)
- Typha kalatensis – (Iran)
- Typha latifolia – bulrush, common cattail – (very widespread)
- Typha laxmannii – Laxman's bulrush – (southern Europe and much of Asia)
- Typha lugdunensis – (western Europe, southwest Asia, China)
- Typha minima – dwarf bulrush – (Europe, Asia)
- Typha orientalis – (East Asia), raupō (New Zealand), broad-leaved cumbungi (Australia)
- Typha pallida – (Central Asia, China)
- Typha × provincialis – (France)
- Typha przewalskii – (China, Russian Far East)
- Typha shuttleworthii – (Europe, Iran, Turkey)
- Typha sistanica – (Iran)
- Typha × smirnovii – (European Russia)
- Typha subulata – (Argentina, Uruguay)
- Typha × suwensis – (Japan)
- Typha tichomirovii – (European Russia)
- Typha turcomanica – (Turkmenistan)
- Typha tzvelevii – (Primorye)
- Typha valentinii – (Azerbaijan)
- Typha varsobica – (Tajikistan)

=== Etymology ===
Typha is an ancient Greek name for the plant. It may be related to typhos (marsh).

== Distribution and habitat ==
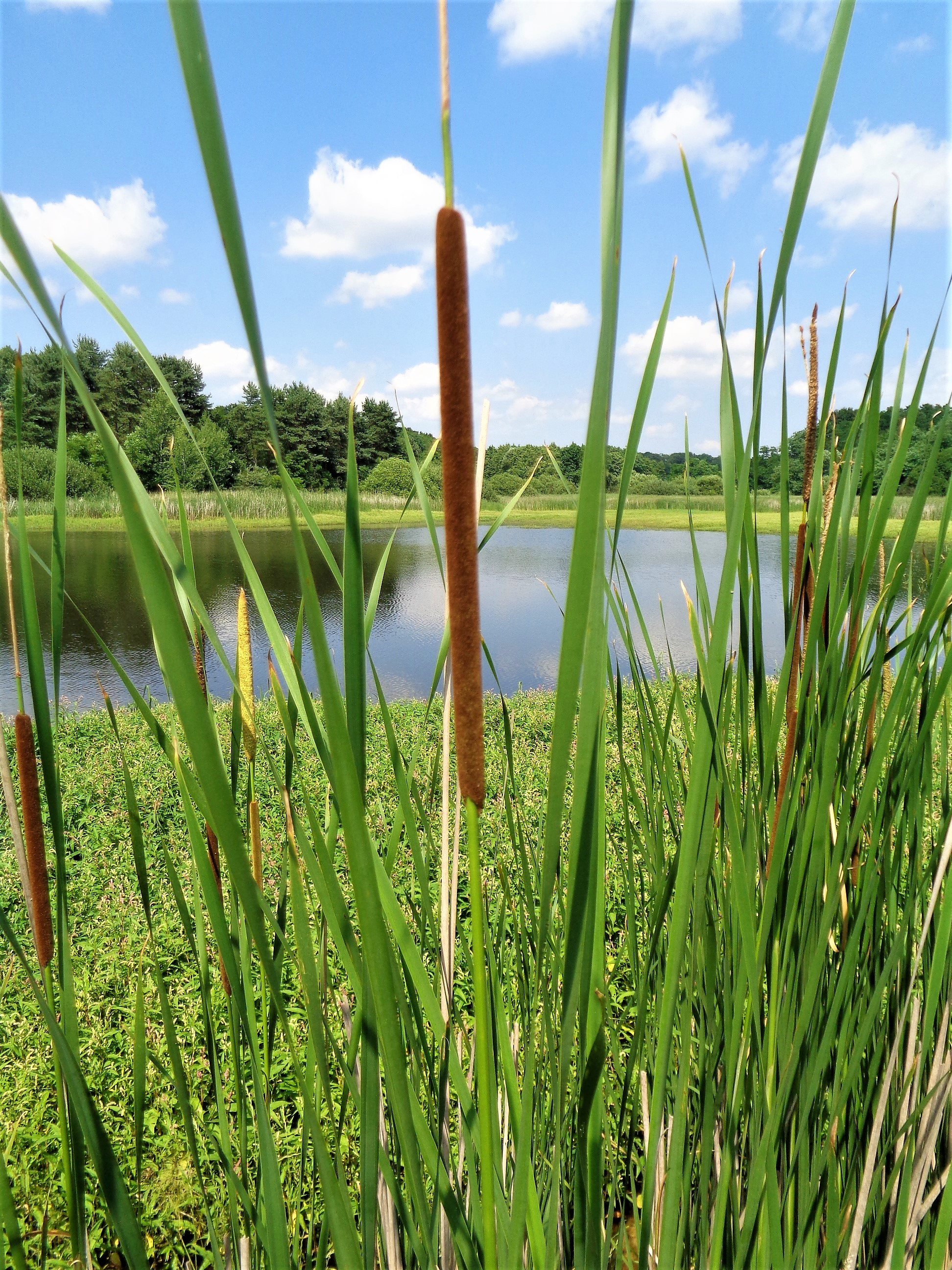
Typha angustifolia at the edge of a reservoir in Croatia

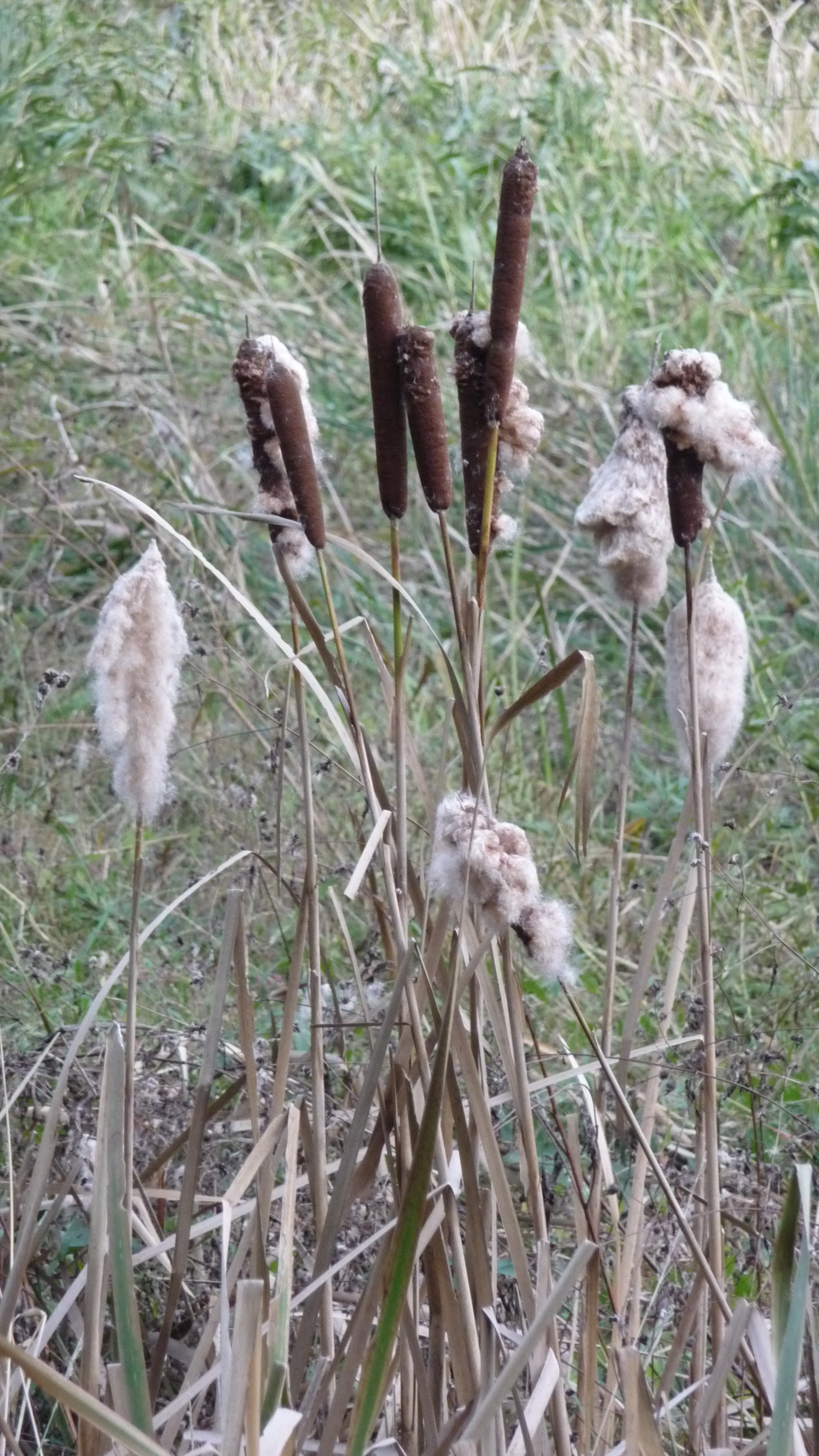
Typha latifolia in Japan

The most widespread species is Typha latifolia, which is distributed across the entire temperate Northern Hemisphere. It has also been introduced to Australia. T. angustifolia is nearly as widespread, but does not extend as far north; it may be introduced and invasive in North America. T. domingensis has a more southern American distribution and also occurs in Australia. T. orientalis is widespread in Asia, Australia, and New Zealand. T. laxmannii, T. minima, and T. shuttleworthii are largely restricted to Asia and southern Europe.

The plants grow in open swampy areas from sea level to 760 m (2,500 ft).

== Ecology ==
Typha species are often among the first wetland plants to colonize areas of newly exposed wet mud, with their abundant, wind-dispersed seeds. Buried seeds can survive in the soil for a long time. They germinate best with sunlight and fluctuating temperatures, which is typical of many wetland plants that regenerate on mud flats. The plants also spread by rhizomes, forming large, interconnected stands.

Typha species are considered to be dominant competitors in wetlands in many areas, and they often exclude other plants with their dense canopy. In the bays of the Great Lakes, for example, they are among the most abundant wetland plants. Different species of cattails are adapted to different water depths.

Well-developed aerenchymae make the plants tolerant of submersion. Even the dead stalks are capable of transmitting oxygen to the rooting zone.

Although Typha species are native wetland plants, they can be aggressive in their competition with other native species. They have been problematic in many regions in North America, from the Great Lakes to the Everglades. Native sedges are displaced and wet meadows shrink, likely as a response to altered hydrology of the wetlands and increased nutrient levels. An introduced or hybrid species may be contributing to the problem. Control is difficult. The most successful strategy appears to be mowing or burning to remove the aerenchymous stalks, followed by prolonged flooding. Invasion, importantly, can be reduced or prevented by preserving water-level fluctuations, including periods of drought, and maintaining infertile conditions.

Typha species are frequently eaten by wetland mammals, such as muskrats, which also use them to construct feeding platforms and dens, thereby also providing nesting and resting places for waterfowl.

== Potential toxicity ==
Some species are known to accumulate toxins and so must first undergo treatment before being eaten. Plants growing in polluted water can accumulate lead and pesticide residues in their rhizomes and should not be eaten.

== Uses ==
Cattail, narrow leaf shoots
Nutritional value per 100 g (3.5 oz)
- Energy: 106 kJ (25 kcal)
- Carbohydrates: 5.14 g
- Sugars: 0.22 g
- Dietary fiber: 4.5 g
- Fat: 0.00 g
- Protein: 1.18 g
Vitamins and minerals
Vitamins	Quantity %DV^{†}
Vitamin A equiv. beta-Carotene	0% 1 μg 0% 6 μg
Thiamine (B1)	2% 0.023 mg
Riboflavin (B2)	2% 0.025 mg
Niacin (B3)	3% 0.440 mg
Pantothenic acid (B5)	5% 0.234 mg
Vitamin B6	7% 0.123 mg
Folate (B9)	1% 3 μg
Choline	4% 23.7 mg
Vitamin C	1% 0.7 mg
Vitamin K	19% 22.8 μg
Minerals	Quantity %DV^{†}
Calcium	4% 54 mg
Copper	5% 0.041 mg
Iron	5% 0.91 mg
Magnesium	15% 63 mg
Manganese	33% 0.760 mg
Phosphorus	4% 45 mg
Potassium	10% 309 mg
Selenium	1% 0.6 μg
Sodium	5% 109 mg
Zinc	2% 0.24 mg
- Other constituents: Quantity
- Water: 92.65 g
- ^{†}Percentages estimated using US recommendations for adults, except for potassium, which is estimated based on expert recommendation from the National Academies.

=== Culinary ===
Many parts of Typha plants are edible to humans, with various parts being usable throughout the year. The starchy rhizomes are nutritious, with a protein content comparable to that of maize or rice. They can be processed into a flour with 266 kcal per 100 grams. They are fibrous and the starch must be scraped or sucked from the tough fibers. Evidence of preserved starch grains on grinding stones suggests the rhizomes were being eaten in Europe 30,000 years ago. Also underground is a carbohydrate lump, which can be peeled and eaten raw or cooked like a potato.

Baby shoots emerging from the rhizomes, which are sometimes subterranean, can be picked and eaten raw. Before the plants flower, the tender inside of the shoots can be squeezed out and eaten raw or cooked. The rind of young stems can be peeled off and the tender white heart inside can be eaten raw or boiled and eaten like asparagus. This food has been popular among the Cossacks in Ukraine and has been called "Cossack asparagus". The inner stalk of the leaf bases can be eaten raw or cooked, especially in late spring when they are young and tender. In early summer, both the male and female green flower spikes can be boiled (after removing the sheath of the female spike) and eaten like corn on the cob. In mid-summer when the male flowers are mature, the pollen can be collected and used as a flour supplement or thickener; the Māori of New Zealand have a special bread called pungapunga made from the pollen of T. orientalis.

=== Agriculture ===
The seeds have a high linoleic acid content and can be used to feed cattle and chickens. They can also be found cultivated in African countries such as Ghana.

Harvesting cattail removes nutrients from the wetland that would otherwise return via the decomposition of decaying plant matter. Floating mats of cattails remove nutrients from eutrophied bodies of freshwater.

=== Building material ===
For local native tribes around Lake Titicaca in Peru and Bolivia, Typha species were among the most important plants, and every part of the plant had multiple uses. For example, they were used to construct rafts and other boats.

During World War II, the United States Navy used the down of Typha as a substitute for kapok in life vests and aviation jackets. Even after 100 hours of submersion, their buoyancy was still effective.

Typha fluff can be used as thermal insulation in buildings as an organic alternative to conventional insulating materials such as glass wool or stone wool.

=== Paper ===
Typha stems and leaves can be used to make paper. It is strong with a heavy texture but hard to bleach, so it is not suitable for industrial production of graphical paper. In 1853, considerable amounts of cattail paper were produced in New York due to a shortage of raw materials. In 1948, French scientists tested methods for annual harvesting of the leaves. Because of the high cost, these methods were abandoned and no further research was done. Today, Typha fiber is used to make decorative paper.

=== Fiber ===
Fibers up to 4 m (13 ft) long can be obtained from the stems when they are treated mechanically or chemically with sodium hydroxide. The stem fibers resemble jute and can be used to produce raw textiles. The leaf fibers can be used as an alternative to cotton and linen in clothing. The yield of leaf fiber is 30 to 40% and T. glauca can produce 7 to 10 tons per hectare annually.

=== Biofuel ===
Typha can be used as a source of starch to produce ethanol. Because of their high productivity in northern latitudes, Typha species are considered to be a bioenergy crop.

=== Other ===
The seed hairs were used by some indigenous peoples of the Americas as tinder for starting fires. Some tribes also used Typha down to line moccasins and for bedding, diapers, baby powder, and cradleboards. One Native American word for Typha meant "fruit for papoose's bed". Typha down is still used in some areas to stuff clothing items and pillows. It can be dipped in wax or fat and then lit as a candle, the stem serving as a wick. Without the use of wax or fat, it will smolder slowly, somewhat like incense.

The flower stalks can be made into chopsticks. The leaves can be treated to weave into baskets, mats, or sandals. The rushes are harvested and the leaves often dried for later use in chair seats. Rewetted, the leaves are twisted and wrapped around the chair rungs to form a densely woven seat that is then stuffed (usually with the leftover rush).

Small-scale experiments have indicated that Typha species are able to remove arsenic from drinking water. The boiled rootstocks have been used as a diuretic for increasing urination, or mashed to make a jelly-like paste for sores, boils, wounds, burns, scabs, and smallpox pustules.

Cattail pollen is used as a banker source of food for predatory insects and mites (such as Amblyseius swirskii) in greenhouses.
