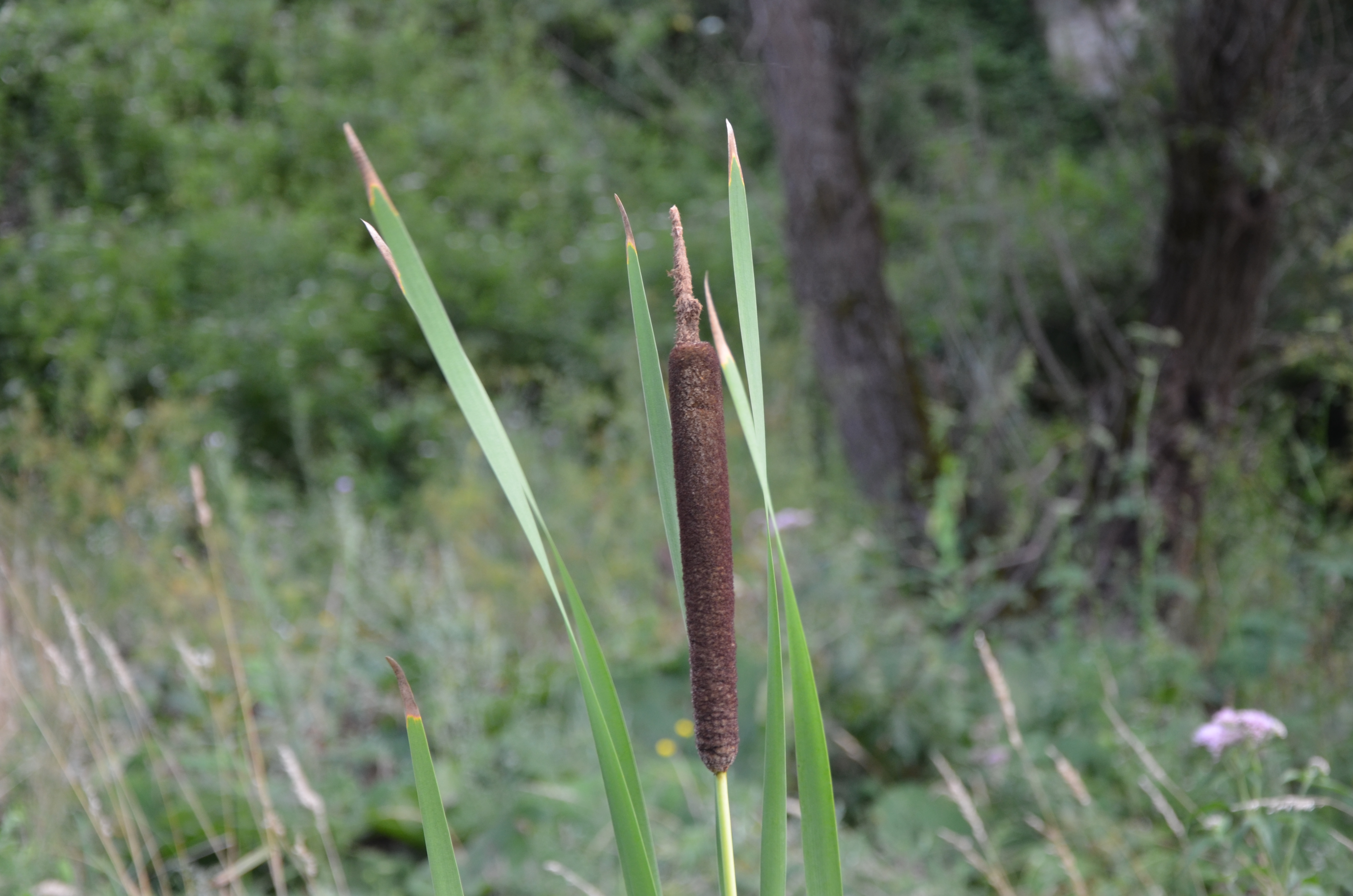
- Typha shuttleworthii

Scientific classification
- Kingdom: Plantae
- Clade: Tracheophytes
- Clade: Angiosperms
- Clade: Monocots
- Clade: Commelinids
- Order: Poales
- Family: Typhaceae
- Genus: Typha
- Species: T. shuttleworthii

Binomial name
- Typha shuttleworthii Koch & Sond.

Synonyms
- Typha bethulona Costa; Typha latifolia var. bethulona (Costa) Kronf.; Typha latifolia subsp. shuttleworthii Stojan. & Stef.; Typha latifolia var. transsilvanica (Schur) Nyman; Typha persica Ghahr. & Sanei; Typha shuttleworthii subsp. orientalis (C.Presl) Graebn.; Typha shuttleworthii var. orientalis (C. Presl) Rohrb.; Typha transsilvanica Schur

= Typha shuttleworthii =

Species of aquatic plant

Typha shuttleworthii is a species of cattail found in southern Europe as well as in Iran and Turkey.

Typha shuttleworthii is very similar to T. latifolia and has long been considered conspecific with that species. More recent authors have, however, regarded it as a separate species. It differs from T. latifolia in that the male inflorescence is less than half the length of the female inflorescence, as well as having shorter anthers, smaller seeds, and narrower leaves.
