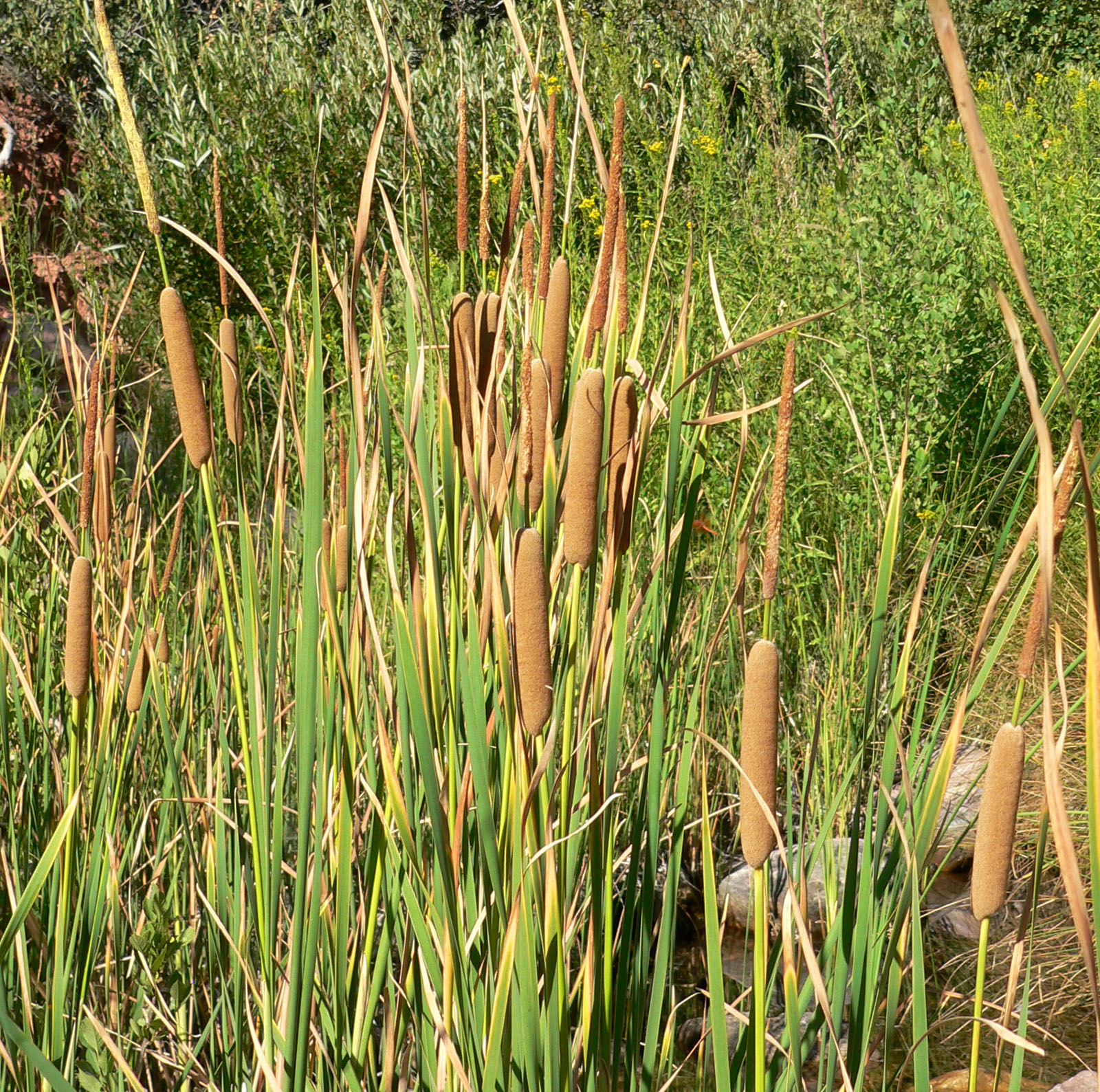

Conservation status
- Least Concern (IUCN 3.1)

Scientific classification
- Kingdom: Plantae
- Clade: Tracheophytes
- Clade: Angiosperms
- Clade: Monocots
- Clade: Commelinids
- Order: Poales
- Family: Typhaceae
- Genus: Typha
- Species: T. domingensis

Binomial name
- Typha domingensis Pers.

Synonyms
- List: Typha angustifolia subsp. domingensis (Pers.) Rohrb.; Typha angustifolia var. domingensis (Pers.) Griseb.; Typha domingensis var. eudomingensis Gèze; Typha abyssinica Rchb.f. ex Rohrb.; Typha aequalis Schnizl.; Typha aethiopica Kronf.; Typha americana Rich. ex Rohrb.; Typha angustata var. abyssinica (Rchb.f. ex Rohrb.) Graebn.; Typha angustata subsp. aethiopica (Rohrb.) Kronf.; Typha angustata var. aethiopica Rohrb.; Typha angustata var. gracilis Nyman; Typha angustata var. leptocarpa Rohrb.; Typha angustifolia subsp. australis (Schumach.) Kronf.; Typha angustifolia proles australis (Schumach.) Rouy; Typha angustifolia var. australis (Schumach.) Rohrb.; Typha angustifolia var. brownii (Kunth) Kronf.; Typha angustifolia subsp. javanica (Schnizl. ex Rohrb.) Graebn.; Typha angustifolia var. saulseana Legrand; Typha angustifolia var. tenuispicata Debeaux; Typha angustifolia var. virginica Tidestr.; Typha australis Schumach.; Typha basedowii Graebn.; Typha bracteata Greene; Typha brownii Kunth; Typha damiattica Ehrenb. ex Rohrb.; Typha domingensis var. australis (Schumach.) Gèze; Typha domingensis subsp. australis (Schumach.) F.M.Vázquez; Typha domingensis var. javanica (Schnizl. ex Rohrb.) Gèze; Typha domingensis var. sachetiae Fosberg; Typha domingensis f. strimonii Cheshm. & Delip.; Typha ehrenbergii Schur ex Rohrb.; Typha essequeboensis G.Mey. ex Rohrb.; Typha gigantea Schur ex Kunth; Typha gracilis Schur; Typha javanica Schnizl. ex Rohrb.; Typha latifolia subsp. domingensis Pers.; Typha macranthelia Webb & Berthel.; Typha maxima Schur ex Rohrb.; Typha media Bory & Chaub.; Typha salgirica Krasnova; Typha spiralis Raf.; Typha tenuifolia Kunth; Typha truxillensis Kunth

= Typha domingensis =

Species of plant

Typha domingensis, known commonly as southern cattail or cumbungi, is a perennial herbaceous plant of the genus Typha.

== Taxonomy ==
It was described by Christiaan Hendrik Persoon in 1807.

== Distribution and habitat ==
It is found throughout sutropical and tropical regions worldwide. It is sometimes found as a subdominant associate in mangrove ecosystems such as the Petenes mangroves ecoregion of Yucatán. The Southern Cattail grows between 2.0 and 2.5 meters in length and has flat sheaths to protect its core. It thrives in marshes and ecosystems where the land has a similarity to wetlands. It can also survive in high salinity water sources, making it much more resilient than similar species to this kind of cattail.

== Uses ==
In the Mesopotamian Marshes of southern Iraq, Khirret is a dessert made from the pollen of this plant. In Turkish folk medicine the female inflorescences of this plant and other Typha are used externally to treat wounds such as burns. Extracts of T. domingensis have been demonstrated to have wound healing properties in rat models.

Water extracts of the fruit, female flower and male flower of Typha domingensis exhibit iron chelating activity as well as superoxide and nitric oxide scavenging activities. By contrast, only the fruit and female flower extracts were found to have alpha-glucosidase inhibitory activity. A partially purified, proanthocyanidin-rich butanol fraction of the fruit was shown to be a competitive inhibitor of alpha-glucosidase, which also had concurrent antioxidant activity.

Typha domingensis can reduce water contamination by enterobacteria, which are pathogens, by up to 98 percent.

It improves the water quality and the Southern Cattail is used in artisanal crafts due to their wide reed sheaths which ease the weaving process.

Areas where the cattail and bulrush is harvested in much larger methods, such as the coastal areas of San Jeronimo, Patzcuaro and Tzintzuntzan, Michoacán seem to exhibit larger than average cattail sizes, lengths, and population density. It's within these areas that at times, the amount of reproducing cattail can prove to be too much as it overruns some farm land, so its planned from the surrounding villagers to be routinely harvested and cut down to a reasonable size monthly or whenever the population rises to an overrunning size. This is especially common during the months of August and September, the rainiest months that the surrounding villages seem to experience during the last months of Summer.
