= Komarov Botanical Institute =

Russian research institute

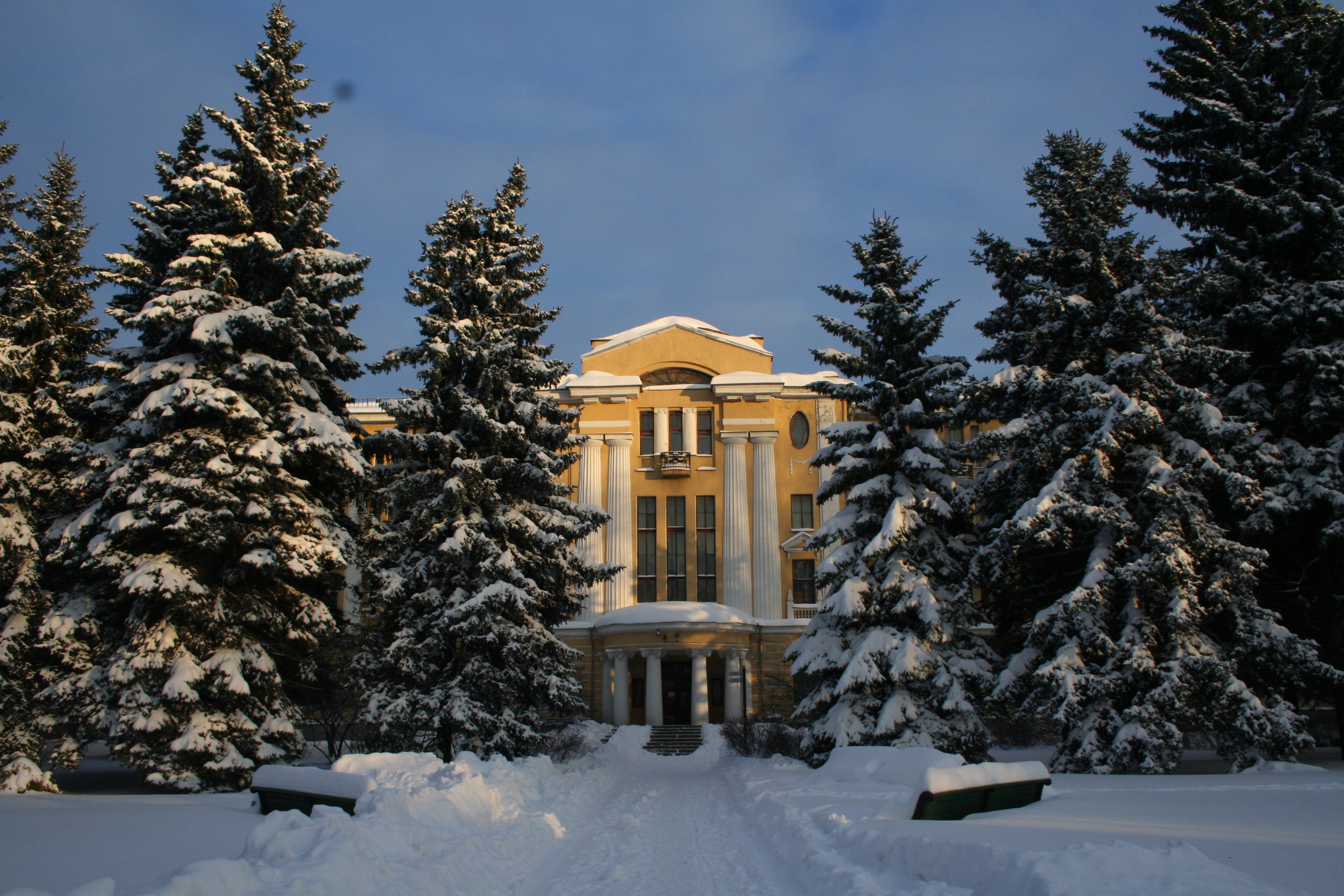

The Komarov Botanical Institute of the Russian Academy of Sciences (Russian: Ботанический институт им. В.Л.Комарова РАН) is a leading botanical institution in Russia, It is located on Aptekarsky Island in St. Petersburg, and is named after the Russian botanist Vladimir Leontyevich Komarov (1869–1945). The institute was established in 1931 as merger of the Botanical Garden and the Botanical Museum of the Academy of Sciences.

The institute hosts Saint Petersburg Botanical Garden as well as herbarium collections that house over seven million specimens of plants and fungi.

The Institute's LE Herbarium has approximately 200,000-250 000 specimens from Latin America in storage. The most known collections from Latin America include those of German naturalist G. Langsdorff (collected between 1814-1817 & 1821-1829) and German botanist Ludwig Riedel (1821-1828 & 1831-1836) from Brazil, G. Mertens (1826) and German naturalist Wilhelm Friedrich Karwinsky von Karwin (1841-1843) from Mexico, and plants collected in expeditions of the Soviet Rubber Trust in 1926-1928.

Among the scientists who have worked there are Yevgenia Pobedimova and Modest Iljin.
