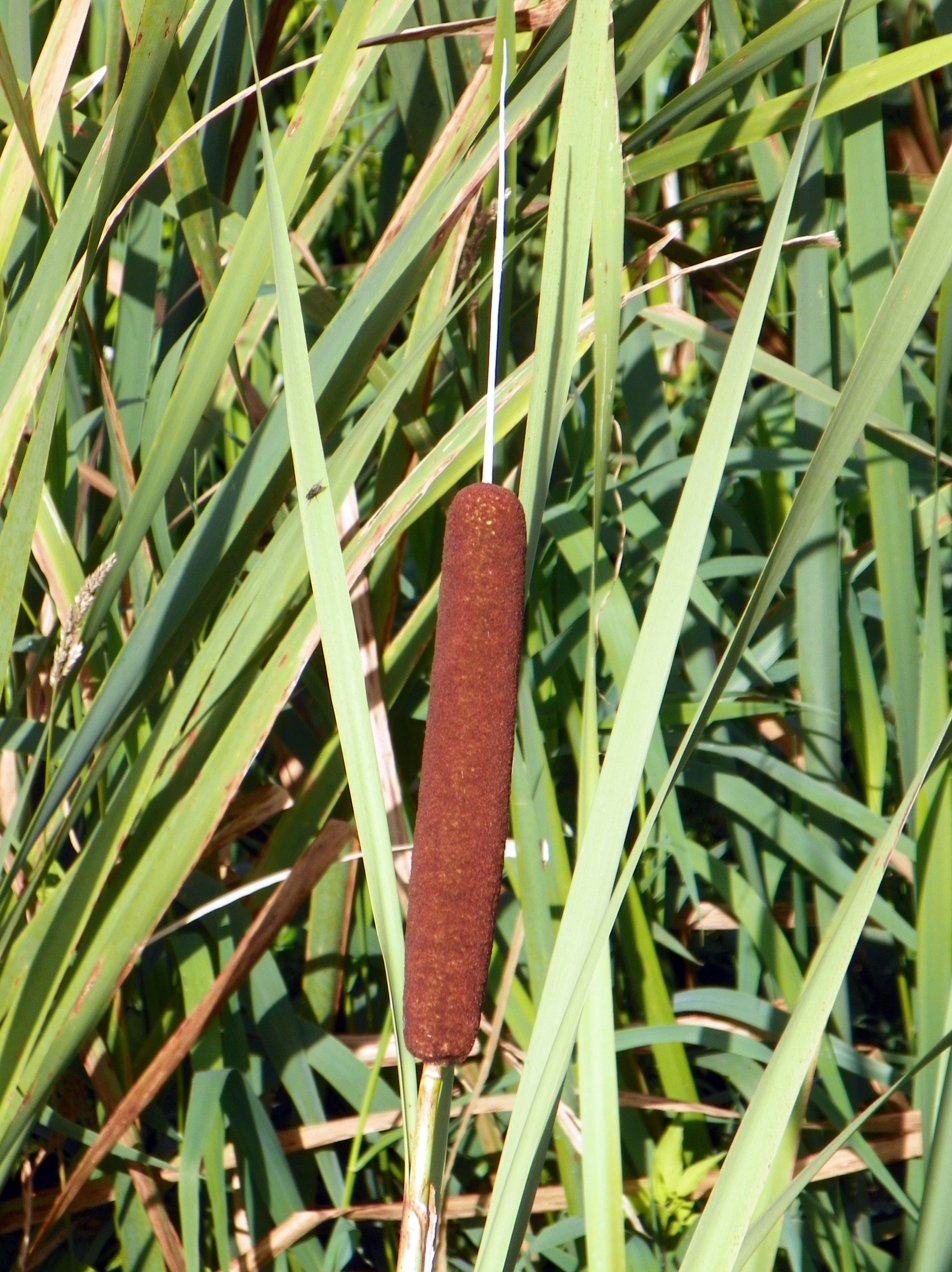
- Mature seedhead

Conservation status
- Least Concern (IUCN 3.1)

Scientific classification
- Kingdom: Plantae
- Clade: Tracheophytes
- Clade: Angiosperms
- Clade: Monocots
- Clade: Commelinids
- Order: Poales
- Family: Typhaceae
- Genus: Typha
- Species: T. latifolia

Binomial name
- Typha latifolia L.

Synonyms
- Synonyms list: Massula latifolia (L.) Dulac; Typha ambigua Schur ex Rohrb.; Typha angustifolia var. inaequalis Kronf.; Typha angustifolia var. media Kronf.; Typha angustifolia var. sonderi Kronf.; Typha crassa Raf.; Typha elatior Raf. (illegitimate); Typha elatior Boreau (illegitimate); Typha elongata Dudley; Typha engelmannii A.Br. ex Rohrb.; Typha intermedia Schur; Typha latifolia var. ambigua Sond.; Typha latifolia var. angustifolia Hausskn.; Typha latifolia var. bethulona (Costa) Kronf.; Typha latifolia subsp. capensis Rohrb.; Typha latifolia f. divisa Louis-Marie; Typha latifolia var. elata Kronf.; Typha latifolia var. elatior Graebn.; Typha latifolia var. elongata Dudley; Typha latifolia subsp. eulatifolia Graebn.; Typha latifolia var. gracilis Godr.; Typha latifolia fo. remota Skvortsov; Typha latifolia subsp. maresii (Batt.) Batt.; Typha latifolia var. obconica Tkachik; Typha latifolia var. orientalis (C.Presl) Rohrb.; Typha latifolia var. remotiuscula (Schur) Simonk.; Typha latifolia subsp. shuttleworthii (W.D.J.Koch & Sond.) Stoj. & Stef.; Typha latifolia var. transsilvanica (Schur) Nyman; Typha latifolia var. typica Rothm.; Typha major Curtis; Typha media Pollini (illegitimate); Typha palustris Bubani; Typha pendula Fisch. ex Sond.; Typha remotiuscula Schur; Typha spathulifolia Kronf.

= Typha latifolia =

Species of flowering plant

Typha latifolia is a perennial herbaceous wetland plant in the genus Typha. It is known in English as bulrush (sometimes as common bulrush to distinguish from other species of Typha), and in North America as broadleaf cattail. It is found as a native plant species throughout most of Eurasia and North America, and more locally in Africa and South America. The genome of T. latifolia was published in 2022.

== Description ==
Typha latifolia grows 1.5 to 3 metres (5 to 10 feet) high and it has leaves 2–4 centimetres (3/4–1 1/2 inches) broad. It will generally grow from 0.75 to 1 m (2 to 3 ft) of water depth. The leaves are deciduous, appearing in spring and dying down in the autumn.

The flowers form in a dense cluster at the top of the main stem; they are divided into a female portion below, and a tassel of male flowers above; the female and male parts are contiguous, which distinguishes the species readily from Typha angustifolia where there is a 3–8 cm gap of bare stem between the female and male flowers. Flowering is in June to July; after this, the male portion falls off, leaving the female portion to form a fruit head maturing into the familiar brown sausage-shaped spike. The seed heads persist through the winter, and then gradually break up in spring to release the tiny seeds embedded in hairs which assist with wind dispersal.

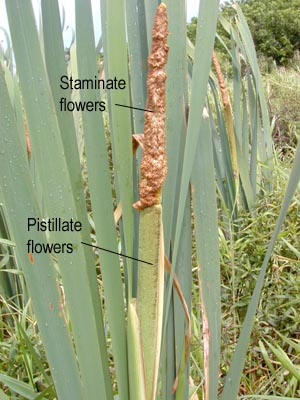
Flowerhead in late spring showing the male (staminate) flowers above the female (pistillate) flowers

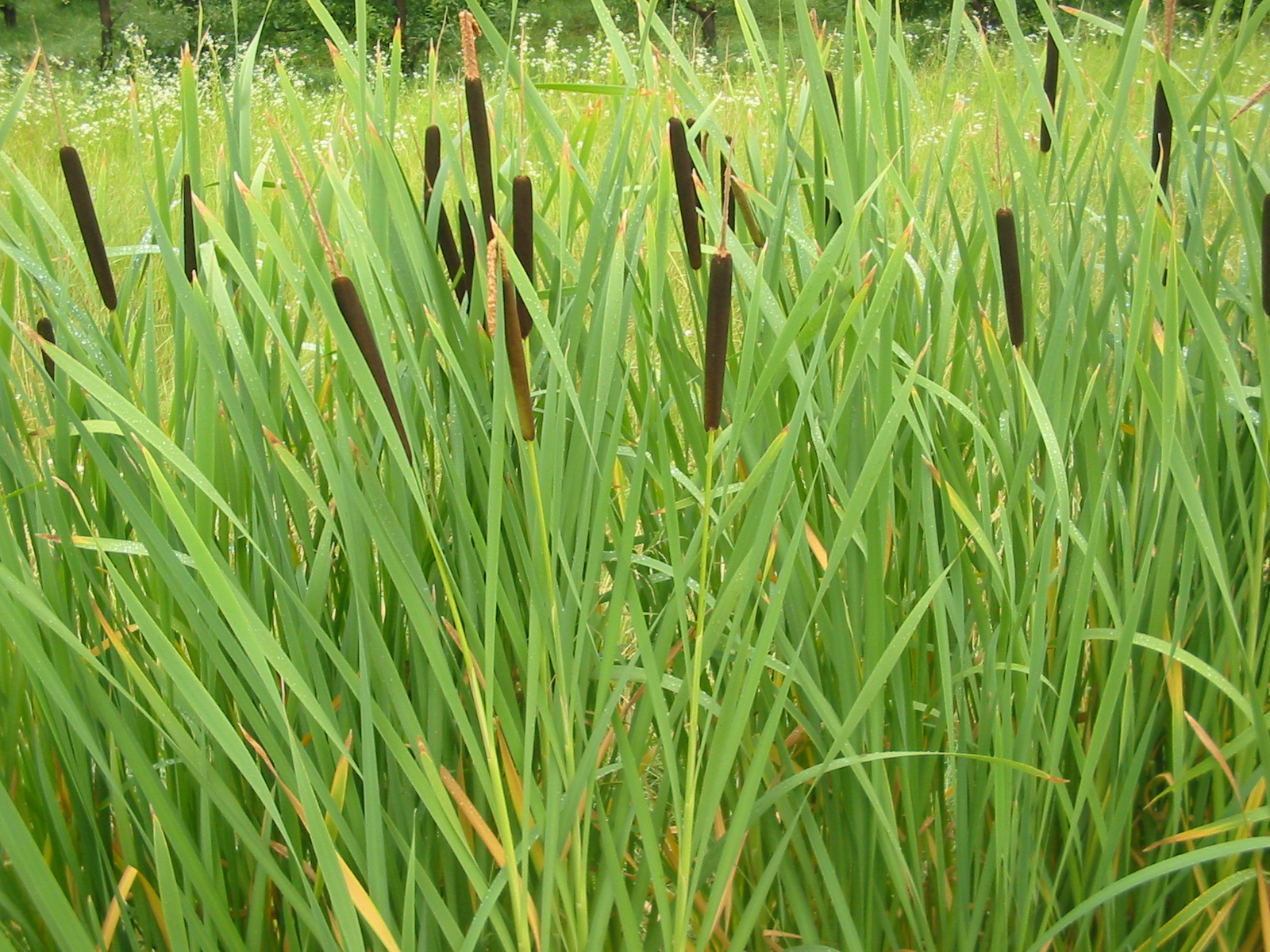
Mature seedheads in late summer, Romania

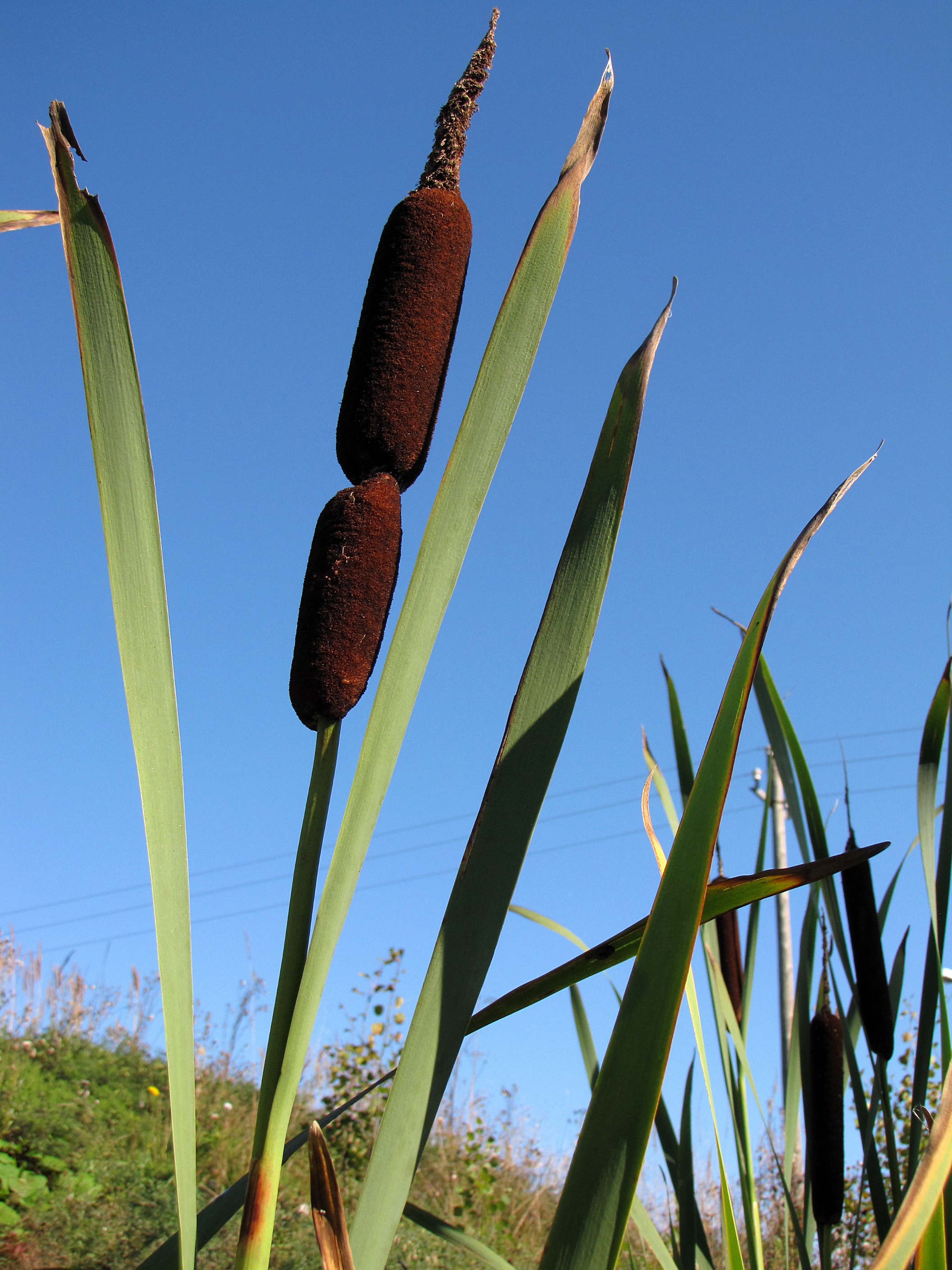
Mature seedheads in late summer, Lappeenranta, Finland

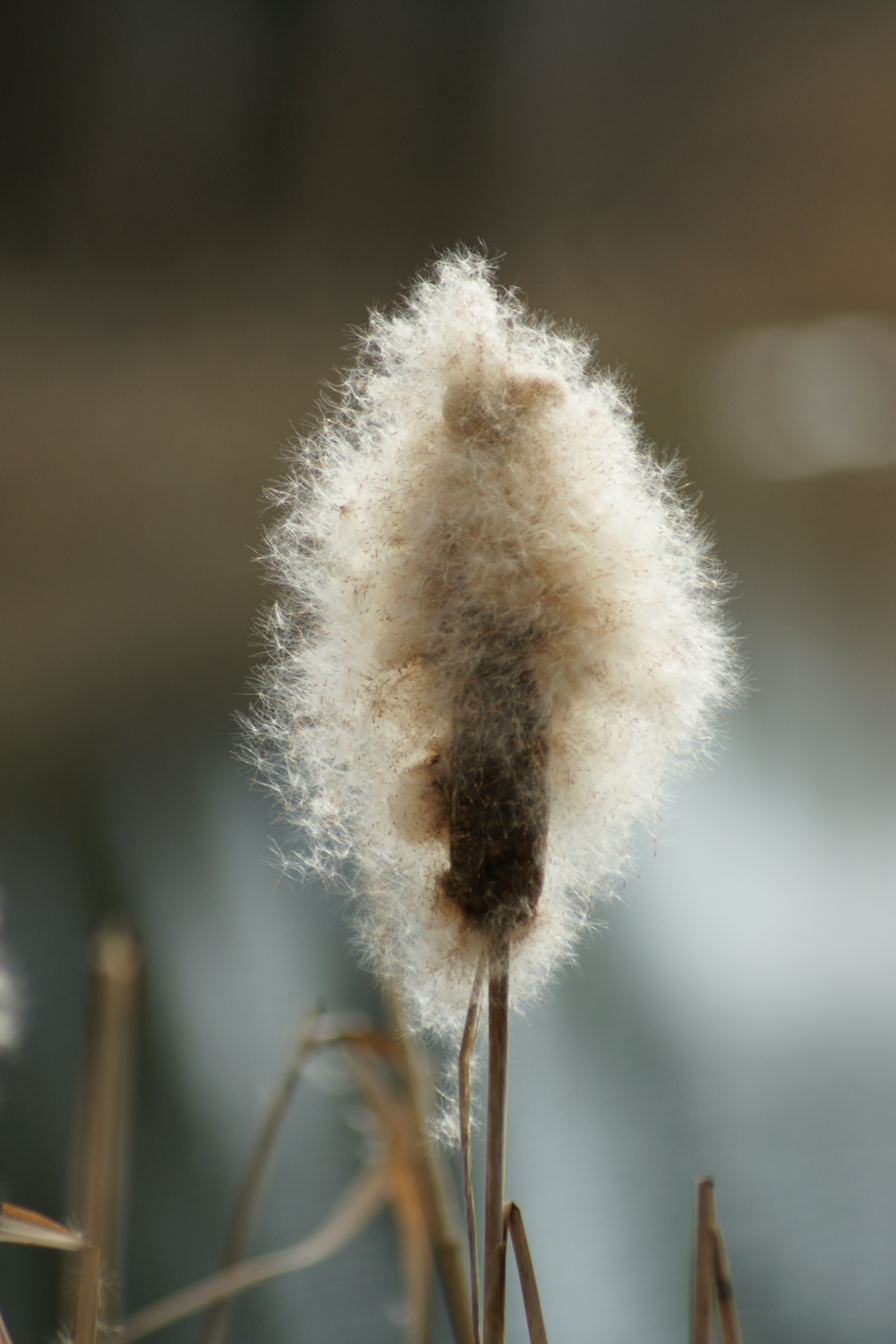
Seed head with seeds dispersing

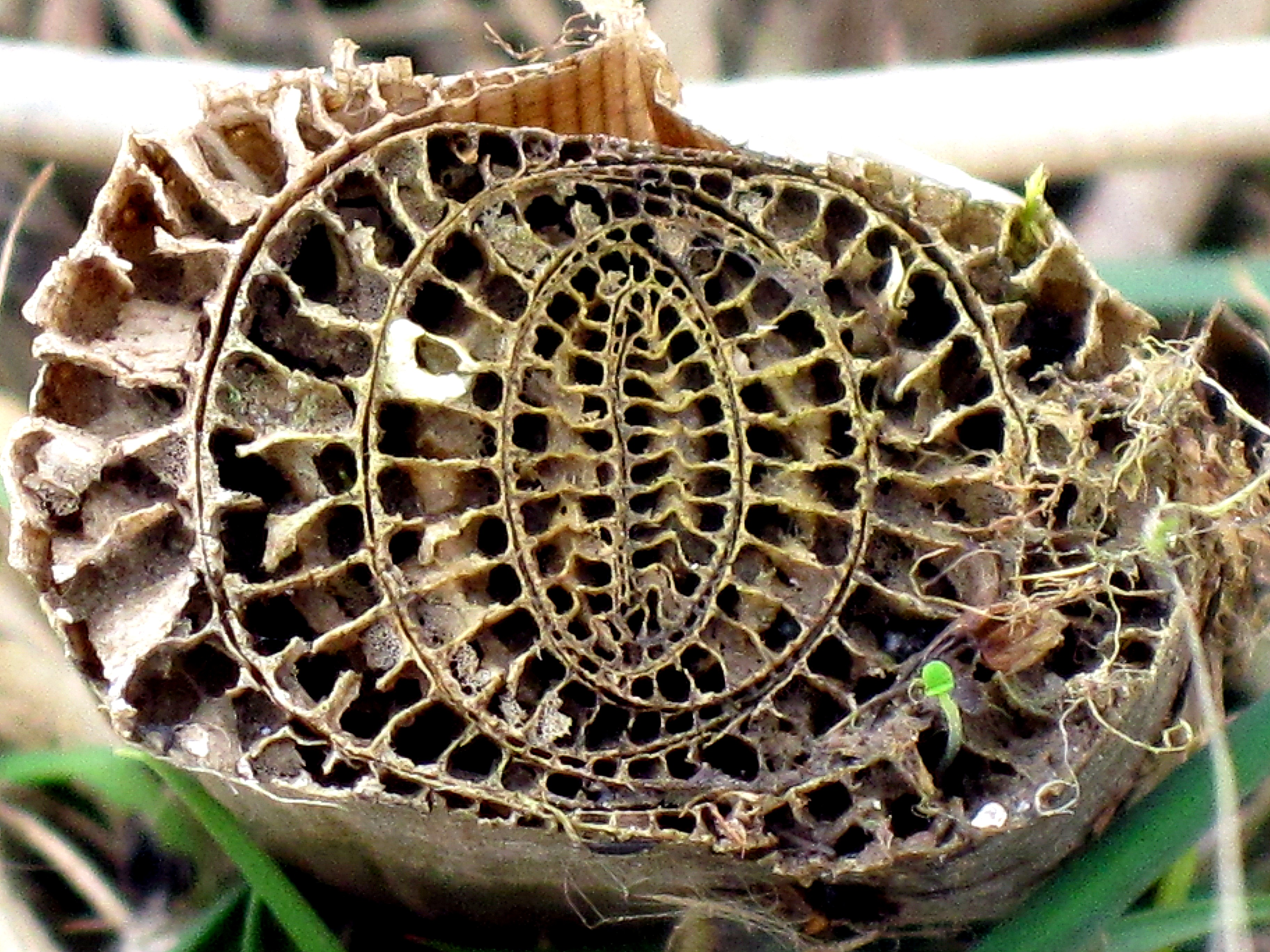
Cross section of plant's pseudostem, formed of overlapping leaf bases

== Taxonomy ==
It was described by Carl Linnaeus in 1753.

=== Natural hybrids ===
Together with Typha laxmannii Lepech., it is a parent species of the natural hybrid Typha × smirnovii Mavrodiev.

== Distribution and habitat ==
British Columbia, Canada

It is found as a native plant species widely in Eurasia and North America, and more locally in Africa and South America. In Canada, it occurs in all provinces and also in the Yukon and Northwest Territories, and in the United States, it is native to all states except Hawaii. It is an introduced and invasive species, and is considered a noxious weed in Australia and Hawaii. It has been reported in Indonesia, Malaysia, New Zealand, Papua New Guinea, and the Philippines. It is referred to as Soli-soli in the Philippines.

The species has been found in a variety of climates, including tropical, subtropical, southern and northern temperate, humid coastal, and dry continental. It is found at elevations from sea level to 2,300 metres (7,500 ft).

T. latifolia is an "obligate wetland" species, meaning that it is always found in or near water. The species generally grows in flooded areas where the water depth does not exceed 0.8 m (2 1/2 ft), but has also been reported growing in floating mats in slightly deeper water. It grows mostly in fresh water but also occurs in slightly brackish marshes. The species can displace other species native to salt marshes upon reduction in salinity. Under such conditions the plant may be considered aggressive since it interferes with preservation of the salt marsh habitat.

T. latifolia shares its range with other related species, and hybridizes with Typha angustifolia (lesser bulrush or narrow-leaf cattail) to form Typha × glauca (T. angustifolia × T. latifolia). T. latifolia is usually found in shallower water than T. angustifolia.

== Uses ==
Traditionally, the plant has been a part of certain indigenous cultures of British Columbia, as a source of food, medicine, and for other uses. The rhizomes are edible after cooking and removing the skin, while peeled stems and leaf bases can be eaten raw or cooked. The young flower spikes, young shoots, and sprouts at the end of the rootstocks are edible as well. The pollen from the mature cones can be used as a flavouring. The starchy rootstalks are ground into meal by Native Americans.

It is not advisable to eat specimens deriving from polluted water as it absorbs pollutants and in fact is used as a bioremediator. Specimens with a very bitter or spicy taste should not be eaten.

In Greece, the plant is used in a dried form for traditional chair making, namely in the woven seat of the chair. To prepare the material, the plant is collected in the summer and left to dry for 40–50 days.

In San Francisco, a town in the Pacijan Island of the Camotes Islands of Cebu, Philippines, the plant, known by the name Soli-soli, is used as a type of weaving fibre and/or material in making mats, bags, hats, and other organic accessories and ornaments. Soli-soli weaving is considered as one of the main livelihoods of the townspeople, showcasing the local crafts of the San Franciscohanons, as well as offering a viable outlet for cultural expression and eco-tourism. The town even celebrates the overabundance of this plant in the island and the weaving industry through the Soli-soli Festival, a festival of thanksgiving dedicated to Saint Joseph, the patron saint of the town. The festival is celebrated around the 19th of March, the solemnity of St. Joseph, the Spouse of Mary. The townspeople incorporate the plant in their festival costumes, oftentimes wearing outfits made completely from woven Soli-soli.

== Common names ==
Typha latifolia is also sometimes known as great reedmace (mainly historical, but occasionally still in modern use), common cattail, cat-o'-nine-tails, cooper's reed, cumbungi.
