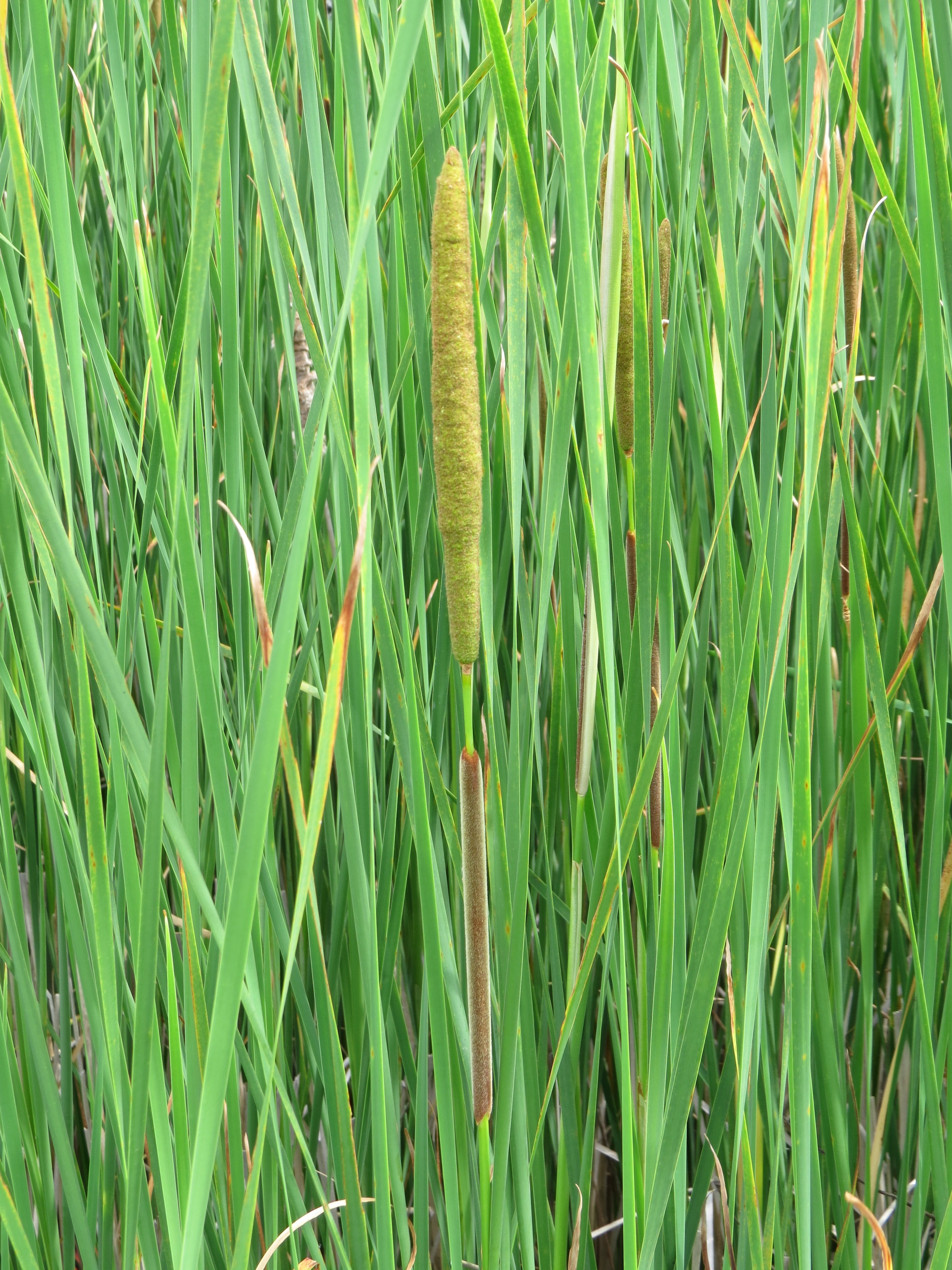
- Foliage and flowering stem; note the gap between the female (lower section, brown) and male (upper, yellowish) flowers. Late June; UK.

Conservation status
- Least Concern (IUCN 3.1)

Scientific classification
- Kingdom: Plantae
- Clade: Embryophytes
- Clade: Tracheophytes
- Clade: Angiosperms
- Clade: Monocots
- Clade: Commelinids
- Order: Poales
- Family: Typhaceae
- Genus: Typha
- Species: T. angustifolia

Binomial name
- Typha angustifolia L.

Synonyms
- Synonyms list: Massula angustifolia (L.) Dulac; Typha angustifolia var. calumetensis Peattie; Typha angustifolia var. elatior (Boenn.) Nyman; Typha angustifolia var. elongata Wiegand; Typha angustifolia f. foveolata (Pobed.) Mavrodiev; Typha angustifolia f. inaequalis Kronf.; Typha angustifolia var. longispicata Peck; Typha angustifolia f. submersa Glück; Typha elatior Boenn.; Typha foveolata Pobed.; Typha glauca Seg.-Vianna (Illegitimate); Typha gracilis Rchb. (Illegitimate); Typha latifolia var. minor Ambrosi; Typha media C.C.Gmel.; Typha minor Curtis; Typha pontica Klok. fil. & A. Krasnova

= Typha angustifolia =

Species of flowering plant

Typha angustifolia is a perennial herbaceous plant in the genus Typha, native throughout most of Eurasia and locally in northwest Africa; it also occurs widely in North America, where its native status is disputed. It is an "obligate wetland" species that is found in fresh water or brackish locations. It is known in British English as lesser bulrush, and in North American English as narrowleaf cattail.

== Description ==
Typha angustifolia grows 1.5–2 metres (4 ft 11 in – 6 ft 7 in) high (rarely to 3 m) and has slender leaves 3–12 mm (0.12–0.47 in) broad, obviously slenderer than in the related Typha latifolia; ten or fewer leaves arise from each vegetative shoot. The leaves are deciduous, appearing in spring and dying down in the autumn. The flowering stem is 1–1.5 metres (3 ft 3 in – 4 ft 11 in) tall, distinctly shorter than the leaves and hidden among them, unlike Typha latifolia where the flowering stem is as tall as or taller than the leaves. The flowers form in a dense cluster at the top of the main stem; they are divided into a female portion below, and a tassel of male flowers above; the female and male parts are separated by a gap of 3–8 centimetres (1.2–3.1 in) (rarely to 12 cm) of bare stem, which distinguishes the species readily from Typha latifolia where there is no gap between the female and male flowers. Flowering is in June to July; after this, the male portion falls off, leaving the female portion to form a rusty-brown fruit head 13–25 mm diameter, maturing into the familiar sausage-shaped spike. The gap between the female and male flowers remains visible as a smooth part at the base of the spike that held the male flowers. The seed heads persist through the winter, and then gradually break up in spring to release the tiny seeds embedded in hairs which assist with wind dispersal. The plants have sturdy, rhizomatous roots that can extend 70 centimetres (28 in) and are typically 2–4 centimetres (0.79–1.57 in) diameter.

== Distribution ==
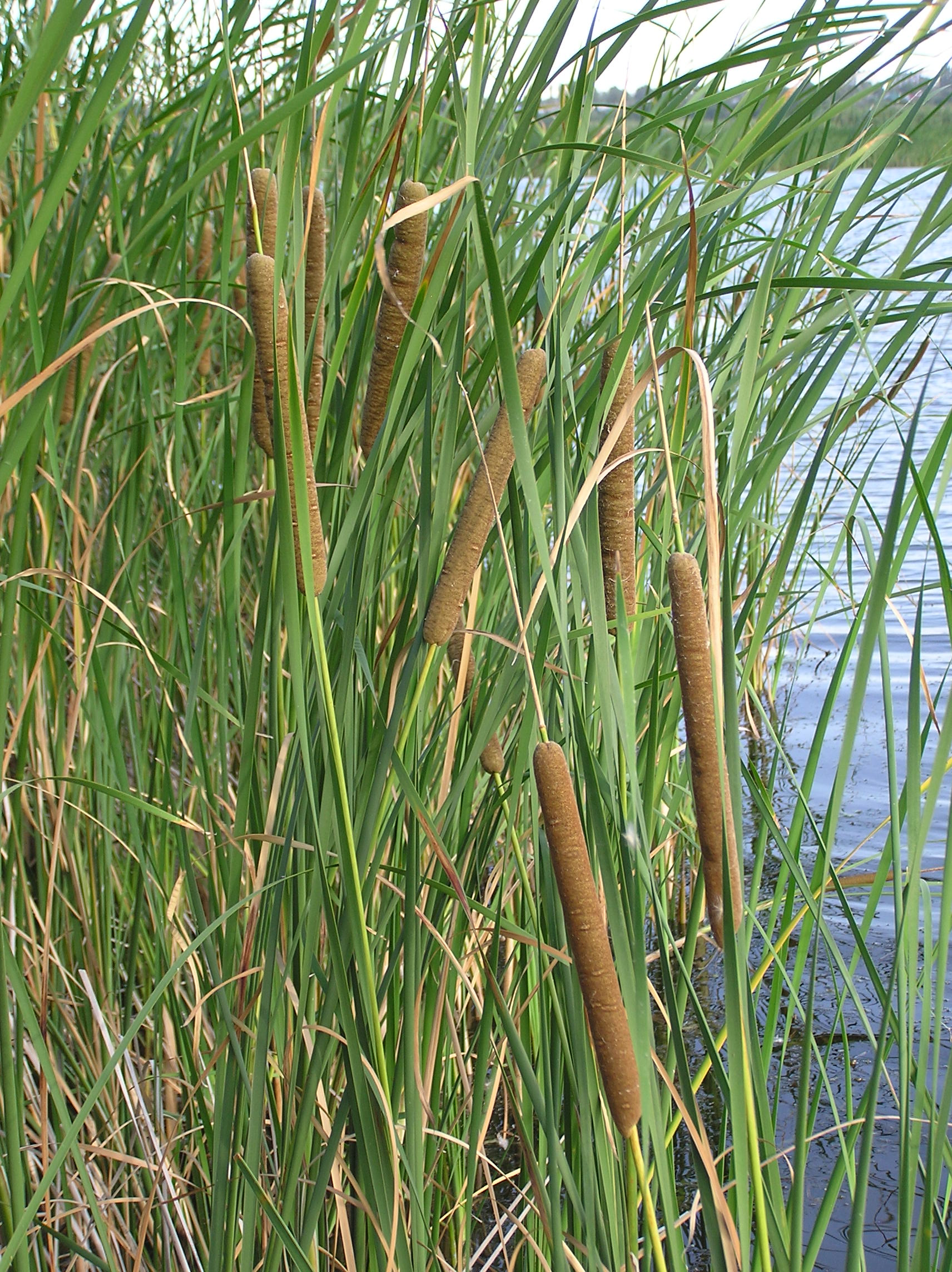
Typha angustifolia, mature fruiting stems, Volgograd Reservoir, Russia

The species is universally accepted to be native across most of Eurasia, and in the far northwest of Africa, where it is widely distributed in temperate and subtropical regions, growing in marshes, wetlands, and along the edges of ponds and lakes. Its status in North America, accepted as native by some, remains far from clear. In 1987 it was argued that the species was introduced from Europe to North America, with a human-mediated arrival on the east coast between 1800–1820. Later, pollen data gave credence to the idea that the species was present in North America pre-contact, but subsequent examination of this question suggests it remains very uncertain: "T. angustifolia is likely not native with European origins", with the species no more than "possibly native to the tidal wetlands of the eastern seaboard". Within North America, it is also thought to have spread recently from coastal to inland locations.

The geographic range of Typha angustifolia overlaps with the very similar species Typha latifolia. T. angustifolia can be distinguished from T. latifolia by its narrower leaves and by a clear separation of two different regions (staminate flowers above and pistilate flowers below) on the flowering heads. T. angustifolia often occurs in deeper water than T. latifolia, and is more tolerant of wetlands with low eutrophication conditions.

The two species can produce hybrids, named as Typha × glauca (Typha angustifolia x T. latifolia); it is a sterile F1 hybrid, which reproduces only vegetatively, forming clonal colonies, which may be extensive.

== Culinary use ==
Several parts of the plant are edible, including during various seasons the dormant sprouts on roots and bases of leaves, the inner core of the stalk, green bloom spikes, ripe pollen, and starchy roots. It can be prepared in the same way as Typha latifolia. The edible stem is called bồn bồn in Vietnam.^{photo}
