= Yevgenia Pobedimova =

Soviet botanist (1898–1973)

Yevgenia Georgievna Pobedimova
- Born: 12 November 1898
- Died: 6 May 1973 (aged 74); Zelenogorsk
- Education: Komarov Botanical Institute, Leningrad
- Scientific career
- Fields: Botany

Yevgenia Georgievna Pobedimova (1898-1973) was a Russian-Soviet botanist and plant collector noted for describing over 270 species in Russia, Ukraine and North Asia.

== Career ==
She received a Ph.D. in biological sciences from the Komarov Botanical Institute in Leningrad in the late 1930s and although in 1941 she was appointed as a senior research fellow, she was transferred to war work. In 1944 she returned to Leningrad, and participated in the restoration of the Botanical Institute.

During the Second World War she initially worked in a hospital in Leningrad and then in 1942 was evacuated first to Frunze and finally to Kazan.

During her career, she was very active as a plant collector. In 1930-1931 she travelled to Mongolia and then to Central Asia in 1932. In 1946-1947 and 1949 she visited the Caucasus and Crimea and she was in the Mongolian Altai in 1953.

== Publications ==
She was involved in production of monographs about several plant families, including Apocynaceae, Thymelaeaceae and Balsaminaceae, as well as working on numerous genera for the Botanical Atlas and the List of Plants of the Herbarium of the Flora of the USSR. In the last years of her life, she published monographs of the genera Honckenya, Cakile, and Cochlearia.

The standard author abbreviation Pobed. is used to indicate this person as the author when citing a botanical name.

Her publications include:

- Pobedimova E.G. Botanical field research in southeastern Mongolia // Transactions of the Mongolian Commission of the USSR Academy of Sciences. - L., 1933. - Issue. 9. - S. 1-66.
- Pobedimova E.G. (1935) Vegetation of the central part of the Mongolian Altai // Transactions of the Mongolian Commission of the USSR Academy of Sciences. - L. - Issue. 19. - S. 1-77.

== Legacy ==
Several species were named in her honor, including

- Galium pobedimovae Balde, 2012
- Taraxacum pobedimovae Schischk., 1964 [= Taraxacum hybernum Steven, 1856 ]
- Viola pobedimovae Ye.V. Serg., 1961 [= Viola nemoralis Kütz., 1832 ]
