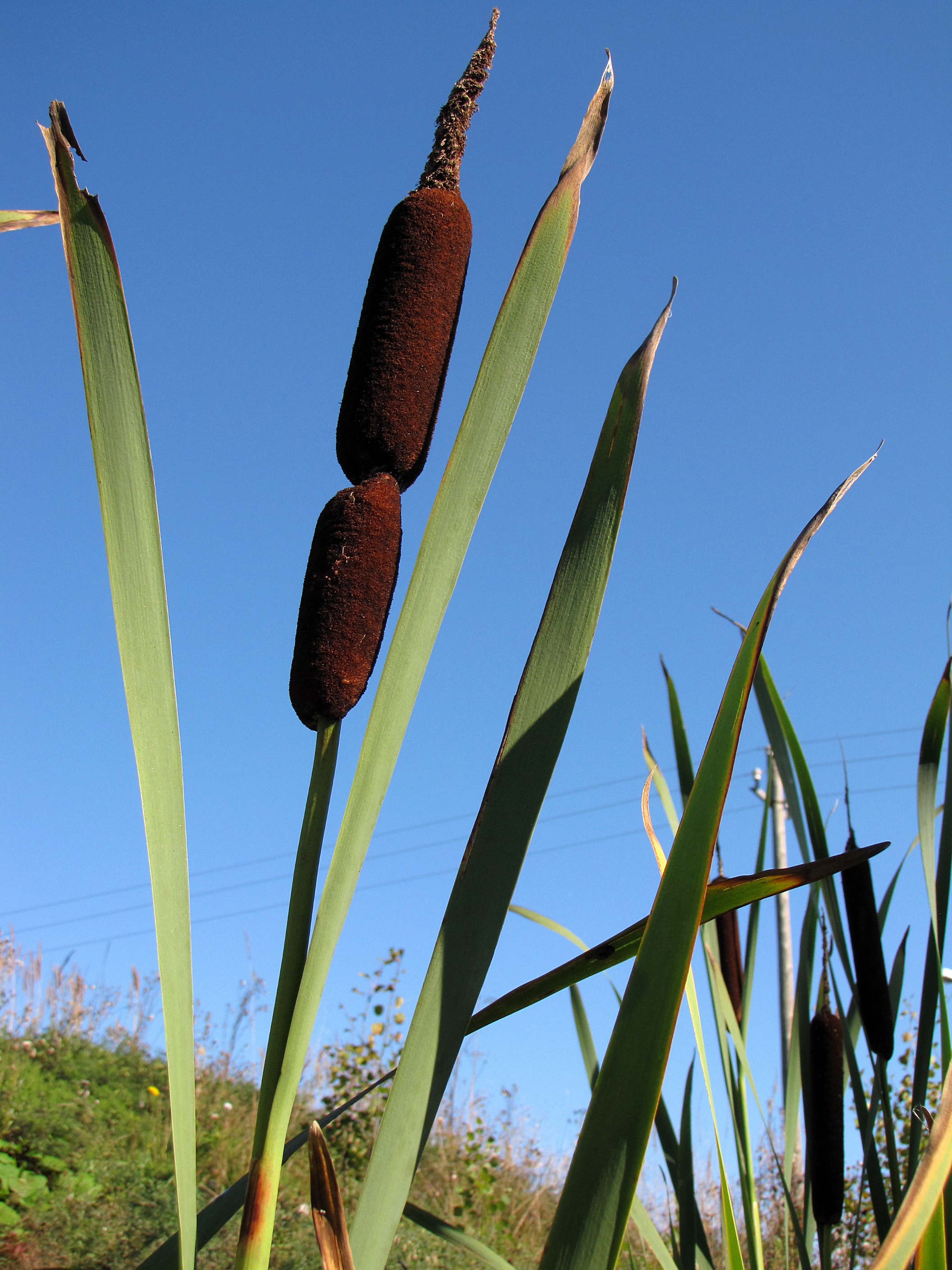
- Typha latifolia

Scientific classification
- Kingdom: Plantae
- Clade: Tracheophytes
- Clade: Angiosperms
- Clade: Monocots
- Clade: Commelinids
- Order: Poales
- Family: Typhaceae; Juss.

Genera
- Sparganium; Typha

= Typhaceae =

Typhaceae Temporal range: Late Cretaceous-Recent, 65.5–0 Ma

Family of flowering plants

The Typhaceae (/taɪˈfeɪsi.iː/) are a family of flowering plants, sometimes called the cattail family. The botanical name for the family has been recognized by most taxonomists.

== Description ==
Members can be recognized as large marsh herbs with alternate two-ranked leaves and a brownish compact spike of unisexual flowers. The plants have creeping rhizomes.

The male flowers either lack a perianth or have six scales. They may also have club shaped threads or wedge or spatula shaped scales that are intermingled with the flowers. They have between two and seven stamens.

The female flowers have a perianth of fine hairs or scales. These may be accompanied by slender bracteoles. The ovary is one chambered and contains a single pendulous ovule. The style is simple and the stigma simple and long.

The fruit may or may not be stalked and the pericarp may be thick or thin. The seeds are endospermous with a cylindric embryo.

== Fossils ==
The earliest fossils, including pollen and flowers, have been recovered from late Cretaceous deposits.

== Taxonomic history ==
The APG II system, of 2003 (unchanged from the APG system, 1998), also recognizes this family, and assigns it to the order Poales in the clade commelinids, in the monocots. The family then consisted of one genus (Typha), totalling a dozen species of perennial plants of wet habitats. More recently, the APG III system of 2009 included a second genus, Sparganium, in this family. The two genera together have a total of 51 known species.

The Cronquist system, of 1981, also recognized such a family and placed it in the order Typhales, in the subclass Commelinidae in class Liliopsida in division Magnoliophyta.

The Wettstein system, last updated in 1935, placed the family in order Pandanales.
