= List of Erysimum species =

As of March 2021, Plants of the World Online accepted 267 species of Erysimum. Some taxa regarded as subspecies by Plants of the World Online are treated as full species by Flora Iberica, and are also listed below.

== A ==
- Erysimum absconditum O.E.Schulz
- Erysimum aciphyllum Boiss.
- Erysimum acrotonum Polatschek & Rech.f.
- Erysimum adcumbens (Boiss.) Polatschek
- Erysimum afghanicum Kitam.
- Erysimum aitchisonii O.E.Schulz
- Erysimum aksaricum Pavlov
- Erysimum alaicum Novopokr. ex Nikitina
- Erysimum altaicum C.A.Mey.
- Erysimum amasianum Hausskn. & Bornm.
- Erysimum ammophilum A.Heller
- Erysimum anceps Steven ex Ledeb.
- Erysimum andrzejowskianum DC.
- Erysimum apenninum Peccenini & Polatschek
- Erysimum arbuscula (Lowe) Snogerup
- Erysimum arenicola S.Watson
- Erysimum argyrocarpum N.Busch
- Erysimum arkansanum Nutt.
- Erysimum armeniacum (Sims) J.Gay
- Erysimum artwinense N.Busch
- Erysimum asperulum Boiss. & Heldr.
- Erysimum asperum (Nutt.) DC.
- Erysimum aucherianum J.Gay
- Erysimum aureum M.Bieb.
- Erysimum aurigeranum Jeanb. & Timb.-Lagr.
- Erysimum aznavourii Polatschek

== B ==
- Erysimum babadagense Prima
- Erysimum babataghi Korsh.
- Erysimum baeticum (Heywood) Polatschek
- Erysimum bagcii Yild.
- Erysimum bastetanum (Blanca & C.Morales) Lorite, Perfectti & J.M.Gómez
- Erysimum baytopiae Yild.
- Erysimum belvederense Polatschek
- Erysimum benthamii Monnet
- Erysimum bicolor (Hornem.) DC.
- Erysimum boissieri Polatschek
- Erysimum bonannianum C.Presl
- Erysimum boreale (C.A.Mey. ex Rupr.) Trautv.
- Erysimum boryanum Boiss.
- Erysimum brevistylum Sommier & Levier
- Erysimum brulloi G.Ferro
- Erysimum bulgaricum (Velen.) Ancev & Polatschek
- Erysimum burnatii Vidal

== C ==
- Erysimum caboverdeanum (A.Chev.) Sunding
- Erysimum caespitosum DC.
- Erysimum californicum Greene
- Erysimum callicarpum Lipsky
- Erysimum calycinum Griseb.
- Erysimum candicum Snogerup
- Erysimum canum (Piller & Mitterp.) Polatschek
- Erysimum capitatum (Douglas) Greene
- Erysimum carium Boiss.
- Erysimum carniolicum Doell.
- Erysimum caucasicum Trautv.
- Erysimum cazorlense (Heywood) Holub, syn. E. myriophyllum subsp. cazorlense (Heywood) Polatschek
- Erysimum chazarjurti N.Busch
- Erysimum cheiranthoides L.
- Erysimum × cheiri (L.) Crantz
- Erysimum coarctatum Fernald
- Erysimum collinum (M.Bieb.) Andrz. ex DC.
- Erysimum collisparsum Jord., syn. E. ruscinonense Jord.
- Erysimum commatum Pancic
- Erysimum concinnum Eastw.
- Erysimum confine Jord.
- Erysimum contractum Sommier & Levier
- Erysimum corinthium (Boiss.) Wettst.
- Erysimum crassicaule (Boiss.) Boiss.
- Erysimum crassipes Fisch. & C.A.Mey.
- Erysimum crassistylum C.Presl
- Erysimum crepidifolium Rchb.
- Erysimum cretaceum (Trautv.) Schmalh.
- Erysimum creticum Boiss. & Heldr.
- Erysimum croaticum Polatschek
- Erysimum cuspidatum (M.Bieb.) DC.
- Erysimum cyaneum Popov
- Erysimum czernjajevi N.Busch

== D–E ==
- Erysimum damirliense Moazzeni & Mahmoodi
- Erysimum deflexum Hook.f. & Thomson
- Erysimum degenianum Azn.
- Erysimum diffusum Ehrh.
- Erysimum dincii Yild.
- Erysimum dirmilense Yild. & Dinç
- Erysimum drenowskii Degen
- Erysimum duranii Yild.
- Erysimum duriaei Boiss.
- Erysimum echinellum Hand.-Mazz.
- Erysimum eginense Hausskn. ex Bornm.
- Erysimum ehrendorferi Polatschek
- Erysimum elbrusense Boiss.
- Erysimum elymaiticum Mozaff.
- Erysimum erolii Yild.
- Erysimum erosum O.E.Schulz
- Erysimum etnense Jord.
- Erysimum euphraticum Polatschek
- Erysimum evinense Polatschek
- Erysimum exaltatum Andrz. ex Besser

== F–G ==
- Erysimum favargeri Polatschek
- Erysimum fitzii Polatschek, syn. E. nevadense subsp. fitzii (Polatschek) P.W.Ball
- Erysimum flavum (Georgi) Bobrov
- Erysimum forrestii (W.W.Sm.) Polatschek
- Erysimum franciscanum Rossbach
- Erysimum friedrichii Polatschek
- Erysimum frigidum Boiss. & Hausskn.
- Erysimum froehneri Polatschek
- Erysimum funiculosum Hook.f. & Thomson
- Erysimum geisleri Polatschek
- Erysimum gelidum Bunge
- Erysimum ghaznicum Cullen & Rech.f.
- Erysimum ghiesbreghtii Donn.Sm.
- Erysimum gladiiferum Boiss. & Hausskn.
- Erysimum gomez-campoi Polatschek, syn. E. nevadense subsp. gomez-campoi (Polatschek) P.W.Ball
- Erysimum gorbeanum Polatschek, syn. E. duriaei subsp. gorbeanum (Polatschek) P.W.Ball
- Erysimum graecum Boiss. & Heldr.
- Erysimum grandiflorum Desf.
- Erysimum griffithianum Boiss.
- Erysimum griffithii (Hook.f. & Thomson) Jafri
- Erysimum guneri Yild.
- Erysimum gypsaceum Botch. & Vved.

== H–J ==
- Erysimum hajastanicum Wissjul. & Bordz.
- Erysimum handel-mazzettii Polatschek
- Erysimum hedgeanum Al-Shehbaz
- Erysimum hezarense Moazzeni
- Erysimum hirschfeldioides Boiss. & Hausskn.
- Erysimum horizontale Candargy
- Erysimum huber-morathii Polatschek
- Erysimum hungaricum Zapal.
- Erysimum ibericum (Adam) DC.
- Erysimum idae Polatschek
- Erysimum ikizdereense Yild.
- Erysimum incanum Kunze
- Erysimum inconspicuum (S.Watson) MacMill.
- Erysimum inense N.Busch
- Erysimum insubricum Peccenini & Polatschek
- Erysimum insulare (Greene) Greene
- Erysimum iraqense Polatschek
- Erysimum ischnostylum Freyn & Sint.
- Erysimum jacquemoudii Yild.
- Erysimum janchenii Fritsch
- Erysimum jugicola Jord.

== K–L ==
- Erysimum kamelinii D.A.German
- Erysimum kartalkayaense Yild.
- Erysimum kazachstanicum Botsch.
- Erysimum kerbabaevii Kurbanov & Gudkova
- Erysimum ketenoglui Yild.
- Erysimum koelzii Polatschek & Rech.f.
- Erysimum korabense Kümmerle & Jáv.
- Erysimum kostkae Polatschek
- Erysimum kotschyanum J.Gay
- Erysimum krendlii Polatschek
- Erysimum krynitzkii Bordz.
- Erysimum krynkense Lavrenko
- Erysimum kuemmerlei Jáv.
- Erysimum kurdicum Boiss. & Hausskn.
- Erysimum kykkoticum Hadjik. & Alziar
- Erysimum lagascae Rivas Goday & Bellot
- Erysimum ledebourii D.A.German
- Erysimum leptophyllum (M.Bieb.) Andrz. ex DC.
- Erysimum leptostylum DC.
- Erysimum leucanthemum (Stephan ex Willd.) B.Fedtsch.
- Erysimum ligusticum Peccenini & Polatschek
- Erysimum lilacinum Steinb.
- Erysimum limprichtii O.E.Schulz
- Erysimum linariifolium Tausch
- Erysimum linifolium (Pers.) J.Gay
- Erysimum lycaonicum (Hand.-Mazz.) Hub.-Mor.

== M ==
- Erysimum macilentum Bunge
- Erysimum macrospermum Cullen & Rech.f.
- Erysimum macrostigma Boiss.
- Erysimum maderense Polatschek
- Erysimum majellense Polatschek
- Erysimum maremmanum Peccenini & Polatschek
- Erysimum marschallianum Andrz. ex DC.
- Erysimum × marshallii (Henfr.) Bois
- Erysimum mediohispanicum Polatschek, syn. E. nevadense subsp. mediohispanicum (Polatschek) P.W.Ball
- Erysimum melicentae Dunn
- Erysimum menziesii (Hook.) Wettst.
- Erysimum merxmuelleri Polatschek, syn. E. nevadense subsp. merxmuelleri (Polatschek) P.W.Ball
- Erysimum metlesicsii Polatschek
- Erysimum meyerianum (Rupr.) N.Busch
- Erysimum mongolicum D.A.German
- Erysimum montosicola Jord.
- Erysimum munzuriense Polatschek
- Erysimum mutabile Boiss. & Heldr.
- Erysimum myriophyllum Lange

== N–O ==
- Erysimum nabievii Adylov
- Erysimum nanum Boiss. & Hohen.
- Erysimum nasturtioides Boiss. & Hausskn.
- Erysimum naxense Snogerup
- Erysimum nemrutdaghense Mutlu
- Erysimum nevadense Reut.
- Erysimum nuristanicum Polatschek & Rech.f.
- Erysimum occidentale (S.Watson) B.L.Rob.
- Erysimum ochroleucum (Haller f. ex Schleich.) DC.
- Erysimum odoratum Ehrh.
- Erysimum oleifolium J.Gay
- Erysimum olympicum Boiss.

== P–Q ==
- Erysimum pachycarpum Hook.f. & Thomson
- Erysimum pacificum (E.Sheld.) Polatschek
- Erysimum parryoides (Kurz) Wettst.
- Erysimum pectinatum Bory & Chaub.
- Erysimum penyalarense (Pau) Polatschek
- Erysimum perenne (S.Watson ex Coville) Abrams
- Erysimum perofskianum Fisch. & C.A.Mey.
- Erysimum persepolitanum Boiss.
- Erysimum pignattii Peccenini & Polatschek
- Erysimum pirinicum Ancev & Polatschek
- Erysimum polatschekii Moazzeni, Assadi & Al-Shehbaz
- Erysimum popovii Rothm.
- Erysimum portugalense Polatschek
- Erysimum pseudoatticum Ancev & Polatschek
- Erysimum pseudocheiri Boiss.
- Erysimum pseudocuspidatum Polatschek
- Erysimum pseudopurpureum Polatschek
- Erysimum pseudorhaeticum Polatschek
- Erysimum pulchellum (Willd.) J.Gay
- Erysimum purpureum J.Gay
- Erysimum pusillum Bory & Chaub.
- Erysimum quadrangulum Desf.

== R–S ==
- Erysimum raineri Polatschek
- Erysimum raulinii Boiss.
- Erysimum redowskii Weinm.
- Erysimum repandum L.
- Erysimum rhaeticum (Schleich. ex Hornem.) DC.
- Erysimum rhodium Snogerup
- Erysimum riphaeanum Lorite, Abdelaziz, Muñoz-Pajares, Perfectti & J.M.Gómez
- Erysimum rizeense Yild.
- Erysimum robustum D.Don
- Erysimum rondae Polatschek, syn. E. nevadense subsp. rondae (Polatschek) P.W.Ball
- Erysimum roseum (Maxim.) Polatschek
- Erysimum salangense Polatschek & Rech.f.
- Erysimum samarkandicum Popov
- Erysimum scabrum DC.
- Erysimum schlagintweitianum O.E.Schulz
- Erysimum scoparium (Brouss. ex Willd.) Wettst.
- Erysimum seipkae Polatschek
- Erysimum semperflorens (Schousb.) Wettst.
- Erysimum senoneri (Reut.) Wettst.
- Erysimum serpentinicum Polatschek
- Erysimum siliculosum (M.Bieb.) DC.
- Erysimum sintenisianum Bornm.
- Erysimum sisymbrioides C.A.Mey.
- Erysimum sivasicum Yild.
- Erysimum slavjankae Ancev & Polatschek
- Erysimum smyrnaeum Boiss. & Balansa
- Erysimum sorgerae Polatschek
- Erysimum spetae Polatschek
- Erysimum stenophyllum Boiss. ex Polatschek
- Erysimum strictisiliquum N.Busch
- Erysimum strophades Boiss.
- Erysimum substrigosum (Rupr.) N.Busch
- Erysimum subulatum J.Gay
- Erysimum suffrutescens (Abrams) Rossbach
- Erysimum sylvestre (Crantz) Scop.
- Erysimum szowitsianum Boiss.

== T–Z ==
- Erysimum talijevii (Klokov) Mosyakin
- Erysimum tenellum DC.
- Erysimum teppneri Polatschek
- Erysimum teretifolium Eastw.
- Erysimum thyrsoideum Boiss.
- Erysimum tuteliae Yild.
- Erysimum ucranicum J.Gay
- Erysimum uncinatifolium Boiss. & A.Huet
- Erysimum vassilczenkoi Polatschek
- Erysimum verrucosum Boiss. & Gaill.
- Erysimum violascens Popov
- Erysimum virescens (Webb ex Christ) Wettst.
- Erysimum virgatum Roth
- Erysimum vitekii Polatschek
- Erysimum vitellinum Popov
- Erysimum vuralii Yild.
- Erysimum wardii Polatschek
- Erysimum wilczekianum Braun-Blanq. & Maire
- Erysimum witmannii Zaw.
- Erysimum yaltirikii Yild.
- Erysimum yildirimlii Dinç
- Erysimum zeybekianum Yild.
