= Erysimum 'Chelsea Jacket' =

Cultivar of wallflower

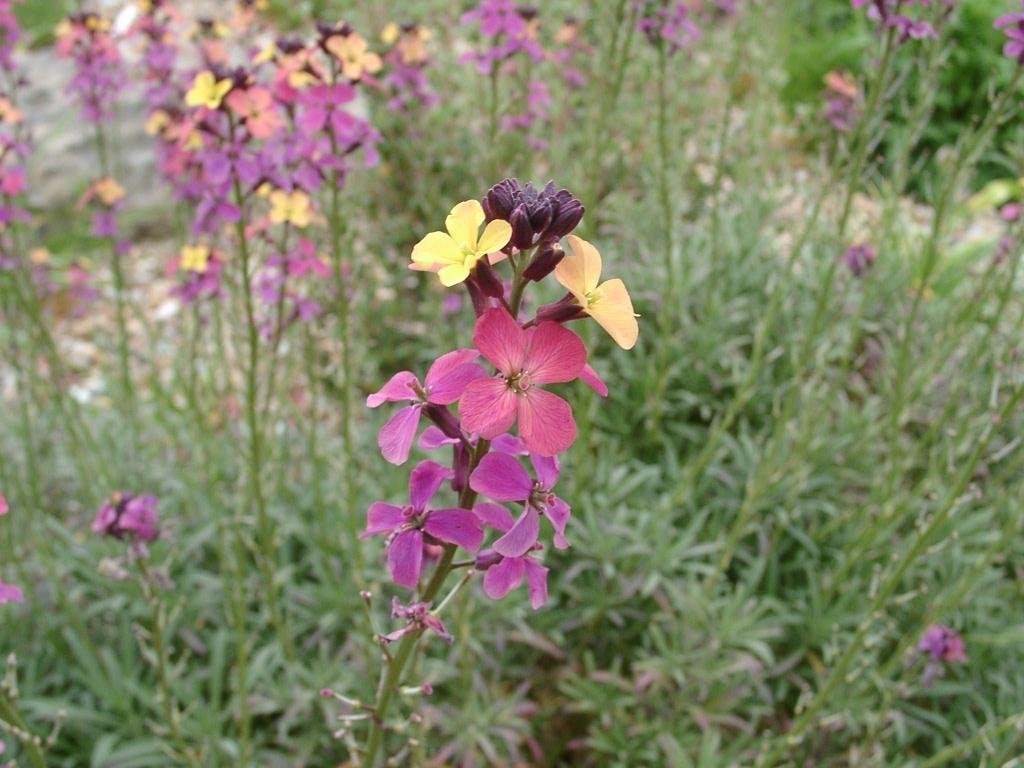
- Species: Erysimum cheiri
- Cultivar: 'Chelsea Jacket'

Erysimum 'Chelsea Jacket' is a type of wallflower. It is a small, short-lived, perennial cultivar of Erysimum cheiri usually grown for its long-lasting and brightly coloured flowers.flowers. It is closely related to Cheiranthus. This plant has been given an RHS Award of Garden Merit. Normal height is about 30 cm, prostrate habit.

The plant flourishes in full sun and well-drained soil and is fairly hardy. It flowers continually from late spring to late summer. Flowers start off yellow then fade through tangerine to purple, often with a succession of colours on the same flower head. Some claim that it can be seen changing colors from day to day.
