= Erysimum nervosum =

Scientific classification
- Kingdom: Plantae
- Clade: Tracheophytes
- Clade: Angiosperms
- Clade: Eudicots
- Clade: Rosids
- Order: Brassicales
- Family: Brassicaceae
- Genus: Erysimum
- Species: E. nervosum

Binomial name
- Erysimum nervosum (Pomel) Batt.

Synonyms
- Erysimum grandiflorum

Species of flowering plant

Erysimum nervosum (syn: Erysimum grandiflorum Desf. var. nervosum (Pomel) Batt.) is a short-lived, polycarpic perennial herb.

It is found in many montane regions of North Africa, including the Rif Mountains and Atlas Mountains in Morocco, the Tell Atlas in Algeria and the Ghar-Rouban mountains in Algeria and Tunisia.

Erysimum nervosum is distributed between 1000 and 3000 meters above sea level and inhabits forests, scrublands, and shrublands.

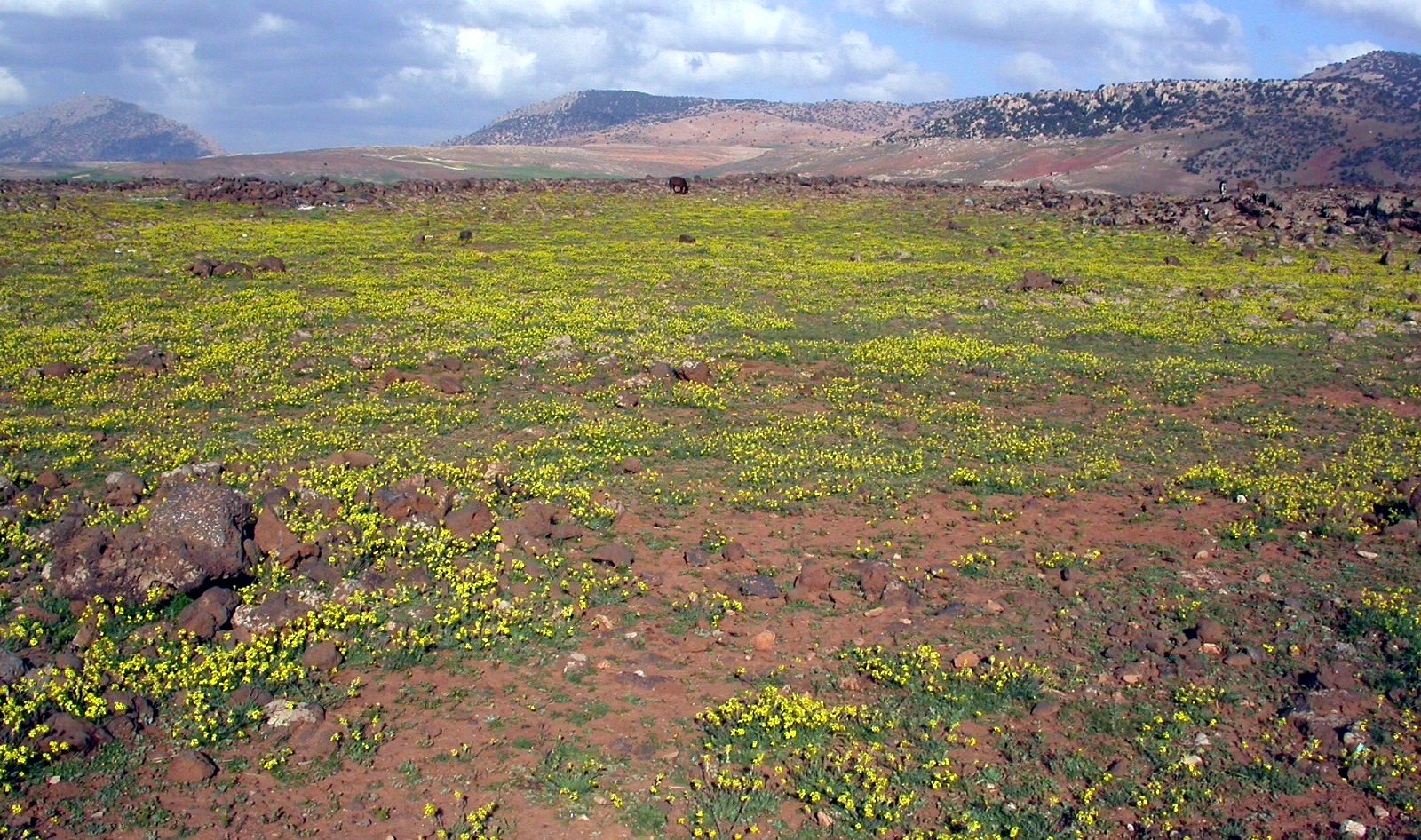
Erysimum nervosum population in the Atlas Mountains, Morocco.
