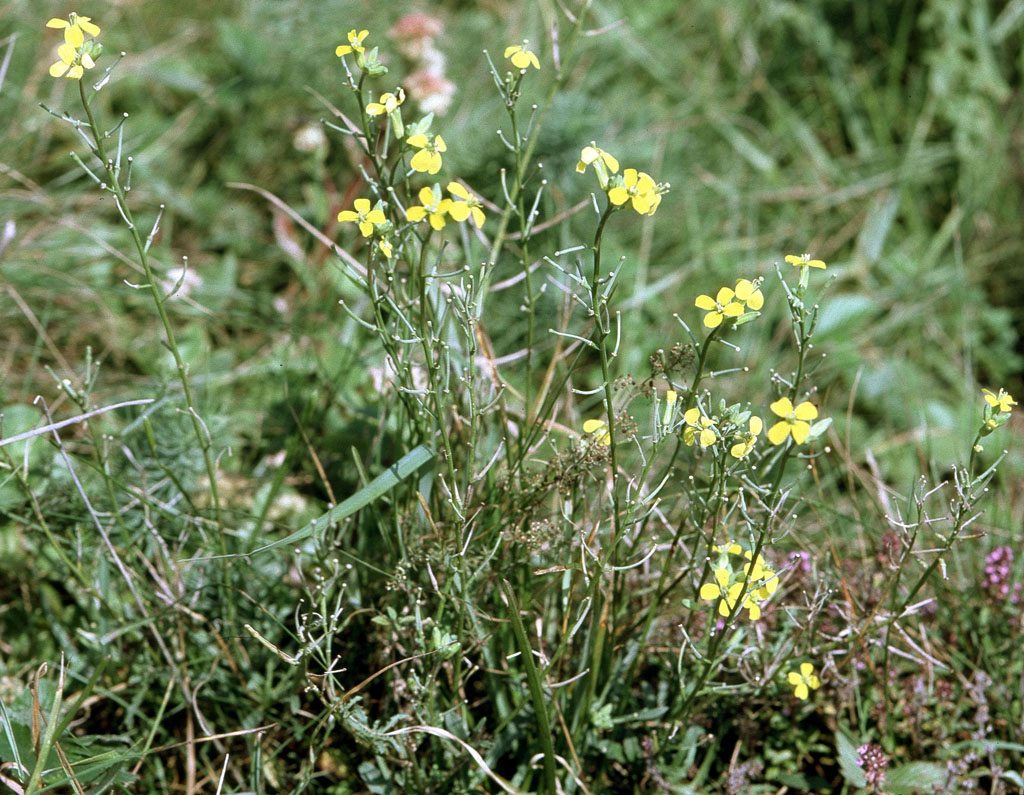

Scientific classification
- Kingdom: Plantae
- Clade: Tracheophytes
- Clade: Angiosperms
- Clade: Eudicots
- Clade: Rosids
- Order: Brassicales
- Family: Brassicaceae
- Genus: Erysimum
- Species: E. crepidifolium

Binomial name
- Erysimum crepidifolium Rchb.

= Erysimum crepidifolium =

Species of plant

Erysimum crepidifolium, the pale wallflower, is a plant species in the crucifer family, Brassicaceae. It is a member of the genus Erysimum, which includes between 150 and 350 species in the Northern Hemisphere.

== Description ==
Erysimum crepidifolium is an annual to short-lived perennial herbaceous plant that has upright stems, reaching a height of up to 60 cm. The leaves are hirsute, with margins ranging from dentate to entire.

Flowering occurs primarily from April until July. More rarely, E. crepidifolium plants also produce flowers in the fall.The odorless flowers are relatively large, reaching lengths of 9 to 15 mm. The four petals have a pale yellow color. There are six anthers. The 20 to 70 mm seed pods are gray-green, four-sided with rounded corners, and have 3 to 5 mm stems.

The species has a 2n = 14 chromosome number.

=== Similar species ===
E. crepidifolium is most easily confused with Erysimum odoratum Ehrh. (syn. Erysimum hieraciifolium L.), and with Erysimum marschallianum Andrz. ex DC. (E. marschallianum, itself, is cited by Malyschev and Peschkova as E. hieraciifolium) (Note: This, according to Plants of the Word Online, is done in their volume, Malyschev, L I; Peschkova, G A, eds. (2004). Flora of Siberia. Vol. 7. Enfield, Plymouth, New Hampshire: Scientific Publishers, Inc. ISBN 978-1-57808-106-6.) The latter, E. marschallianum, is differentiated primarily by the shape of the trichomes.

== Occurrence ==
Erysimum crepidifolium grows in dry meadows, preferring warm, rocky soils. The species occurs naturally from the Balkans and Italy to southern and central Germany. However, it is uncommon in Germany, where it is found most frequently in the middle Saale and Nahe river valleys. Other reported sites are in northern Bavaria and southwestern Germany. It is not native in Switzerland or Austria.

== Chemical toxicity ==
Like most members of the genus Erysimum, E. crepidifolium contains both cardiac glycosides (cardenolides), and glucosinolates.

All parts of E. crepidifolium are toxic due to their cardenolide content. There are at least 20 different cardenolides in the seeds, making up ~3.5% of the total mass. Among these, the most common are erysimoside (~2.3%) and its deglycosylated form helveticoside (0.5–1.2%). The highest concentrations of erysimoside and helveticoside are found during ripening and in drying seeds. Among 48 tested Erysimum species, E. crepidifolium had the highest cardenolide content in the leaves, at least three-fold higher than any of the other species.

Toxicity in humans has not been reported, though mass die-offs of geese are known. Consumption of E. crepidifolium by geese leads to muscle paralysis from which the animals eventually die (hence the German common name "Gänsesterbe", or geese death, for this species). Rabbits are also considered susceptible, but chickens are reportedly resistant to E. crepidifolium toxicity.

== Molecular biology ==
Due to its close phylogenetic relationship with the well-studied model plant species Arabidopsis thaliana, E. crepidifolium has been proposed as a suitable system for investigating the cardenolide biosynthetic pathway. Progesterone 5β-reductase, which was initially proposed as an enzyme of cardenolide biosynthesis in Digitalis, also has been cloned from E. crepidifolium. However, the natural substrate of this E. crepidifolium enzyme has not yet been identified. 3β-Hydroxysteroid dehydrogenases represent another enzyme class that is predicted to be involved in cardenolide biosynthesis. Comparison to A. thaliana genes identified three predicted 3β-hydroxysteroid dehydrogenases in E. crepidifolium (EcHSD1, EcHSD2, and EcHSD3). In vitro assays showed that all three enzymes catalyze the dehydrogenation of pregnenolone and the 3-reduction of 5-α/β-pregnane-3,20-dione. Whereas EcHSD1 expression was not induced by tested stress conditions, EcHSD2 expression was upregulated by osmotic stress, and EcHSD3 expression was upregulated by both osmotic stress and treatment with methyl jasmonate, an endogenous elicitor of chemical defenses in many plant species. Successful propagation of E. crepidifolium as shoot cultures allows the production of uniform plant material for in vitro assays. Expression of two progesterone 5β-reductase and three 3β-hydroxysteroid dehydrogenase genes was detected in shoot cultures.
