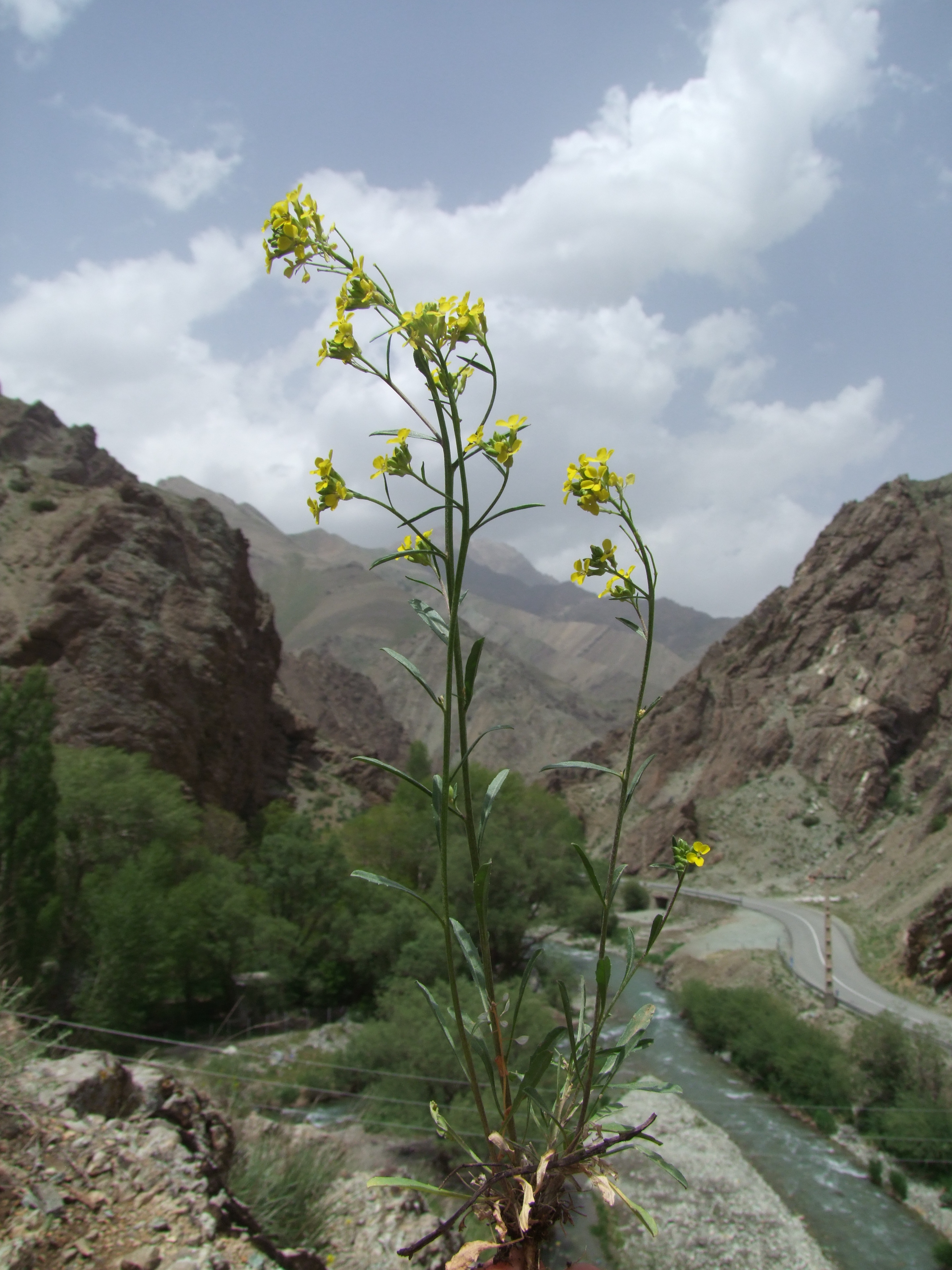

Scientific classification
- Kingdom: Plantae
- Clade: Tracheophytes
- Clade: Angiosperms
- Clade: Eudicots
- Clade: Rosids
- Order: Brassicales
- Family: Brassicaceae
- Genus: Erysimum
- Species: E. collinum

Binomial name
- Erysimum collinum (M.Bieb.) Andrz. ex DC.

= Erysimum collinum =

Species of plant

Erysimum collinum is a plant species in the family Brassicaceae. It is one of between 150 and 350 species of Erysimum in the Northern Hemisphere.

== Morphology ==
Erysimum collinum is a biennial species. Plants are typically branching at the base, with 1–7 stems at the time of flowering. Leaves (length 14–50 mm, width 2–11 mm) are covered in hairs and are narrower at the base. Flowers are yellow with glabrous petals 6–11 mm long and 2–4 mm wide. There are 30-60 flowers in the main raceme. Seed pods are 56–95 mm long, 1.3–2 mm wide, square with non-obvious edges, and aligned parallel to the flower stalk. Flower stalks are rounded and 500–820 mm tall at the time of seed set.

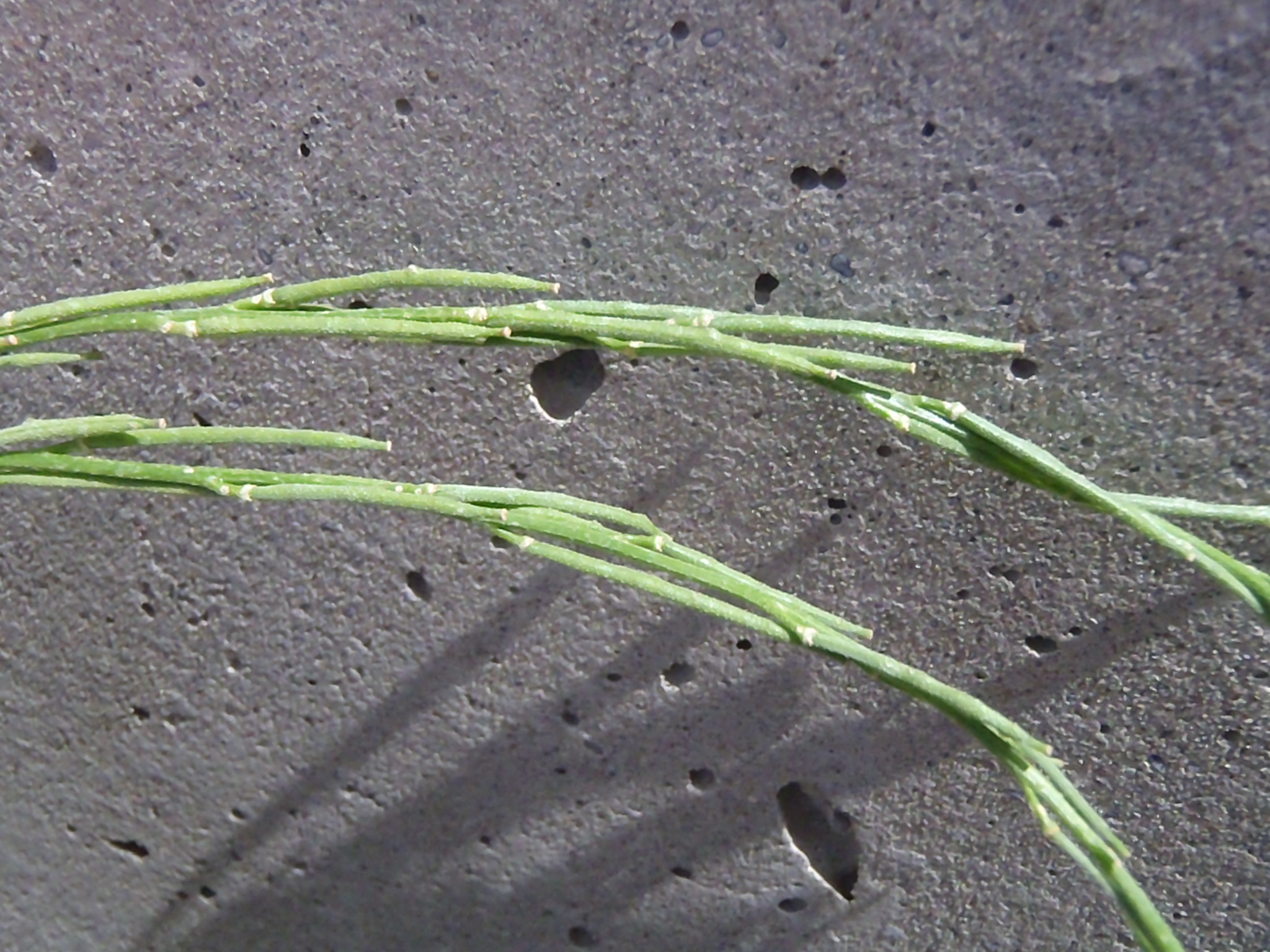
Immature Erysimum collinum seed pods

== Occurrence ==
Erysimum collinum is native to southeastern Russia, Armenia, Turkey, Georgia, Azerbaijan, Iraq, and Iran, where it grows at altitudes from 700 to 1390 m. Habitats where E. collinum is found include cultivated fields, river banks, and rocky areas.

== Taxonomy ==
In a 2014 taxonomic revision, E. aucherianum, E. gayanum, E. gracile, and E. passgalense are considered to be the same species as E. collinum. The revised species has both diploid (2n = 14) and hexaploid (2n = 42) members. Based on sequence comparisons of expressed genes in 48 Erysimum species, E. collinum is most closely related to E. crassipes and E. crassicaule.

== Chemical defenses ==
The genus Erysimum is known for containing two major classes of defensive metabolites: glucosinolates, which are characteristic of all Brassicaceae, and cardiac glycosides (cardenolides), which are found only within the genus Erysimum. However, unlike other analyzed members of the genus Erysimum, E. collinum contains only trace amounts of cardiac glycosides (cardenolides). Nevertheless, extracts of E. collinum showed some inhibitory activity of the mammalian sodium-potassium ATPase pump (Na^{+}/K^{+}-ATPase), the main molecular target of cardenolides.

The most abundant glucosinolate in E. collinum is glucoerypestrin (3-methoxycarbonylpropyl glucosinolate), which has been reported only within the genus Erysimum, including also in the species E. repandum (syn. E. pulchellum), E. odoratum, and E. ochroleucum. Other glucosinolates found in E. collinum are indol-3-ylmethyl glucosinolate, 4-methoxyindol-3-ylmethyl glucosinolate, 3-methylsulfinylpropyl glucosinolate, 2-methylpropyl glucosinolate, and n-methylbutyl glucosinolate.
