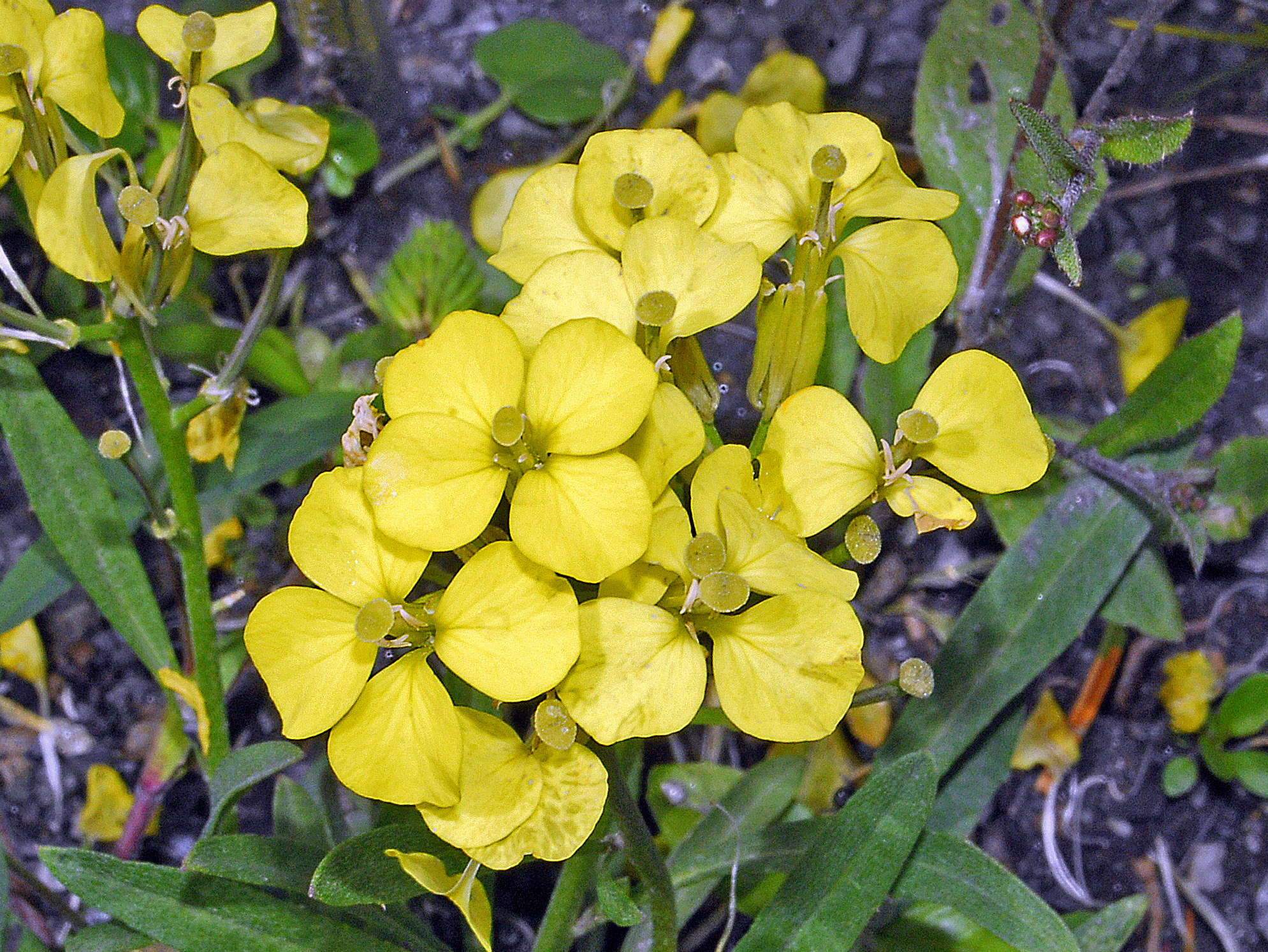
- Flowers of Erysimum jugicola at the Chanousia Alpine Botanical Garden

Scientific classification
- Kingdom: Plantae
- Clade: Tracheophytes
- Clade: Angiosperms
- Clade: Eudicots
- Clade: Rosids
- Order: Brassicales
- Family: Brassicaceae
- Genus: Erysimum
- Species: E. jugicola

Binomial name
- Erysimum jugicola Jord.

Synonyms
- Erysimum pumilum (Murith) Gaudin; Erysimum parvulum Jord.; Erysimum oreites Jord.; Cheiranthus pumilus Murith

= Erysimum jugicola =

Species of flowering plant

Erysimum jugicola is a plant of the family Brassicaceae.

== Distribution ==
Erysimum jugicola is a subendemism of the Western Alps.

== Habitat ==
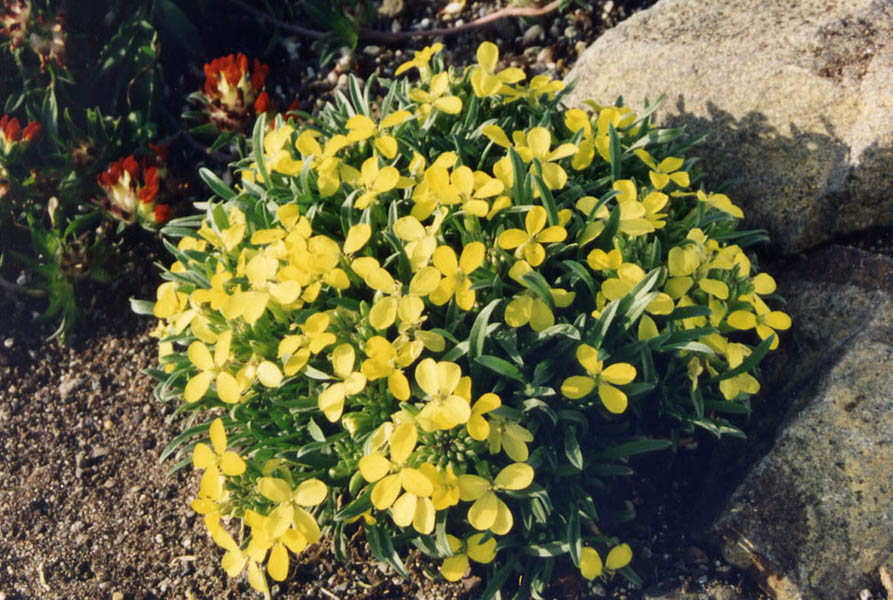
Plant of Erysimum jugicola

This species inhabits cliffs, dry meadows and stony pastures on limestones and serpentines at an elevation of 1,100–3,700 metres (3,600–12,100 ft) above sea level.

== Description ==
Erysimum jugicola can reach a height of about 5–25 centimetres (2.0–9.8 in). This perennial herb plant have an erect stem with alternate leaves, toothed, 2–5 millimetres (0.079–0.197 in) wide and 10–50 millimetres (0.39–1.97 in) long. Flowers are gathered in elongated inflorescences, with 5-17 weakly scented yellow flowers on peduncles 1.5–2.5 millimetres (0.059–0.098 in) long. They bloom from June to August.
