= Erysimum kykkoticum =

Conservation status
- Critically Endangered (IUCN 3.1)

Scientific classification
- Kingdom: Plantae
- Clade: Tracheophytes
- Clade: Angiosperms
- Clade: Eudicots
- Clade: Rosids
- Order: Brassicales
- Family: Brassicaceae
- Genus: Erysimum
- Species: E. kykkoticum

Binomial name
- Erysimum kykkoticum G.Hadjikyriakou & G.Alziar

Species of flowering plant

Erysimum kykkoticum is a species of flowering plant in the family Brassicaceae. It is endemic to the Mediterranean island of Cyprus, where it is found only in the Xeros River valley in the western Troodos Mountains. The species' range measures less than 3 hectares and its population is estimated to number less than 800 plants. Its natural habitats are Mediterranean-type shrubby vegetation and rocky areas. It is threatened by forest fires, drought, forestry, and road construction.

== Taxonomy ==
Erysimum kykkoticum is a rather basal species in its genus and is most closely related to a clade that includes Erysimum cheiri.

== Description ==
Compared to similar-looking Euphorbia and Matthiola species that grow in similar habitats, Erysimum kykkoticum has spoon-faced and rather large leaves.

== Distribution and habitat ==
The species is endemic to Cyprus, where it occupies an extremely small range spanning less than 3 hectares. It is only found in a locality called Argakin tou Pissokremmou in the Xeros River valley in the western Troodos Mountains. It grows in cracks in igneous rock or vertically on north- and east-facing banks along disused trails in forests. Its habitat is characterised by sheer cliffs and steep inclines and includes other plants such as Calabrian pine, golden oak, and shrubbery.

== Conservation ==
Erysimum kykkoticum is listed as being critically endangered on the IUCN Red List due to its very small range and small and declining population. The species' population is estimated to number less than 800 plants and is thought to be declining based on the data from two 1998 and 2004 surveys of the species. The species is majorly threatened by forest fires, Other, less serious threats include drought, forestry, and road-building.

Erysimum kykkoticum's entire range lies within the protected Paphos State Forest and the species is considered endangered in Cyprus. The Paphos State Forest is a candidate for Site of Community Importance status and is a proposed Special Protection Area under the Natura 2000 program.
