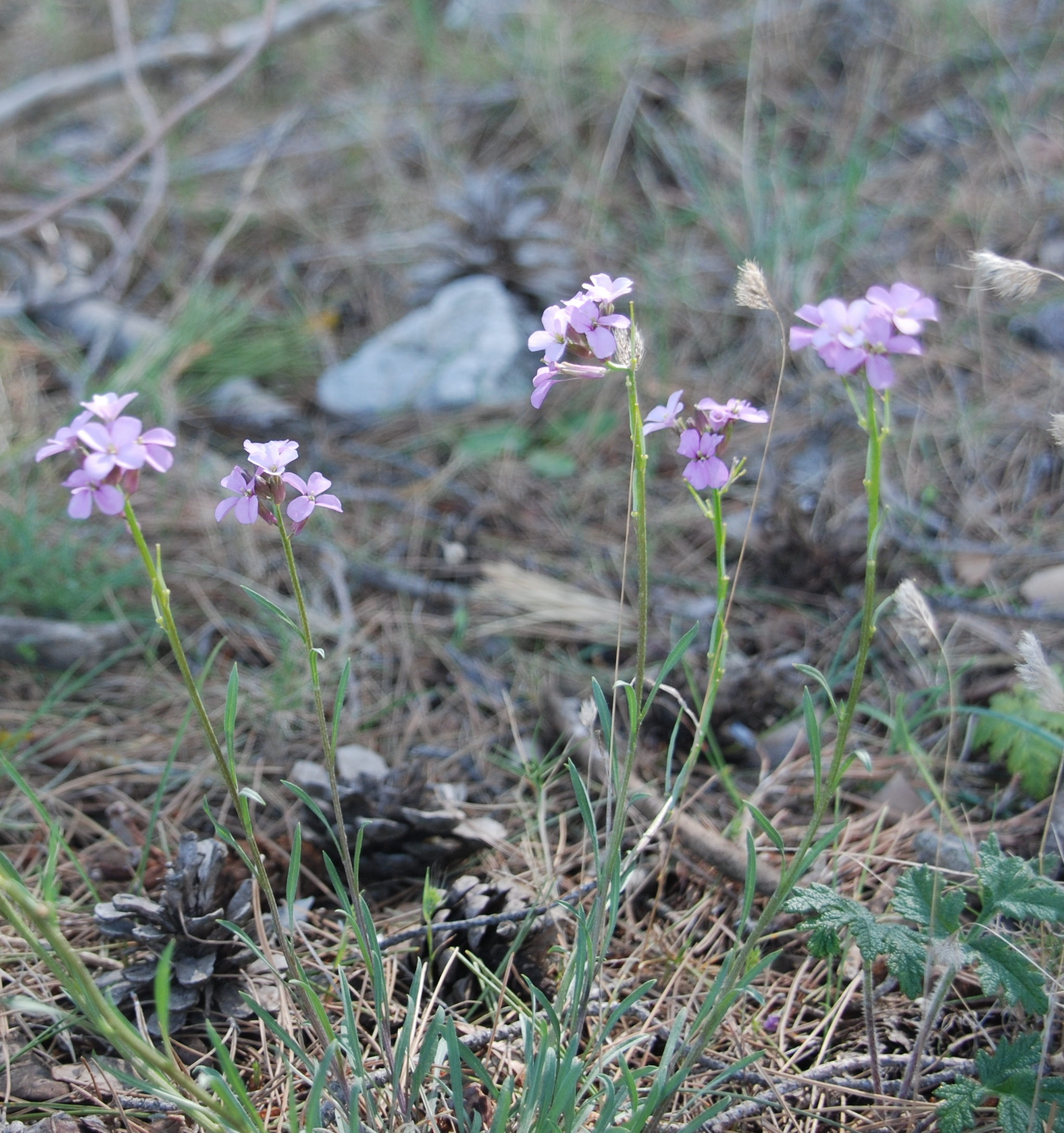

Scientific classification
- Kingdom: Plantae
- Clade: Tracheophytes
- Clade: Angiosperms
- Clade: Eudicots
- Clade: Rosids
- Order: Brassicales
- Family: Brassicaceae
- Genus: Erysimum
- Species: E. popovii

Binomial name
- Erysimum popovii Rothm., 1940

= Erysimum popovii =

Species of flowering plant

Erysimum popovii is a perennial short-lived herb endemic to several mountain ranges of southeastern Spain, in the Jaén, Granada and Córdoba provinces. This species was discovered in 1926 in Sierra Mágina (Jaén province) and it is included in the Red Book of Andalusian Plants, under the category of Insufficient Data (DD in Spanish). Some accepted synonyms are: Erysimum linifolium subsp. baeticum (Heywood 1954) and Erysimum linifolium sensu Willk., p. min. p.

== Life cycle and morphology ==
This wallflower is located between 900–1,700 m (3,000–5,600 ft) above sea level inhabiting oak forests, semi-arid scrublands and high-mountain shrublands.

This species is polycarpic, reproducing more than once during its life. During reproduction, it produces many purple flowers arranged in several flowering stalks. Plants are short - less than 50 cm (20 in) height in general.

== Pollination biology ==
Flowers are visited by many species of insects belonging to the order Hymenoptera, Diptera, Coleoptera, Lepidoptera and Heteroptera, outstanding species of Andrena (Andrenidae), Lasioglossum (Halictidae), Anthophora (Anthophoridae) and Bombylius (Bombyliidae).

Some ants, like Crematogaster scutellaris, rob nectar without pollinating the flowers.

Crematogaster scutellaris robbing nectar of E. popovii flower
