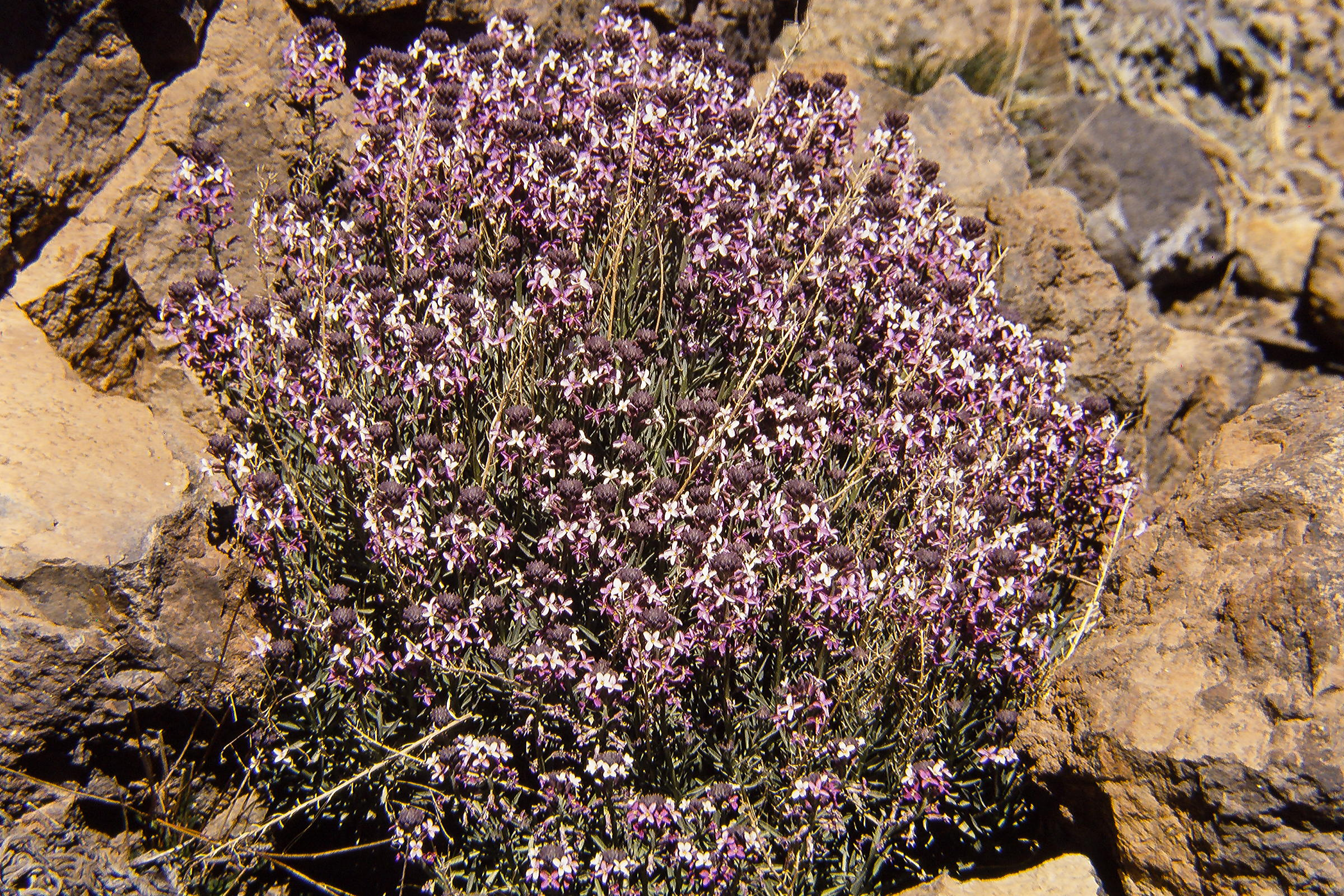
- In habitat, Las Cañadas, Tenerife

Scientific classification
- Kingdom: Plantae
- Clade: Tracheophytes
- Clade: Angiosperms
- Clade: Eudicots
- Clade: Rosids
- Order: Brassicales
- Family: Brassicaceae
- Genus: Erysimum
- Species: E. scoparium

Binomial name
- Erysimum scoparium (Brouss. ex Willd.) Wettst.

Synonyms
- Cheiranthus axillaris Brouss. ex Webb & Berthel.; Cheiranthus cinereus (Poir.) Webb & Berthel.; Cheiranthus cumbrae Link; Cheiranthus scoparius Brouss. ex Willd.; Dichroanthus cinereus (Poir.) Webb & Berthel.; Dichroanthus mutabilis var. albescens Webb & Berthel.; Dichroanthus scoparius (Brouss. ex Willd.) Webb & Berthel.; Erysimum albescens (Webb & Berthel.) Bramwell; Hesperis cinerea Poir.; Hesperis steveniana subsp. cinerea F.Dvorák

= Erysimum scoparium =

Species of flowering plant

Erysimum scoparium is a species of flowering plant in the family Brassicaceae, native to the Canary Islands. It is a shrubby species of wallflower with purplish flowers found at high altitudes.

== Description ==
Erysimum scoparium is a small shrubby perennial plant. It has stiff, linear to slightly pointed leaves. The flowers are arranged on upright stems. They darken to a purplish colour as they mature. The seed pods (siliquae) are held more or less erect and have brown seeds. A subspecies, E. scoparium subsp. cinereum has been distinguished by its more erect habit and longer inflorescences. Plants from Gran Canaria have broader leaves and dark brown rather than yellowish brown seeds, and have been separated as E. albescens by some sources.

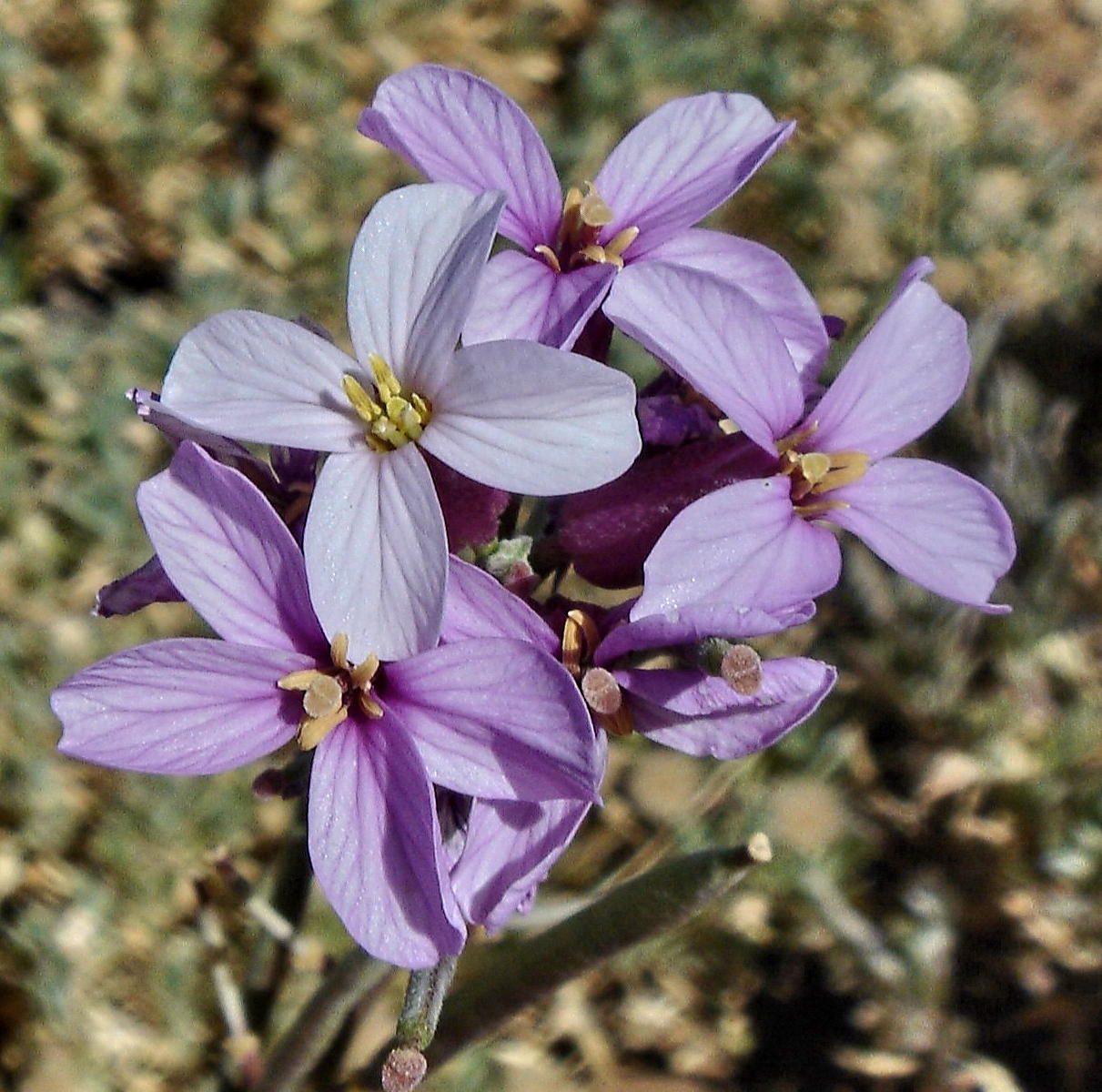
Flowers

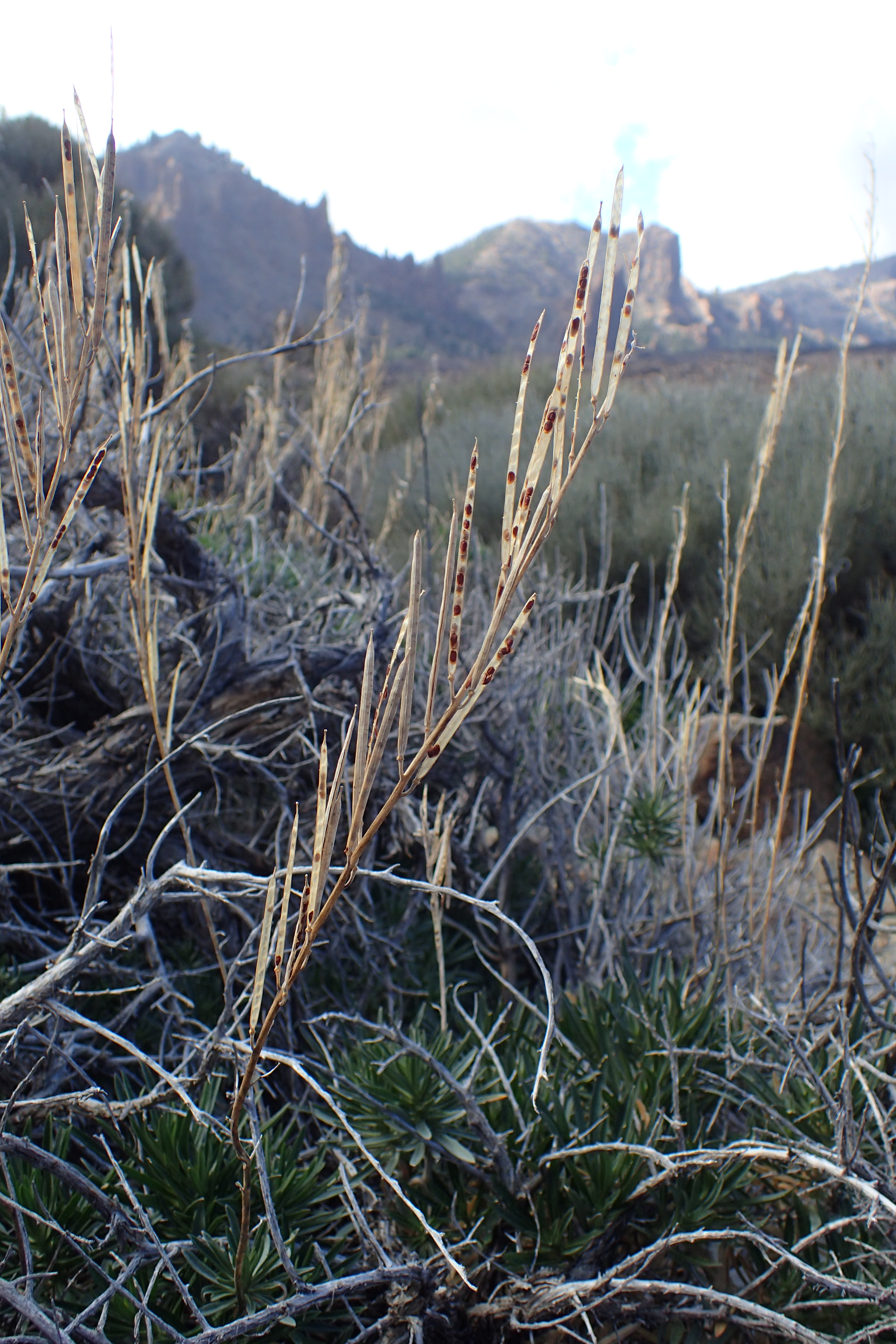
Seedpods

== Taxonomy ==
Erysimum scoparium was first described, as Cheiranthus scoparius, by Pierre Broussonet in 1809. It was transferred to the genus Erysimum by Richard Wettstein in 1889. Erysimum albescens has been distinguished from E. scoparium by some sources, but this is not accepted by others.

== Distribution and habitat ==
Erysimum scoparium is endemic to the Canary Islands. It is found in montane zones in Tenerife, up to altitudes of 1600–2200 m in Las Cañadas, and 300–500 m in the Valle del Santiado del Teide (subsp. cinereum). It is also found in mountainous regions of La Palma. When E. albescens is included in E. scoparium, the latter's distribution extends to Gran Canaria, where it is found in dry habitats and pine forest at elevations of 1400–1800 m.
