= Erysimum etnense =

Scientific classification
- Kingdom: Plantae
- Clade: Tracheophytes
- Clade: Angiosperms
- Clade: Eudicots
- Clade: Rosids
- Order: Brassicales
- Family: Brassicaceae
- Genus: Erysimum
- Species: E. etnense

Binomial name
- Erysimum etnense Jord.

Species of flowering plant

Erysimum etnense is a short-lived, polycarpic perennial herb endemic and found exclusively on Mount Etna, in Sicily, Italy. It grows from 1000 to 2000 metres above sea level and inhabits Genista aetnensis shrublands.
