= Erysimum =

- Erysimum scoparium

Scientific classification
- Kingdom: Plantae
- Clade: Embryophytes
- Clade: Tracheophytes
- Clade: Angiosperms
- Clade: Eudicots
- Clade: Rosids
- Order: Brassicales
- Family: Brassicaceae
- Genus: Erysimum; L.

Species
- Over 180, see text

Synonyms
- Cheiranthus L.; and others

Genus of flowering plants

Erysimum, or wallflower, is a genus of flowering plants in the cabbage family, Brassicaceae. It includes more than 150 species, both popular garden plants and many wild forms. Erysimum is characterised by star-shaped (and/or two-sided) trichomes growing from the stem, with yellow, red, pink or orange flowers and multiseeded seed pods.

== Morphology ==
Wallflowers are annuals, herbaceous perennials or sub-shrubs. The perennial species are short-lived and in cultivation treated as biennials. Most species have stems erect, with a covering of bifid hairs, usually 25 ± 53 cm × 2–3mm in size. The leaves are narrow and fixed. The lower leaves are broad and round with backwardly directed lobes, 50–80mm × 0.5–3mm. Stem leaves are linear, entire, growing whitish with 2-fid hairs; 21–43mm × 1.5–2mm. Flower clusters grow at intervals on short equal stalks along the stem, with bright yellow to red or pink bilateral flowers. Flowering occurs during spring and summer. One species, Erysimum semperflorens, native to Morocco and Algeria, has white flowers. The flowering part of the stem ranges from 4 to 7mm. There are four pouch-shaped sepals, light green, 5–7mm × 1.5–2mm.

== Etymology ==
The genus name Erysimum is derived from the Ancient Greek erysimon (ἐρύσιμον, Sisymbrium officinale or Sisymbrium polyceratium, the hedgenettle), itself from the word eryo (ἐρύω) meaning to drag or eryso, a form of rhyomai (ῥύομαι), meaning "to ward off" or "to heal" in reference to its medicinal properties.

The common name "wallflower" derives from the plant's ability to grow successfully in loose wall mortar.

== Distribution ==
Wallflowers are native to temperate Eurasia, North Africa and Macaronesia, and North America south to Costa Rica. Many wallflowers are endemic to small areas, such as:

- E. etnense (Mount Etna)
- E. franciscanum (north Californian coast)
- E. kykkoticum (Cyprus – nearly extinct)
- E. moranii (Guadalupe Island)
- E. nevadense (the Sierra Nevada of Spain)
- E. scoparium (the Teide volcano on Tenerife)
- E. teretifolium (endangered – inland sandhills of Santa Cruz County, California)

== Cultivation ==
Most wallflower garden cultivars (e.g. Erysimum 'Chelsea Jacket') are derived from E. cheiri (often placed in Cheiranthus), from southern Europe. They are often attacked by fungal and bacterial disease, so they are best grown as biennials and discarded after flowering. They are also susceptible to clubroot, a disease of Brassicaceae. Growth is best in dry soils with very good drainage, and they are often grown successfully in loose wall mortar. There is a wide range of flower color in the warm spectrum, including white, yellow, orange, red, pink, maroon, purple and russet. The flowers, appearing in spring, usually have a strong, pleasant fragrance. Wallflowers are often associated in spring bedding schemes with tulips and forget-me-nots.

The cultivar 'Bowles's Mauve' has gained the Royal Horticultural Society's Award of Garden Merit. It can become a bushy evergreen perennial in milder locations. It is strongly scented and attractive to bees.

== Ecology ==
Erysimum is found in a range of habitats across the northern hemisphere, and has developed diverse morphology and growth habits (herbaceous annual or perennial, and woody perennial). Different Erysimum species are used as food plants by the larvae of some Lepidoptera (butterflies and moths) species including the garden carpet (Xanthorhoe fluctuata). In addition, some species of weevils, like Ceutorhynchus chlorophanus, live inside the fruits feeding on the developing seeds. Many species of beetles, bugs and grasshoppers eat the leaves and stalks. Some mammalian herbivores, for example mule deer (Odocoileus hemionus) in North America, argali (Ovis ammon) in Mongolia, red deer (Cervus elaphus) in Central Europe, or Spanish ibex (Capra pyrenaica) in the Iberian Peninsula, feed on wallflower flowering and fruiting stalks. Erysimum crepidifolium (pale wallflower) is toxic to some generalist vertebrate herbivores.

Most wallflowers are pollinator-generalists, their flowers being visited by many different species of bees, bee flies, hoverflies, butterflies, beetles, and ants. However, there are some specialist species. For example, Erysimum scoparium is pollinated almost exclusively by Anthophora alluadii.

=== Defensive compounds ===
Like most Brassicaceae, species in the genus Erysimum produce glucosinolates as defensive compounds. However, unlike almost all other genera in the Brassicaceae, Erysimum also accumulates cardiac glycosides, another class of phytochemicals with an ecological importance in insect defense. Cardiac glycosides specifically function to prevent insect herbivory and/or oviposition by blocking ion channel function in muscle cells. These chemicals are toxic enough to deter generalist, and even some specialist insect herbivores. Cardiac glycoside production is widespread in Erysimum, with at least 48 species in the genus containing these compounds. Accumulation of cardiac glycosides in Erysimum crepidifolium, but not other tested species, is induced by treatment with jasmonic acid and methyl jasmonate, endogenous elicitors of chemical defenses in many plant species. Molecular phylogenetic analysis indicates that Erysimum diversification from other Brassicaceae species that do not produce cardiac glycosides began in the Pliocene (2.33–5.2 million years ago), suggesting relatively recent evolution of cardiac glycosides as a defensive trait in this genus.

=== Escape from herbivory ===
The evolution of novel chemical defenses in plants, such as cardenolides in the genus Erysimum, is predicted to allow escape from herbivory by specialist herbivores and expansion into new ecological niches. The crucifer-feeding specialist Pieries rapae (white cabbage butterfly) is deterred from feeding and oviposition by cardenolides in Erysimum cheiranthoides. Similarly, Anthocharis cardamines (orange tip butterfly), which oviposits on almost all crucifer species, avoids E. cheiranthoides. Erysimum asperum (western wallflower) is resistant to feeding and oviposition of Pieris napi macdunnoughii (synonym Pieris marginalis, margined white butterfly). Two crucifer-feeding beetles, Phaedon sp. and Phyllotreta sp., were deterred from feeding by cardenolides that were applied to their preferred food plants. Consistent with the hypothesis of enhanced speciation after escape from herbivory, phylogenetic studies involving 128 Erysimum species indicate diversification in Eurasia between 0.5 and 2 million years ago, and in North America between 0.7 and 1.65 million years ago.) This evolutionarily rapid expansion of the Erysimum genus has resulted in several hundred known species distributed throughout the northern hemisphere.

== Ethnobotanical uses of Erysimum ==
Erysimum species have a long history of use in traditional medicine. In Naturalis Historia by Pliny the Elder (c. 77), Erysimum is classified as a medicinal rather than a food plant. Erysimum cheiri is described as a medicinal herb in De Materia Medica by Pedanius Dioscorides (c. 70), which was the predominant European medical pharmacopeia for more than 1,500 years. Other medieval descriptions of medicinal herbs and their uses, including the Dispensatorium des Cordus by Valerius Cordus (1542), Bocks Kräuterbuch by Hieronymus Bock (1577), and Tabernaemontanus' Neuw Kreuterbuch by Jacobus Theodorus Tabernaemontanus (1588), also discuss applications of E. cheiri. In traditional Chinese medicine, Erysimum cheiranthoides has been used to treat heart disease and other ailments. Although medical uses of Erysimum became uncommon in Europe after the Middle Ages, Erysimum diffusum, as well as purified erysimin and erysimoside, have been applied more recently as Ukrainian ethnobotanical treatments.

== Selected species ==
- Erysimum allionii – Siberian wallflower
- Erysimum amasianum – Turkish wallflower
- Erysimum ammophilum
- Erysimum angustatum – Dawson wallflower
- Erysimum arenicola – cascade wallflower
- Erysimum baeticum
- Erysimum caboverdeanum – Cabo Verde wallflower
- Erysimum capitatum – sanddune wallflower, western wallflower
- Erysimum cazorlense, syn. Erysimum myriophyllum subsp. cazorlense
- Erysimum cheiranthoides – wormseed wallflower
- Erysimum × cheiri – wallflower
- Erysimum collinum
- Erysimum crepidifolium – pale wallflower
- Erysimum creticum – Crete wallflower
- Erysimum diffusum – diffuse wallflower
- Erysimum etnense – Mount Etna wallflower
- Erysimum franciscanum – Franciscan wallflower
- Erysimum fitzii
- Erysimum gomez-campoi
- Erysimum hedgeanum – syn. Arabidopsis erysimoides
- Erysimum inconspicuum – smallflower prairie wallflower
- Erysimum insulare
- Erysimum jugicola
- Erysimum kotschyanum – Kotschy wallflower
- Erysimum kykkoticum
- Erysimum mediohispanicum, syn. Erysimum nevadense subsp. mediohispanicum
- Erysimum menziesii
- Erysimum myriophyllum
- Erysimum nervosum
- Erysimum nevadense – Sierra Nevada wallflower
- Erysimum odoratum – smelly wallflower (syn. Erysimum pannonicum)
- Erysimum popovii
- Erysimum raulinii – Crete wallflower
- Erysimum redowskii, syn. Erysimum pallasii – Pallas' wallflower
- Erysimum repandum
- Erysimum rhaeticum – Swiss wallflower
- Erysimum scoparium – Teide wallflower
- Erysimum siliculosum
- Erysimum teretifolium – Santa Cruz wallflower, Ben Lomond wallflower

== Gallery ==
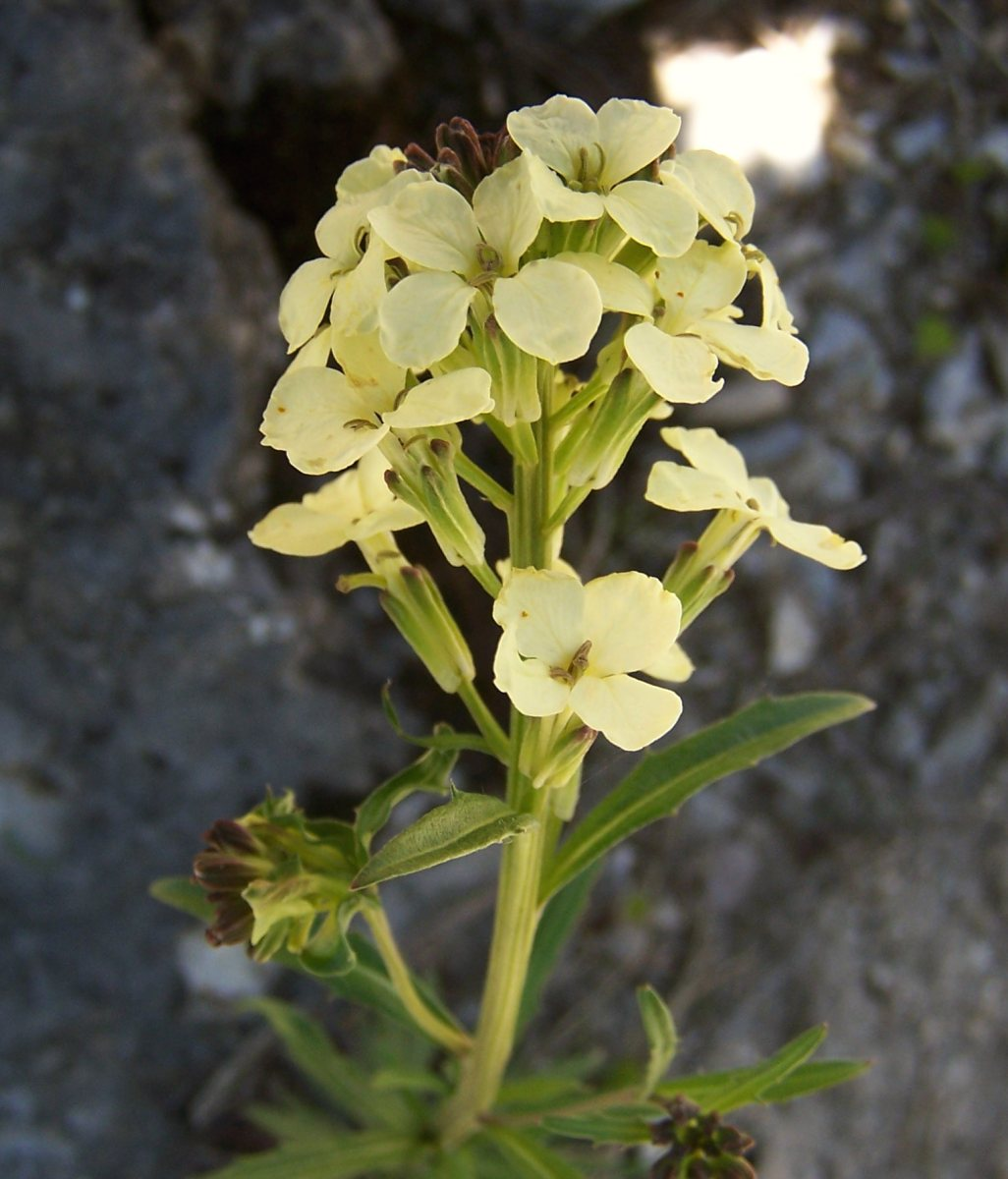
Erysimum witmanii inflorescence

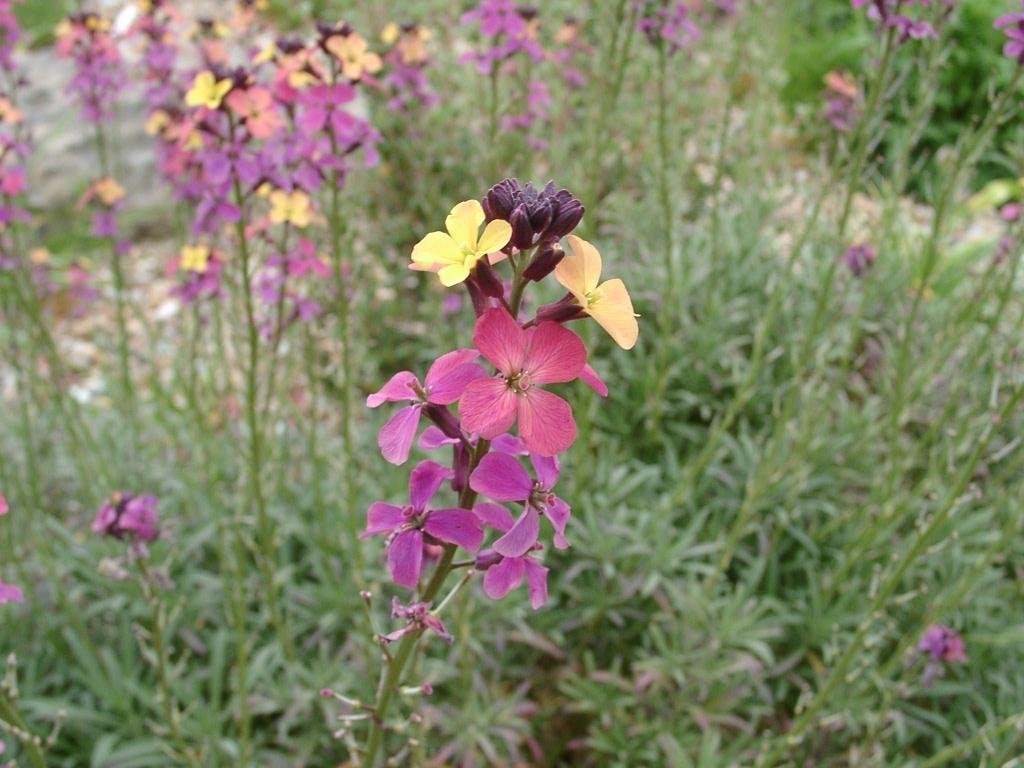
Erysimum 'Chelsea Jacket'

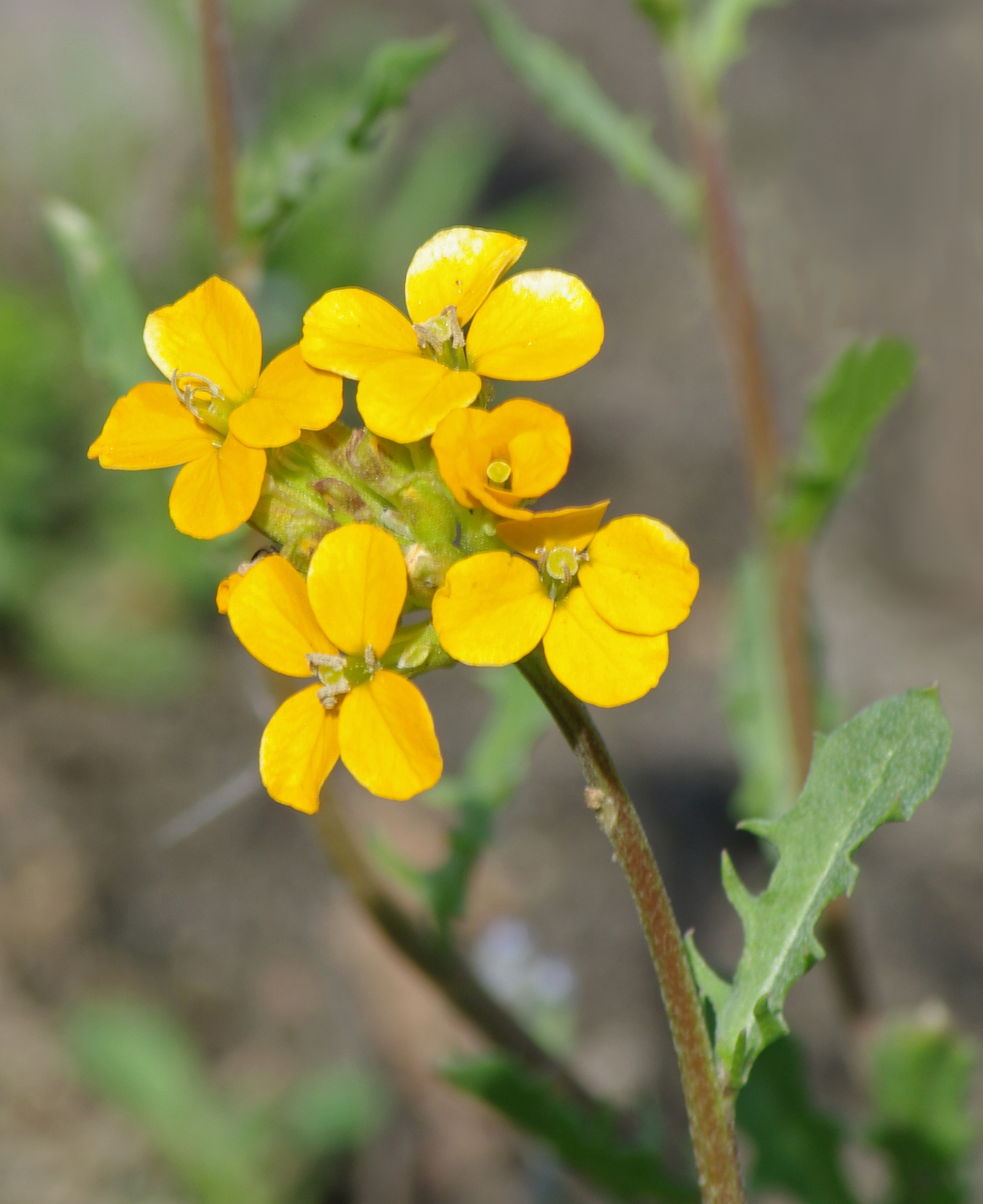
Erysimum helveticum

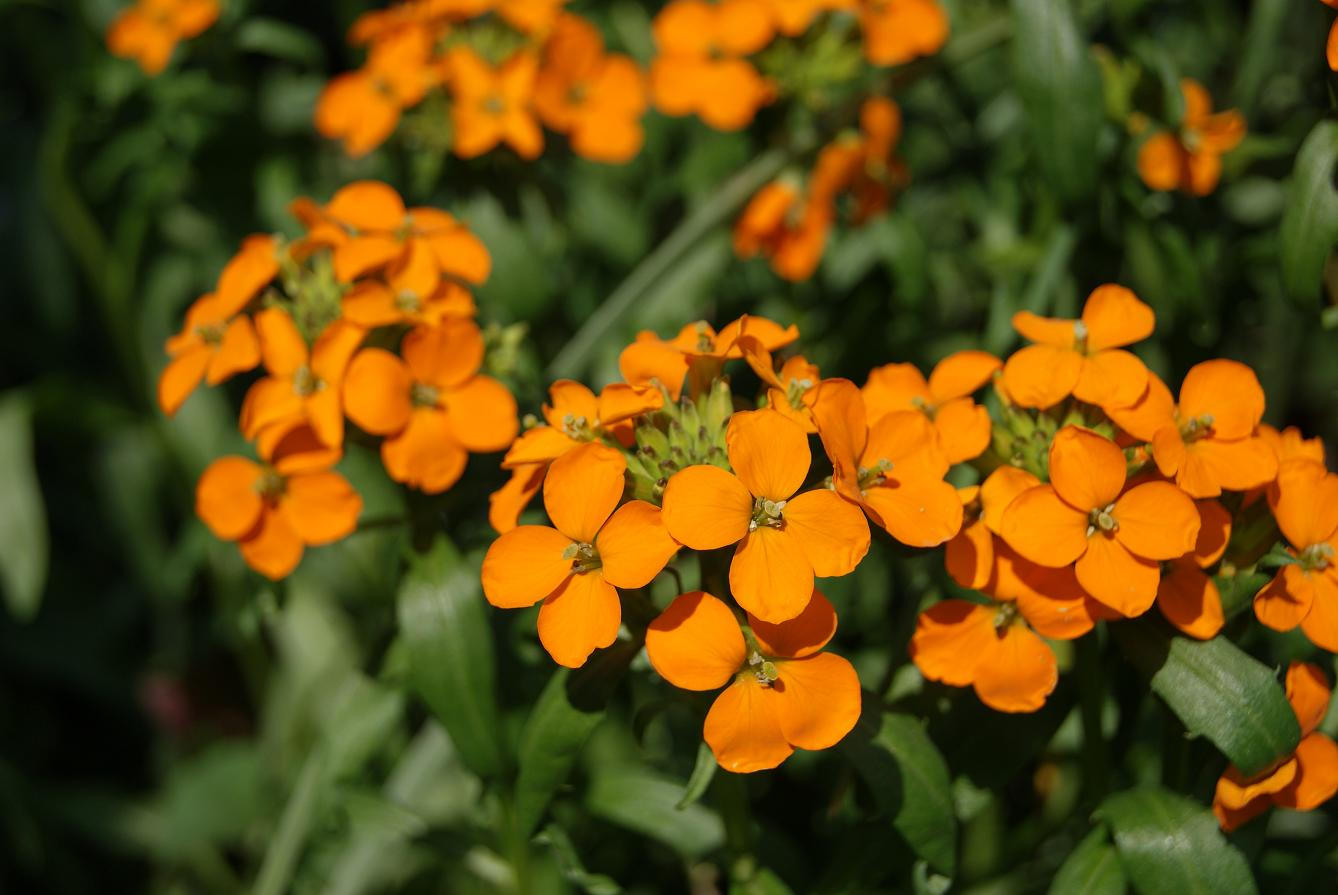
Erysimum allionii inflorescence

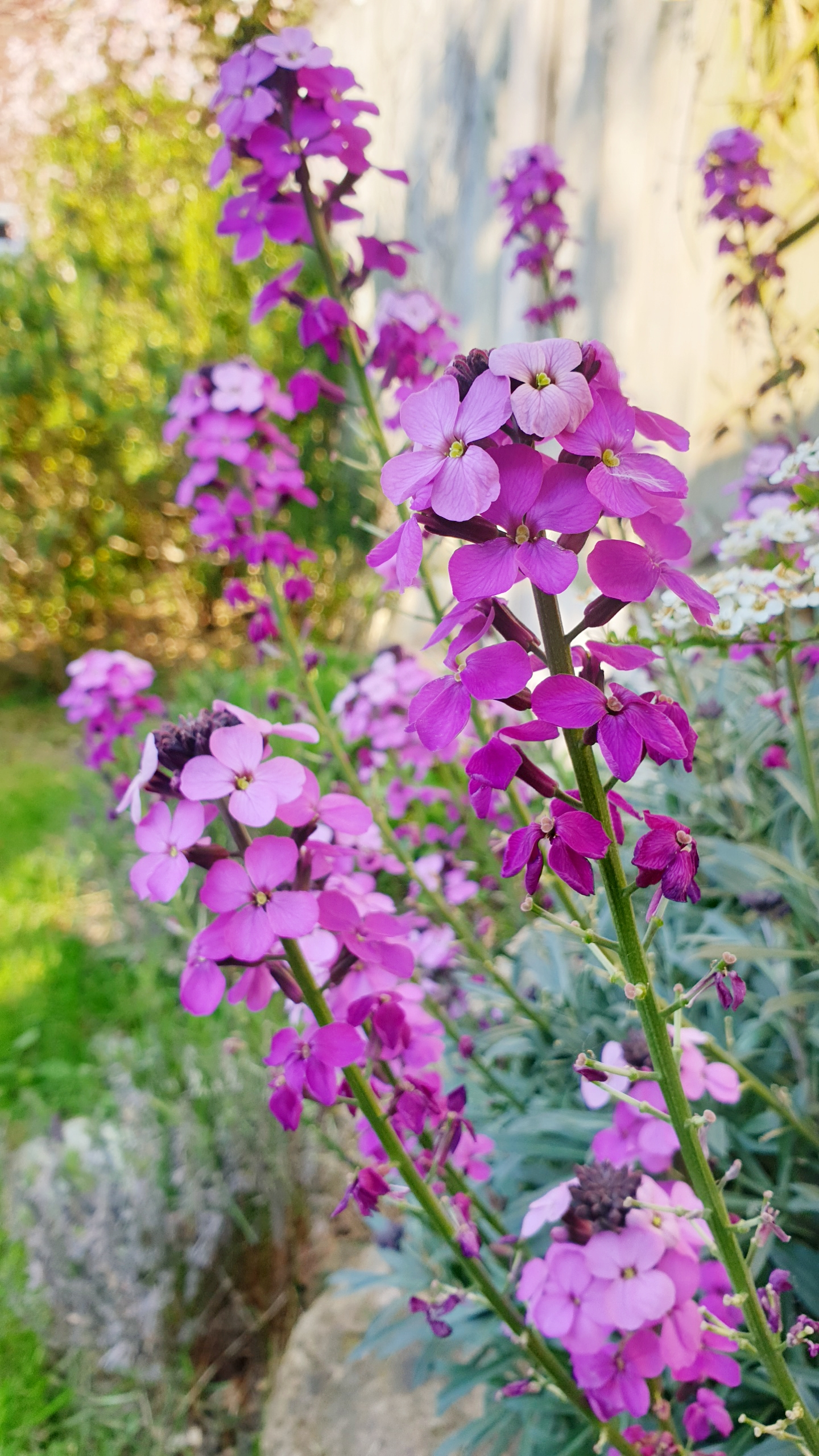
Erysimum × linifolium 'Bowles's Mauve'

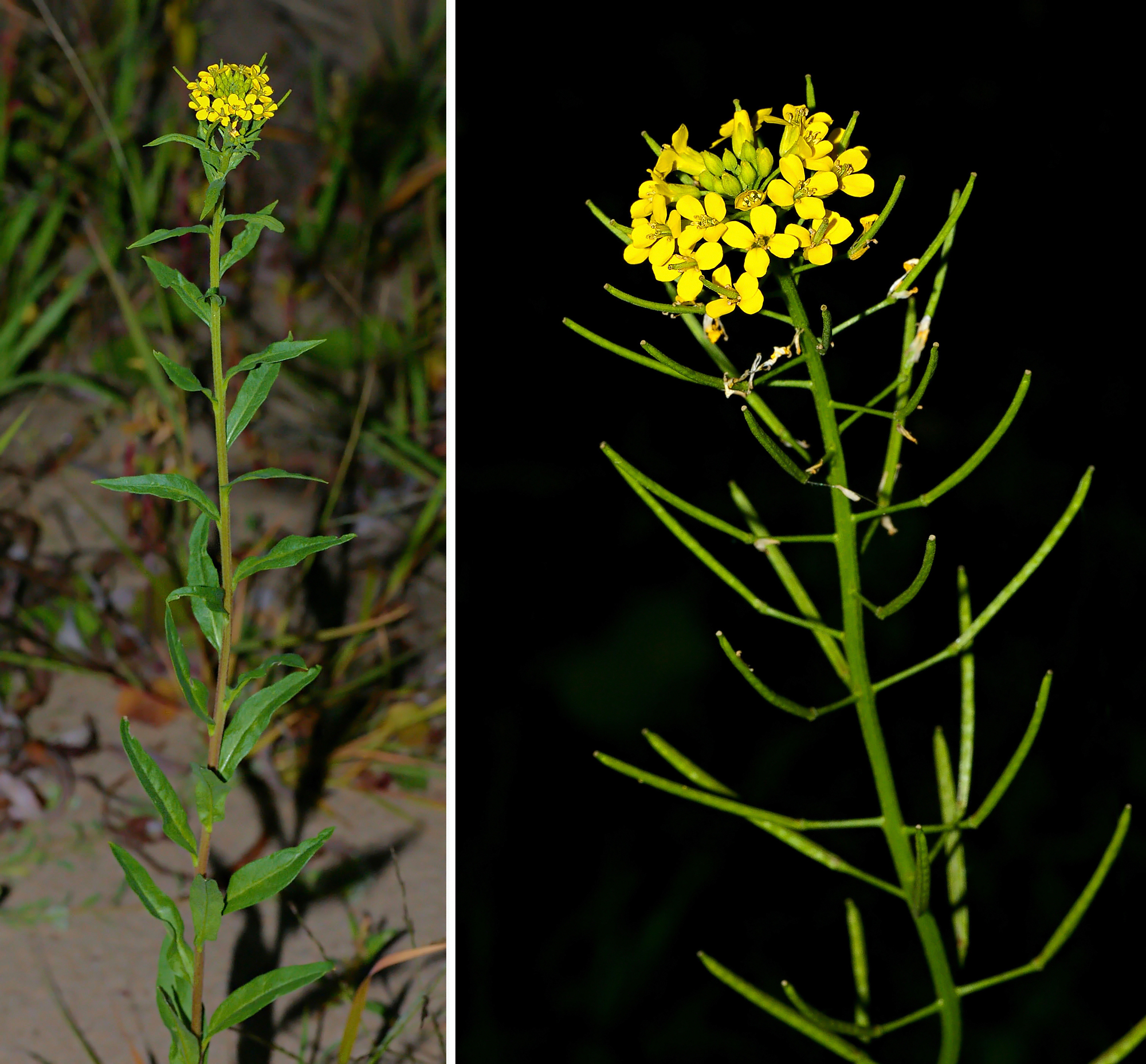
Erysimum cheiranthoides
