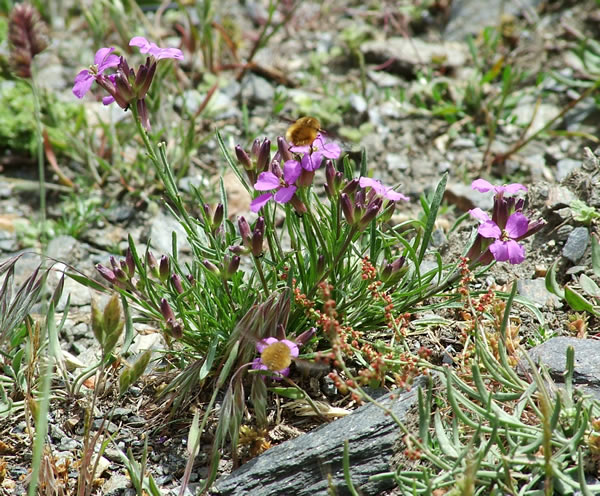
- Erysimum baeticum subsp. baeticum

Scientific classification
- Kingdom: Plantae
- Clade: Tracheophytes
- Clade: Angiosperms
- Clade: Eudicots
- Clade: Rosids
- Order: Brassicales
- Family: Brassicaceae
- Genus: Erysimum
- Species: E. baeticum

Binomial name
- Erysimum baeticum (Heyw.) A.Polatschek, 1979

= Erysimum baeticum =

Species of flowering plant

Erysimum baeticum is an annual to perennial herb endemic to some mountains in the SE of Spain. This species has two subspecies: Erysimum baeticum bastetanum is found only in the Sierra de Baza (Granada province), inhabiting the subalpine pine forests, from 1500 to 2000 m. a.s.l.. Erysimum baeticum baeticum is a subspecies endemic to the eastern range of the Sierra Nevada (Almería province), inhabiting subalpine shrublands. Both subspecies flower during late May through early July, displaying up to one hundred showy purple flowers arranged in several short stalks.

== Life cycle ==
Plants germinate during early spring (March to early May), and usually grow for 2–3 years as vegetative rosettes. Much mortality occurs at this stage due to summer drought. Surviving individuals flower during their second year. Erysimum baeticum bastetanum is monocarpic, most individuals dying after flowering. Erysimum baeticum baeticum is mostly polycarpic, since an important proportion of individuals reproduce more than once.

== Morphology ==
Reproductive plants produce one to eight reproductive stalks. Each flowering stalk can display between 5 and more than one hundred bright purple, hermaphroditic, slightly protandrous flowers arranged in corymbous inflorescences. Flowering stalks are tall (circa 1 m tall) in E. baeticum bastetatum, and very short (around 20 cm tall) in Erysimum baeticum baeticum. Flowers produce minute amount of nectar in four nectaries. Flower shape is extremely variable, ranging from radially to bilaterally symmetric even in the same population.

== Pollination biology ==
Information of pollination biology exists only for Erysimum baeticum baeticum. Flowers are visited by over 50 species of insects belonging to the order Hymenoptera, Diptera, Coleoptera, Lepidoptera and Heteroptera. Abundant pollinators are the beetles Meligethes maurus (Nitidulidae), Dasytes subaeneus (Dasytinae), and Malachius laticollis (Malachiinae), the solitary bees Anthophora leucophaea (Apidae) and Colletes sp (Colletidae), and the ants Proformica longiseta, Lasius niger and Cataglyphis velox (Formicidae). However, ants can act both as true pollinators and as nectar robbers.

== Herbivory ==
In southeastern Spain, reproductive individuals are consumed by many different species of herbivores, although more information is required. Some floral buds do not open because they are galled by flies (Dasineura sp., Cecidomyiidae). Several species of sap-suckers (primarily the bugs Eurydema oleracea, E. fieberi, E. ornata, and Corimeris denticulatus) feed on the reproductive stalks during flowering and fruiting. In addition, stalks are bored into by a weevil species (presumably Lixus ochraceus, Curculionidae), which consumes the inner tissues, whereas another weevil species ( presumably Ceutorhynchus, Curculionidae) develops inside the fruits, living on developing seeds and acting as predispersal seed predators. The stalks are browsed by Spanish ibex (Capra pyrenaica, Bovidae), which consume flowers and mostly green fruits. Dispersed seeds are consumed by woodmice (Apodemus sylvaticus, Muridae), several species of birds (Fringilla coelebs, Serinus serinus, and Carduelis cannabina Fringillidae, among others), several species of medium-sized granivorous beetles (Iberozabrus sp. Carabidae, among others), and ants (Lasius niger, Tetramorium caespitum, Cataglyphis velox and Leptothorax tristis). These animals feed on the seeds from late August to early April. Seedlings and juveniles are sometime injured by ibex, sheep, wild boars (Sus scrofa, Suidae), hares (Lepus granatense, Leporidae), and voles (Pitimys spp., Arvicolidae), although most seedlings die due to summer drought and seed quality.
