= Erysimum cazorlense =

Scientific classification
- Kingdom: Plantae
- Clade: Tracheophytes
- Clade: Angiosperms
- Clade: Eudicots
- Clade: Rosids
- Order: Brassicales
- Family: Brassicaceae
- Genus: Erysimum
- Species: E. cazorlense

Binomial name
- Erysimum cazorlense (Heywood) Holub

Synonyms
- Erysimum myriophyllum subsp. cazorlense (Heywood) Polatschek; Erysimum linifolium subsp. cazorlense Heywood

Species of flowering plant

Erysimum cazorlense is a short-lived, mostly monocarpic herb endemic to the Cazorla and Segura mountain ranges, SE Spain. Erysimum cazorlense may be treated as a distinct species or as Erysimum myriophyllum subsp. cazorlense.

It grows from 1500 to 2000 meters above sea level and inhabits Pinus nigra forests and high Mediterranean scrublands.
