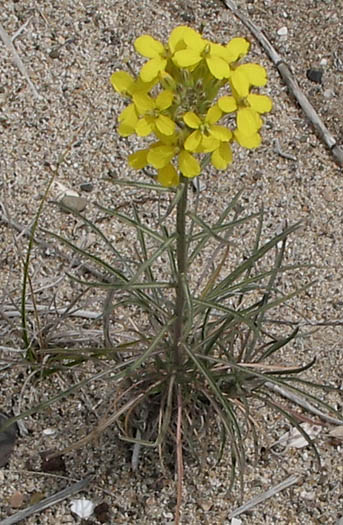
- subsp. suffrutescens

Scientific classification
- Kingdom: Plantae
- Clade: Tracheophytes
- Clade: Angiosperms
- Clade: Eudicots
- Clade: Rosids
- Order: Brassicales
- Family: Brassicaceae
- Genus: Erysimum
- Species: E. insulare

Binomial name
- Erysimum insulare Greene

= Erysimum insulare =

Species of flowering plant

Erysimum insulare is a species of Erysimum known by the common name island wallflower. It is endemic to coast of southern California, including the Channel Islands. Erysimum insulare grows on coastal bluffs and sand dunes.

== Description ==
Erysimum insulare is a perennial herb or subshrub producing a branching, erect stem 5 to 60 centimeters tall. It is lined with many hairy leaves which are linear to widely lance-shaped. The longest leaves near the base of the stem may be up to 15 centimeters long.

The top of the stem is occupied by a raceme inflorescence of many bright yellow to yellow-orange flowers. The fruit is a silique up to 10 centimeters long.

Subspecies

There are two subspecies of this plant:

- Erysimum insulare subsp. suffrutescens — most individuals belonging in this one.
- Erysimum insulare subsp. insulare — rare and limited to three of the northern Channel Islands in Channel Islands National Park.
