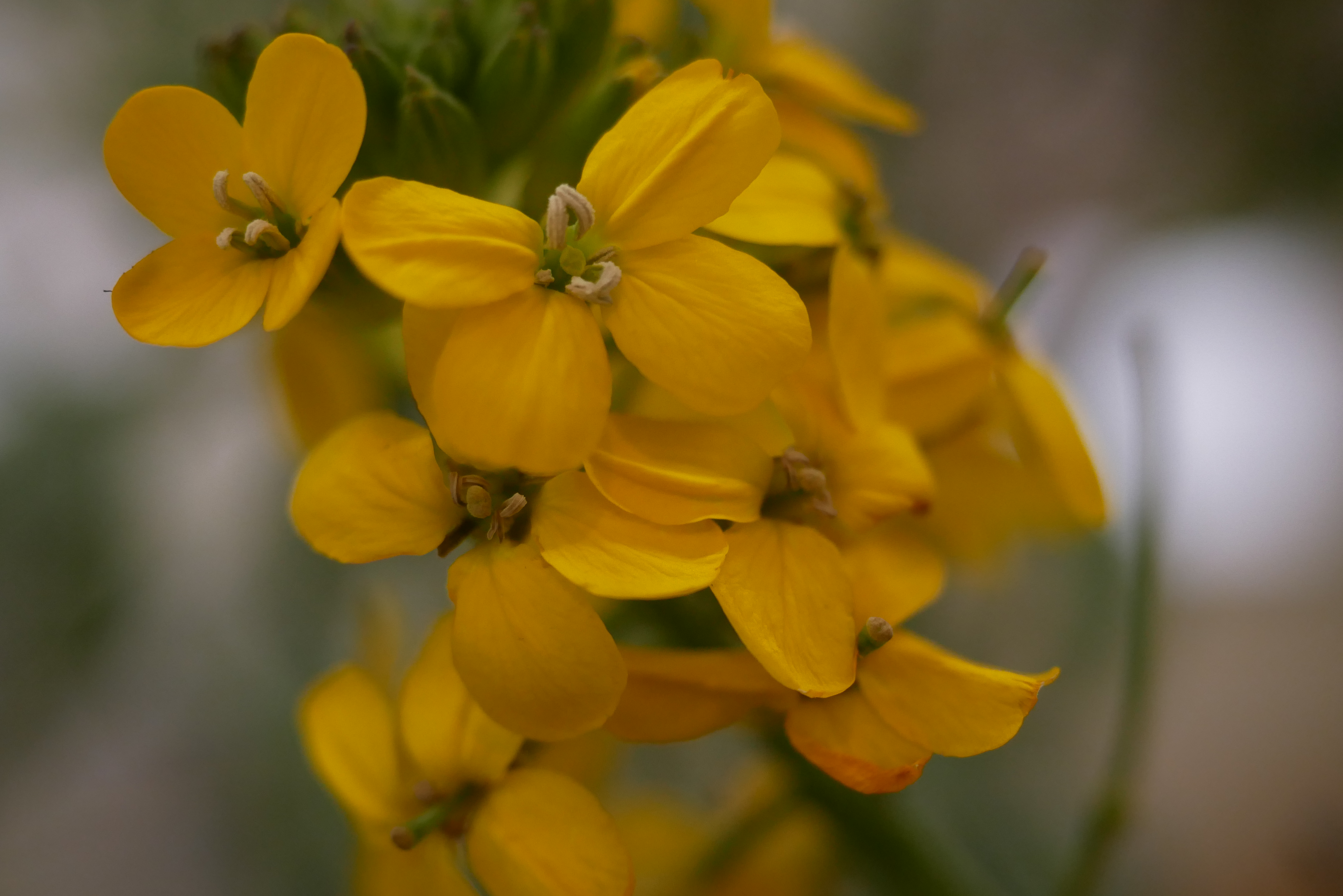

Conservation status
- Imperiled (NatureServe)

Scientific classification
- Kingdom: Plantae
- Clade: Tracheophytes
- Clade: Angiosperms
- Clade: Eudicots
- Clade: Rosids
- Order: Brassicales
- Family: Brassicaceae
- Genus: Erysimum
- Species: E. ammophilum

Binomial name
- Erysimum ammophilum A.Heller

Synonyms
- Cheiranthus ammophilus; Cheirinia ammophila

= Erysimum ammophilum =

Plant species in the cabbage family

Erysimum ammophilum is a species of wallflower known by the common name coast wallflower.

It only grows in California, where it is an uncommon beach-dwelling wildflower. It is known from dunes and bluffs near Monterey Bay, the coastline of San Diego County, and parts of the Channel Islands.

== Description ==
Erysimum ammophilum is a biennial or perennial plant varying in size from a few centimeters to over half a meter in height. It starts from a patch of long, narrow dark green leaves and produces one to several erect stems lined with similar leaves.

Atop the stem is an array of bright yellow flowers, each with four rounded petals. As the stem grows the flowers drop away to leave developing fruits, which are narrow siliques 2 to 12 centimeters long sticking out from the stem. The fruits contain winged seeds.

== Taxonomy ==
Erysimum ammophilum was scientifically described and named in 1904 by Amos Arthur Heller. It is classified in the Erysimum genus in the Brassicaceae family. The species has two synonyms. One from 1912 resulted from Heller proposing that it be reclassified into Cheirinia, a genus considered a synonym of Erysimum. The second is a name, Cheiranthus ammophilus, was also published in the same 1904 paper where he described the species.

== Range ==
The coast wallflower is endemic to the state of California where it grows in the northern Channel Islands of San Miguel Island and Santa Rosa Island in Santa Barbara County. On the mainland it grows along the central coast around Monterey Bay. The Natural Resources Conservation Service reports it in Monterey, Santa Cruz, and San Mateo counties. Plants that resembled coast wallflowers were formerly found in coastal Southern California.
