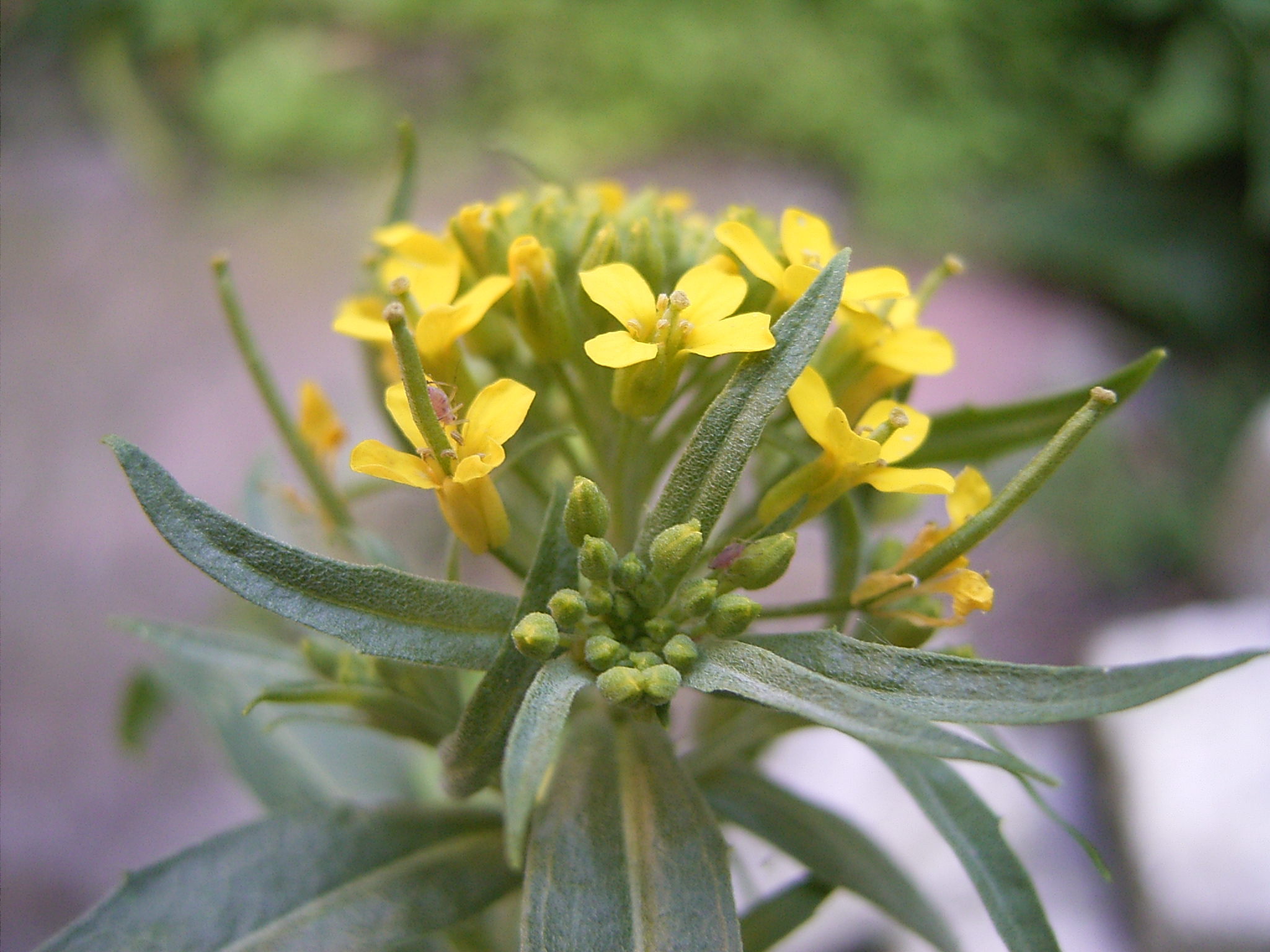

Conservation status
- Secure (NatureServe)

Scientific classification
- Kingdom: Plantae
- Clade: Embryophytes
- Clade: Tracheophytes
- Clade: Angiosperms
- Clade: Eudicots
- Clade: Rosids
- Order: Brassicales
- Family: Brassicaceae
- Genus: Erysimum
- Species: E. cheiranthoides

Binomial name
- Erysimum cheiranthoides L.

Synonyms
- Cheirinia cheiranthoides

= Erysimum cheiranthoides =

Species of flowering plant

Erysimum cheiranthoides, the treacle-mustard, wormseed wallflower, or wormseed mustard is a species of Erysimum native to most of central and northern Europe and northern and central Asia. Like other Erysimum species, E. cheiranthoides accumulates two major classes of defensive chemicals: glucosinolates and cardiac glycosides.

== Description ==
It is a herbaceous, annual plant similar in appearance to many other mustards, growing an erect stem 15–100 cm (5.9–39.4 in), (rarely 150 cm) tall. The leaves are lanceolate to elliptic, 2–11 cm long and 0.5–1 cm broad, with an entire to coarsely toothed margin. It blooms in summer, between June and August. The flowers are bright yellow, 5–12 mm diameter, and produced in an erect inflorescence. Later, it produces a slender cylindrical capsule, 1–3 cm (rarely 5 cm) long, containing several small, pale brown or dark brown seeds.

== Taxonomy ==
It was formerly described by the Swedish botanist Carl Linnaeus in his seminal publication 'Species Plantarum' in 1753, on page 661.

It is commonly known as treacle-mustard, or wormseed wallflower. The treacle mustard name came from the Greek word 'theriaki' meaning antidote to poisonous bites as the plant was thought to have healing properties. The name 'wormseed wallflower' arose from the seeds of the plant being made into treacle, to treat intestinal worms in children.

== Distribution ==
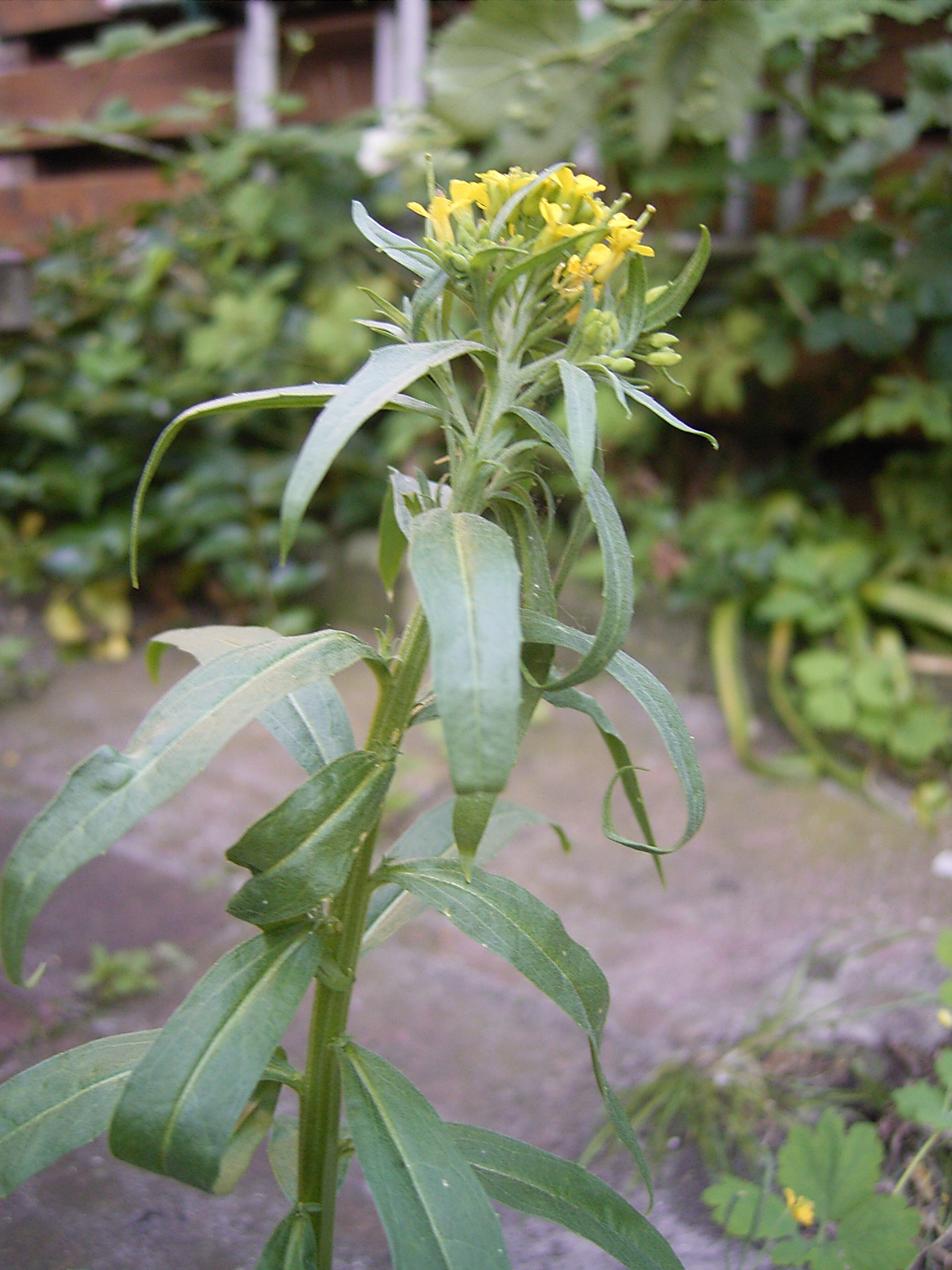
Erysimum cheiranthoides

Erysimum cheiranthoides is native to temperate areas of Europe and Asia.

=== Range ===
It is found in Asia within China (in the provinces of Heilongjiang, Jilin, Nei Monggol and Xinjiang), Japan, Korea, Mongolia and Siberia. In Eastern Europe, it is found in Belarus, Estonia, Latvia, Lithuania, Moldova and Ukraine. In middle Europe, it is found within Austria, Belgium, the Czech Republic, Germany, Hungary, the Netherlands, Poland, Slovakia and Switzerland. In Northern Europe, in Denmark, Finland, Norway, Sweden and the United Kingdom. In Southeastern Europe, within Bosnia and Herzegovina, Bulgaria, Croatia, France, Romania, Serbia and Slovenia.

It is also widely naturalised outside of its native range, from New Zealand, other parts of Europe, to North America (including parts of Canada), and Argentina (in Tierra del Fuego).

== Habitat ==
It grows in disturbed areas, fields, and dry stream beds. It is normally found at altitudes of 0–3,000 m (0–9,843 ft) above sea level.

== Chemical ecology ==
Like other members of the genus Erysimum, E. cheiranthoides produces two major classes of chemical defenses against herbivory: glucosinolates, which are characteristic of the plant family Brassicaceae, and cardiac glycosides (cardenolides), a class of chemicals produced by at least twelve different plant families. Glucosinolates found in E. cheiranthoides include glucoiberin, glucoerucin, glucocheirolin, and glucoiberverin. Cardenolides reported in E. cheiranthoides seeds include strophanthidin, digitoxigenin, cannogenol, erychroside, erysimoside, erycordin, cheiranthoside, glucoerysimoside, and glucodigifucoside. Grafting experiments and genetic crosses indicate that cardenolides are produced in the leaves of E. cheiranthoides and are transported to other parts of the plant.

Some crucifer-specialist insect herbivores do not feed and/or oviposit readily on E. cheiranthoides. Anthocharis cardamines (orange tip butterfly), which oviposits on almost all crucifer species, avoids E. cheiranthoides. Similarly, the crucifer-feeding specialist Pieries rapae (white cabbage butterfly) is deterred from feeding and oviposition on E. cheiranthoides. However, another pierid species, Pieris napi oleracea (green veined white butterfly), not only is less sensitive to exogenously added cardenolides than P. rapae in oviposition assays, but also oviposits more readily on E. cheiranthoides leaves.

In the case of P. rapae, oviposition experiments with extracts of E. cheiranthoides sprayed onto Brassica oleracea (cabbage) identified both attractants and deterrents. Whereas 3-methylsulfinylpropyl glucosinolate and 3-methylsufonylpropyl glucosinolate stimulated oviposition, erysimoside and erychroside in E. cheiranthoides extracts were deterrent. By contrast, another cardiac glycoside, erycordin, was inactive in this oviposition assay. Pieris rapae tarsal sensilla respond to both glucosinolates and cardenolides, indicating that these compounds are detected on the leaf surface prior to oviposition. Consistent with the deterrent effects on oviposition, cardenolides from E. cheiranthoides leaf extracts also served as feeding deterrents for P. rapae caterpillars. However, P. rapae adults readily lay eggs and caterpillars feed on mutant E. cheiranthoides plants that lack cardenolides.

Predatory paper wasps (Polistes dominulus) required more time to consume Pieris napi (green-veined white) caterpillars that had fed on E. cheiranthoides than those that had fed on Brassica oleracea (cabbage). This was ascribed to the time that it took the wasps to selectively remove the caterpillar guts, which contained plant material.

== Use as a model organism ==
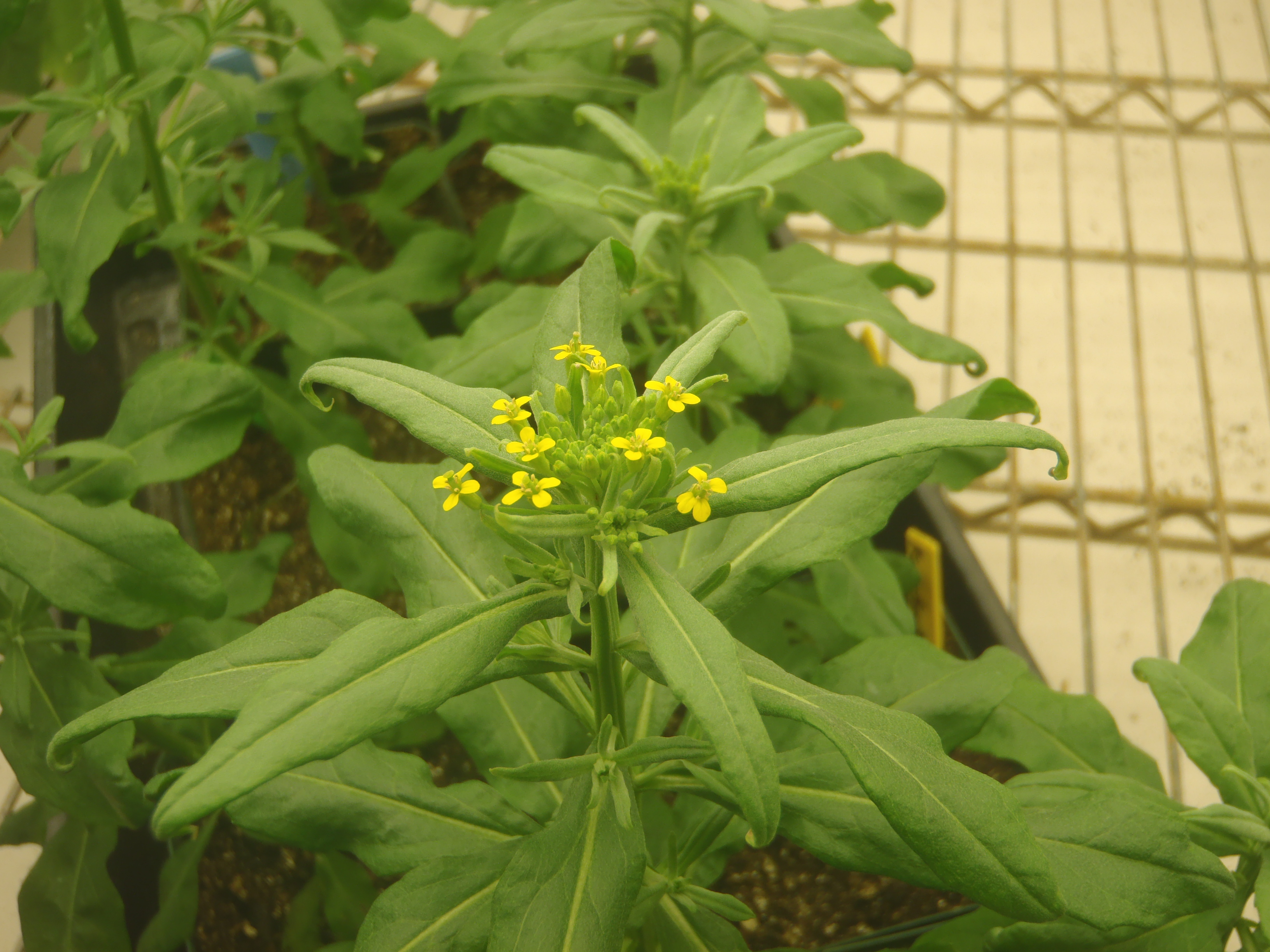
Erysimum cheiranthoides variety Elbtalaue in a growth chamber

Because Erysimum is in the family Brassicaceae, it has been proposed that many of the genetic resources that already exist for Arabidopsis thaliana (an extensively studied model organism) can be used with Erysimum to aide in genetic analysis, making this genus particularly attractive for studying the cardenolide biosynthetic pathway. E. cheiranthoides itself is diploid and has a relatively small genome (~200 Mbp across 8 chromosomes), can be grown from seed to seed production as fast as 10 weeks, and performs well in a laboratory setting. The genome of E. cheiranthoides variety Elbtalaue has been sequenced. As E. cheiranthoides has many genetic similarities to A. thaliana, it is likely that techniques for genetically modifying A. thaliana and related research methods will also work for E. cheiranthoides. Mutated isolates of E. cheiranthoides with altered cardiac glycoside content have been identified.

== Medicinal uses ==
Cardiac glycosides, which are abundant in E. cheiranthoides, have been used for treating heart disease and other ailments in traditional and modern medicine. However, E. cheiranthoides is not a commonly used source of these compounds. Nevertheless, E. cheiranthoides has been used as an herbal remedy in traditional Chinese medicine. European herbalists in the 16th century used the plant as a remedy for insect and animal bites. The common name wormseed wallflower comes from the use of E. cheiranthoides in treating intestinal worms.
