= Erysimum siliculosum =

Scientific classification
- Kingdom: Plantae
- Clade: Tracheophytes
- Clade: Angiosperms
- Clade: Eudicots
- Clade: Rosids
- Order: Brassicales
- Family: Brassicaceae
- Genus: Erysimum
- Species: E. siliculosum

Binomial name
- Erysimum siliculosum ((Marschall von Bieberstein) de Candolle, 1821)

Species of flowering plant

Erysimum siliculosum is a biennial or perennial herb from Xinjiang, Kazakhstan, Russia, and Turkmenistan, reaching 30–90 cm in height. It is closely related to Erysimum mongolicum. This species inhabits sandy areas and dunes from 400 to 1400 m of altitude.

== Description ==
Erysimum siliculosum produced trichomes malpighiaceous throughout, mixed with 3-forked ones on calyx. Stems erect, often branched at base and above. Basal leaves rosulate, often persisting, petiolate; leaf blade filiform to linear, rarely linear-oblanceolate, 1.5–8 cm × 1-2(-5) mm, longitudinally folded, base narrowly attenuate, margin entire, apex acute. Cauline leaves similar to basal.

== Reproductive biology ==
Erysimum siliculosum flowers from May to July, depending on the altitude.

Racemes are corymbose, densely flowered, ebracteate or rarely lowermost few flowers bracteate, elongated considerably in fruit. Fruiting pedicels are ascending or divaricate-ascending, (2-)4–6 mm, stout, narrower than fruit. Sepals are oblong-linear, (6-)7-9(-10) × 1–2 mm, united, persistent well after fruit maturity, strongly saccate.

Petals are bright yellow, obovate or broadly spatulate, (1.1-)1.4-1.8(-2) cm × 5–8 mm, apex rounded; claw distinct, subequaling sepals. Filaments yellow, 6–10 mm; anthers linear, 2–3 mm. Ovules 50-100 per ovary.

Fruit are oblong to oblong-linear, strongly 4-angled, slightly angustiseptate, (5-)7-10(-14) × 2–3 mm, smooth, erect and often appressed to rachis, straight; valves with a prominent midvein and slightly winged keel, outside with transversely oriented malpighiaceous trichomes, inside glabrous; style slender, (4-)5-10(-12) mm, cylindric; stigma strongly 2-lobed, with lobes often divergent. Seeds are oblong, 1.1-1.4 × 0.7-0.9 mm. 2n = 14.
