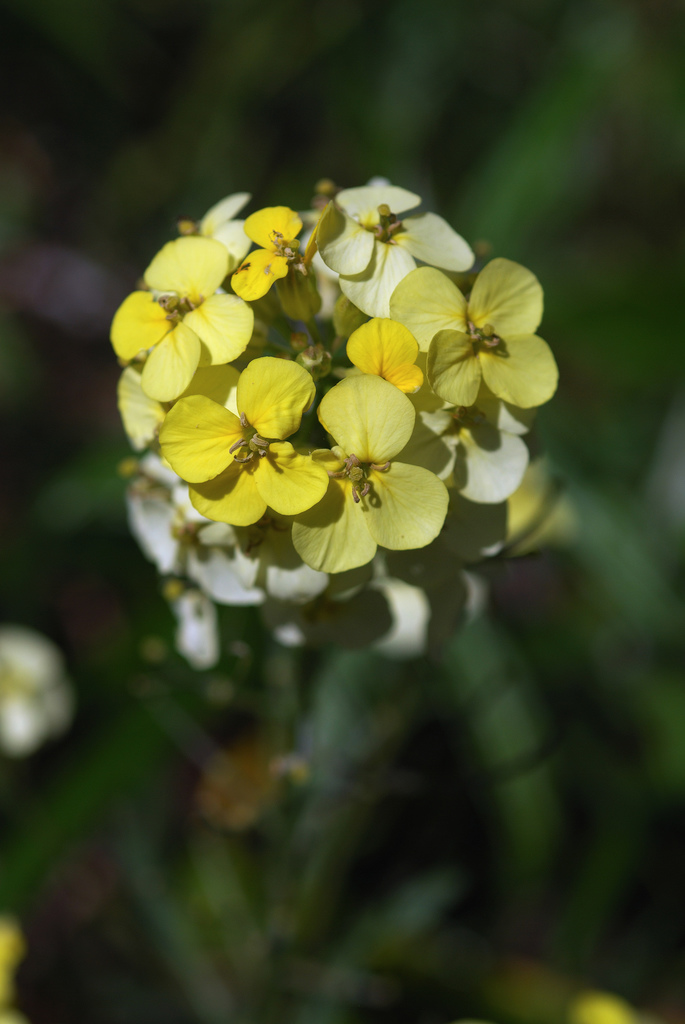

Conservation status
- Vulnerable (NatureServe)

Scientific classification
- Kingdom: Plantae
- Clade: Tracheophytes
- Clade: Angiosperms
- Clade: Eudicots
- Clade: Rosids
- Order: Brassicales
- Family: Brassicaceae
- Genus: Erysimum
- Species: E. franciscanum

Binomial name
- Erysimum franciscanum Rossbach

= Erysimum franciscanum =

Species of flowering plant

Erysimum franciscanum, commonly known as the Franciscan wallflower or San Francisco wallflower, is a plant endemic to the northern California coast, from Sonoma to Santa Cruz Counties. It is a member of the genus Erysimum in the mustard family, the Brassicaceae.

The plant is a biennial or short-lived perennial. The flowers are cream-colored to yellow, with four sepals and four petals arranged in a cross shape, as is characteristic of the Brassicaceae. It flowers from late winter to late spring. The plant prefers open scrubby areas with a fair amount of sunlight, but can flourish on a range of soils including disintegrating serpentine, gravelly and sandy soils. It is fairly easily cultivated in gardens.

Although not formally recognized as endangered, the Franciscan wallflower has a limited, discontinuous distribution. It is monitored at the Presidio of San Francisco, which was also its type locality. The plant is propagated in a nursery there and then planted in its native habitat.
