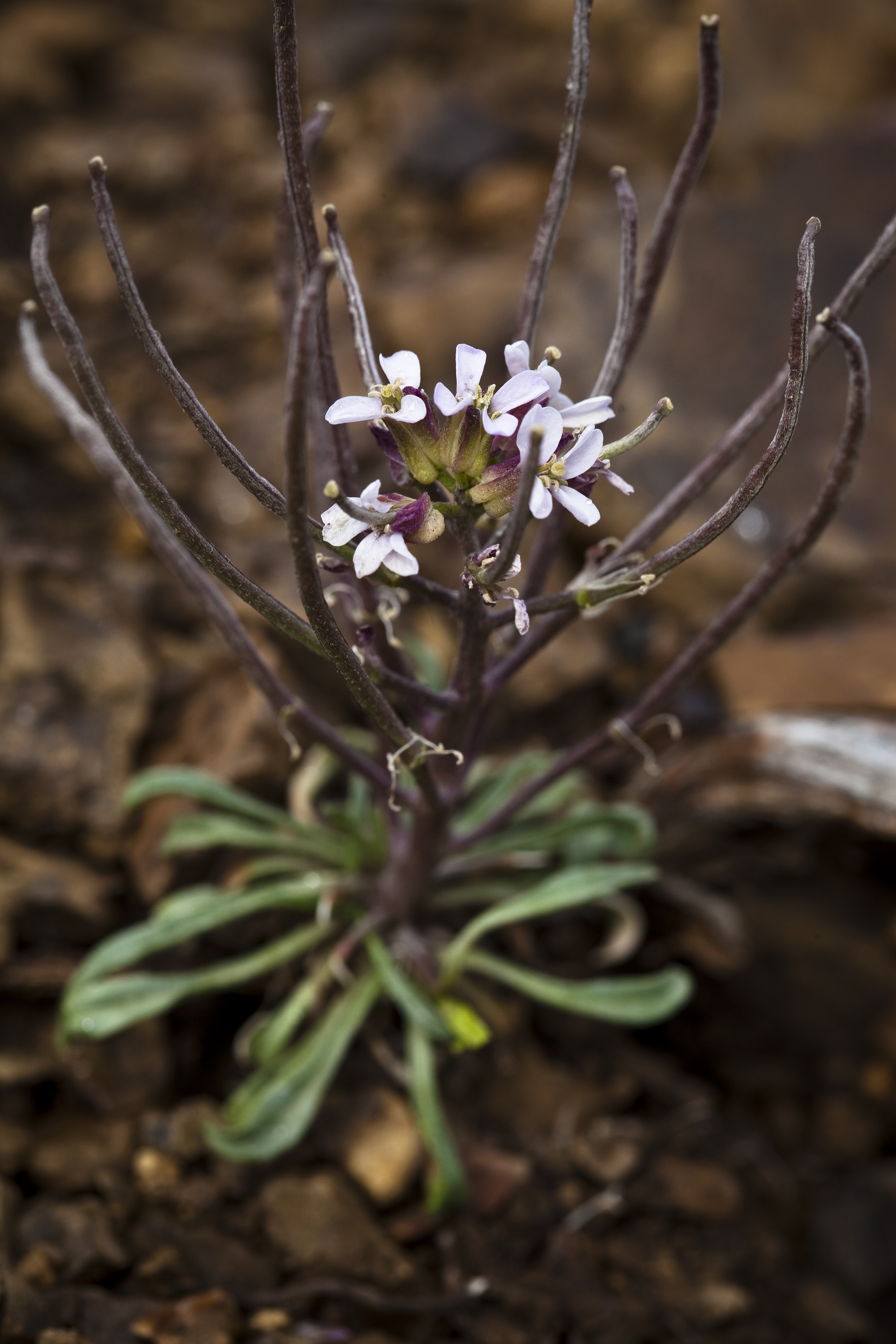

Scientific classification
- Kingdom: Plantae
- Clade: Embryophytes
- Clade: Tracheophytes
- Clade: Angiosperms
- Clade: Eudicots
- Clade: Rosids
- Order: Brassicales
- Family: Brassicaceae
- Genus: Erysimum
- Species: E. redowskii

Binomial name
- Erysimum redowskii Weinm.

Synonyms
- Cheiranthus pallasii Pursh; Cheiranthus pygmaeus Adams; Cheiranthus strigosus Ledeb.; Cheirinia pallasii (Pursh) Rydb.; Erysimum lanceolatum Cham. & Schltdl.; Erysimum pallasii (Pursh) Fernald; Erysimum pygmaeum (Adams) J.Gay; Erysimum strigosum (Ledeb.) DC.; Hesperis hookeri Ledeb.; Hesperis minima Torr. & A.Gray; Hesperis pallasii (Pursh) Torr. & A.Gray; Hesperis pygmaea (Adams) Hook.; Sisymbrium pygmaeum (Adams) Trautv.; Sisymbrium redowskii (Weinm.) Steud.

= Erysimum redowskii =

Species of flowering plant

Erysimum redowskii, synonym Erysimum pallasii, known as Pallas' wallflower, is a low shrub or mid shrub species from the Arctic. It has purple flowers that do not reflect UV.

== Taxonomy ==
Erysimum redowskii was first described by Johann Anton Weinmann in 1810. A description of Cheiranthus pallasii was first published by Frederick Traugott Pursh in 1813. It was transferred to Erysimum as Erysimum pallasii by Merritt Lyndon Fernald in 1925. E. pallasii was considered to be a synonym of E. redowskii by Adolf Polatschek in 2010 and 2012 listings of Erysimum species. The synonymy is accepted by Plants of the World Online, as of April 2021.

== Distribution ==
This wallflower has a circumpolar subarctic distribution, being found in the north of Europe, Asia and North America. It is widespread in the Canadian Arctic Archipelago, and common in Greenland, Northwest Canada and Alaska.

== Ecology ==
This species seems to be apomictic, since it is scarcely visited by insects and seed production is independent of flower visitors.
