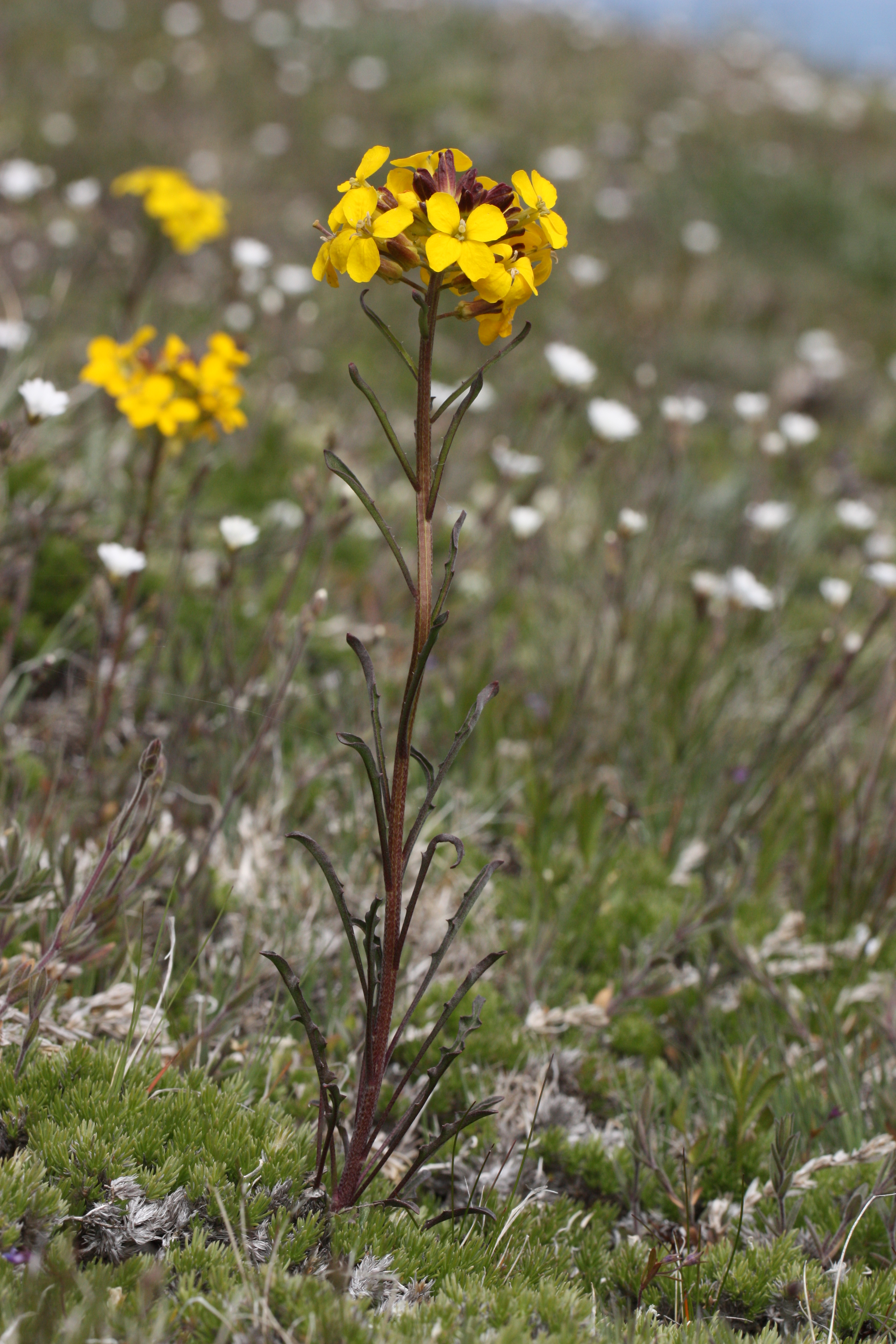
- Blooming on a ridge-top meadow

Conservation status
- Apparently Secure (NatureServe)

Scientific classification
- Kingdom: Plantae
- Clade: Tracheophytes
- Clade: Angiosperms
- Clade: Eudicots
- Clade: Rosids
- Order: Brassicales
- Family: Brassicaceae
- Genus: Erysimum
- Species: E. arenicola

Binomial name
- Erysimum arenicola S.Watson

Synonyms
- Cheiranthus arenicola (S.Watson) Greene

= Erysimum arenicola =

Cascade wallflower

Plant species in the cabbage family

Erysimum arenicola, the Cascade wallflower, is a plant in the [cabbage family]] native to British Columbia, Washington and Oregon. It is found at high elevations in the Cascade and Olympic Mountains as well as on Vancouver Island.

Cascade wallflowers are perennial herbs up to 30 cm tall. Leaves are narrow, up to 8 cm long. Flowers are yellow with four petals, borne in a raceme. Fruits are narrow and elongated, up to 10 cm long, straight or twisted, strongly torulose (= much narrower in between seeds) giving a lumpy appearance along the length of the mature fruit (silique).

== Taxonomy ==
In 1891 a new species was described in Erysimum by the botanist Sereno Watson, who named it Erysimum arenicola. Alongside the rest of the genus it is part of the Brassicaceae family. The species has one homotypic synonym, Cheiranthus arenicola, when Edward Lee Greene proposed reclassifying it in 1896.

== Range and habitat ==
Cascade wallflower is native to British Columbia in Canada and to Washington and Oregon in the United States. In British Columbia it is confined to Vancouver Island on Mount Arrowsmith, near the Kennedy River, around Cameron Lake, and on the Forbidden Plateau. In Washington it grows in the Olympic and Cascade mountains and is only found in northern Oregon. The species can be found at elevations of 900 to 2,200 meters (3,000–7,200 ft).
