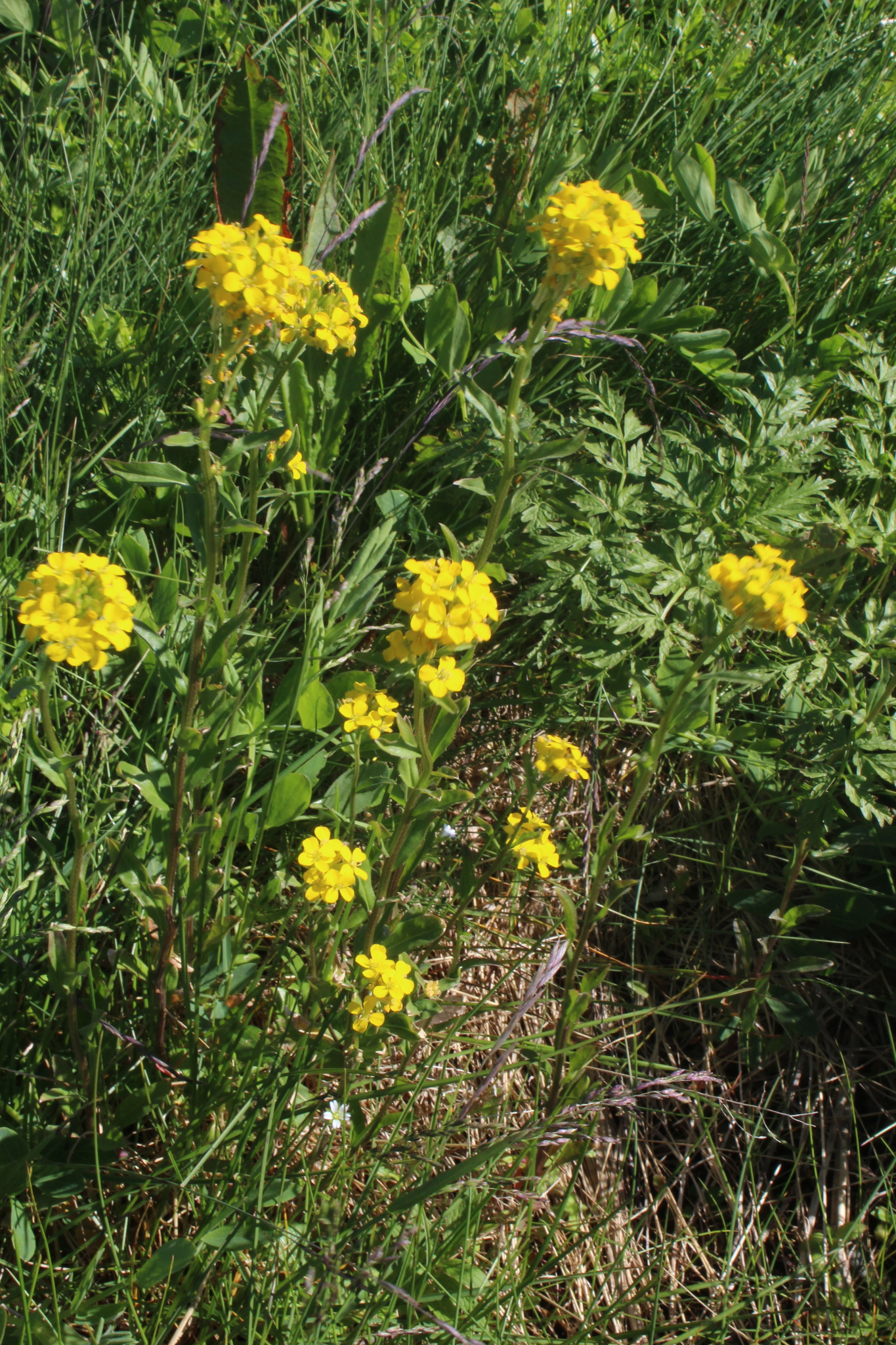

Scientific classification
- Kingdom: Plantae
- Clade: Tracheophytes
- Clade: Angiosperms
- Clade: Eudicots
- Clade: Rosids
- Order: Brassicales
- Family: Brassicaceae
- Genus: Erysimum
- Species: E. odoratum

Binomial name
- Erysimum odoratum Ehrh.

Synonyms
- Erysimum hieraciifolium L.

= Erysimum odoratum =

Species of flowering plant

Erysimum odoratum is a species of flowering plant belonging to the family Brassicaceae.

Its native range is Central Europe to Ukraine.
