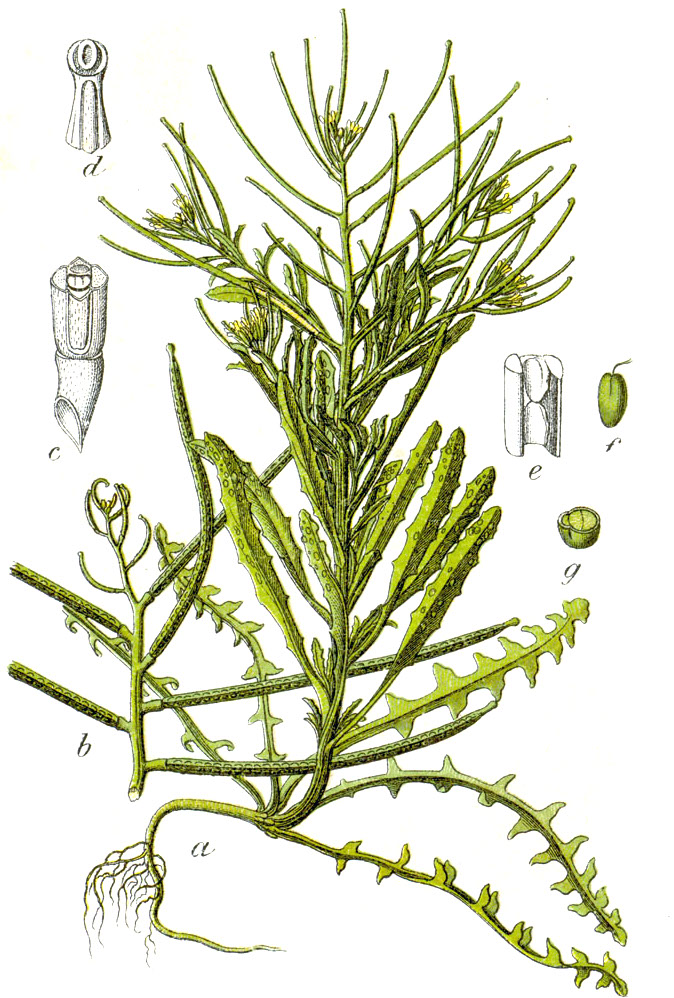

Scientific classification
- Kingdom: Plantae
- Clade: Tracheophytes
- Clade: Angiosperms
- Clade: Eudicots
- Clade: Rosids
- Order: Brassicales
- Family: Brassicaceae
- Genus: Erysimum
- Species: E. repandum

Binomial name
- Erysimum repandum L.

= Erysimum repandum =

Species of flowering plant

Erysimum repandum is a species of Erysimum known by several common names, including spreading wallflower, spreading treacle-mustard, and bushy wallflower.

It is native to Eurasia, but it is known in many other parts of the world as an introduced species and a common roadside weed.

Erysimum repandum is an annual herb growing up to about 0.5 m (1 ft 8 in) high. The leaves at the base of the stem are widely lance-shaped, bumpy or toothed along the edges, and up to 15 cm (5.9 in) long. The leaves higher up the stem are shorter, narrower, and more shallowly lobed or unlobed. The top of the stem is occupied by a raceme inflorescence of many yellow flowers. The fruit is a silique up to 10 cm (3.9 in) long.
