= Pierre-Joseph Redouté =

Belgian painter and botanist (1759–1840)

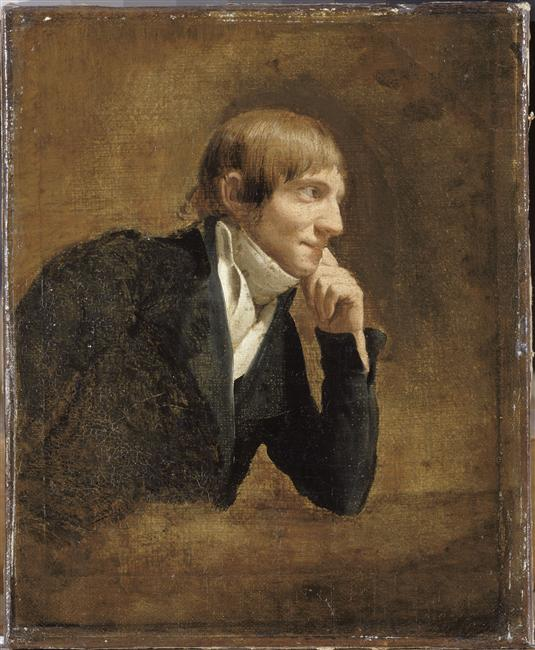
- Portrait by Louis Léopold Boilly
- Born: 10 July 1759; Saint-Hubert, Austrian Netherlands
- Died: 19 June 1840 (aged 80); Paris, France
- Resting place: Père Lachaise Cemetery
- Education: Jardin du Roi
- Known for: Botanical illustration
- Movement: Flower painting
- Awards: Chevalier of the Légion d'honneur (1825)

Pierre-Joseph Redouté (French pronunciation: [pjɛʁ ʒozɛf ʁədute], 10 July 1759 – 19 June 1840), was a painter and botanist from the Austrian Netherlands, known for his watercolours of roses, lilies and other flowers at the Château de Malmaison, many of which were published as large coloured stipple engravings. He was nicknamed "the Raphael of flowers" and has been called the greatest botanical illustrator of all time.

Redouté was an official court artist of Marie Antoinette, and continued painting through the French Revolution and Reign of Terror. He survived the turbulent political upheaval to gain international recognition for his precise renderings of plants, which remain as fresh in the early 21st century as when first painted. He combined great artistic skills with a pleasing and ingratiating personality which assisted him with his influential patrons. After Queen Marie-Antoinette, his patrons included both of Napoleon's wives – Empress Joséphine and Marie Louise, Duchess of Parma – as well as Maria Amalia of Naples and Sicily, wife of Louis Philippe I, the last king of France.

Redouté collaborated with the greatest botanists of his day and participated in nearly fifty publications depicting both the familiar flowers of the French court and plants from places as distant as Japan, America, South Africa, and Australia. He worked from live plants rather than herbarium specimens, which contributed to his fresh subtle renderings. He was painting during a period in botanical illustration (1798 – 1837) that is noted for the publication of outstanding folio editions with coloured plates. Redouté produced over 2,100 published plates depicting over 1,800 different species, many never rendered before. Of the French botanical illustrators employed in the French capital, Redouté is the one who remains in the public consciousness today. He is seen as an important heir to the tradition of the Flemish and Dutch flower painters Brueghel, Ruysch, van Huysum and de Heem.

== Early life ==
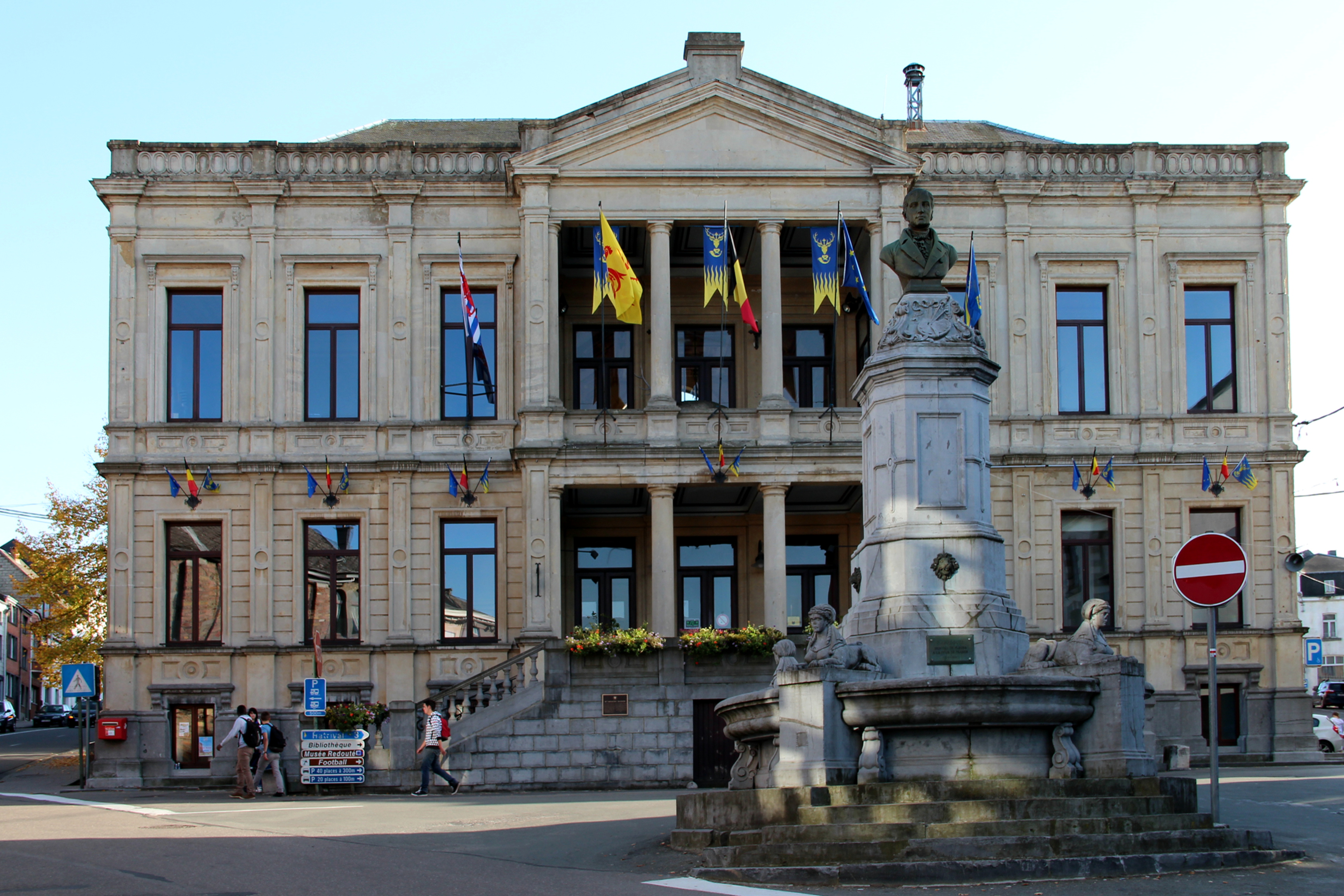
The fountain erected in honour of Pierre-Joseph Redouté in Saint-Hubert, Belgium.

Redouté was born 10 July 1759, in Saint-Hubert, in the Belgian Luxembourg. Both his father and grandfather were painters, and his elder brother, Antoine Ferdinand, was an interior decorator and scenery designer. He never had much in the way of formal education, instead leaving home at the age of 13 to earn his living as an itinerant painter, doing interior decoration, portraits, and religious commissions. Eventually, in 1782, he made his way to Paris to join his brother in painting scenery for theatres.

== Painting career ==
In Paris, Redouté met the botanists Charles Louis L'Héritier de Brutelle and René Desfontaines, who steered him towards botanical illustration, a rapidly growing discipline. L'Héritier became his instructor, teaching him to dissect flowers and portray their specific characteristics with precision. L'Heritier also introduced Redouté to members of the court at Versailles, following which Marie Antoinette became his patron. Redouté eventually received the title of Draughtsman and Painter to the Queen's Cabinet.

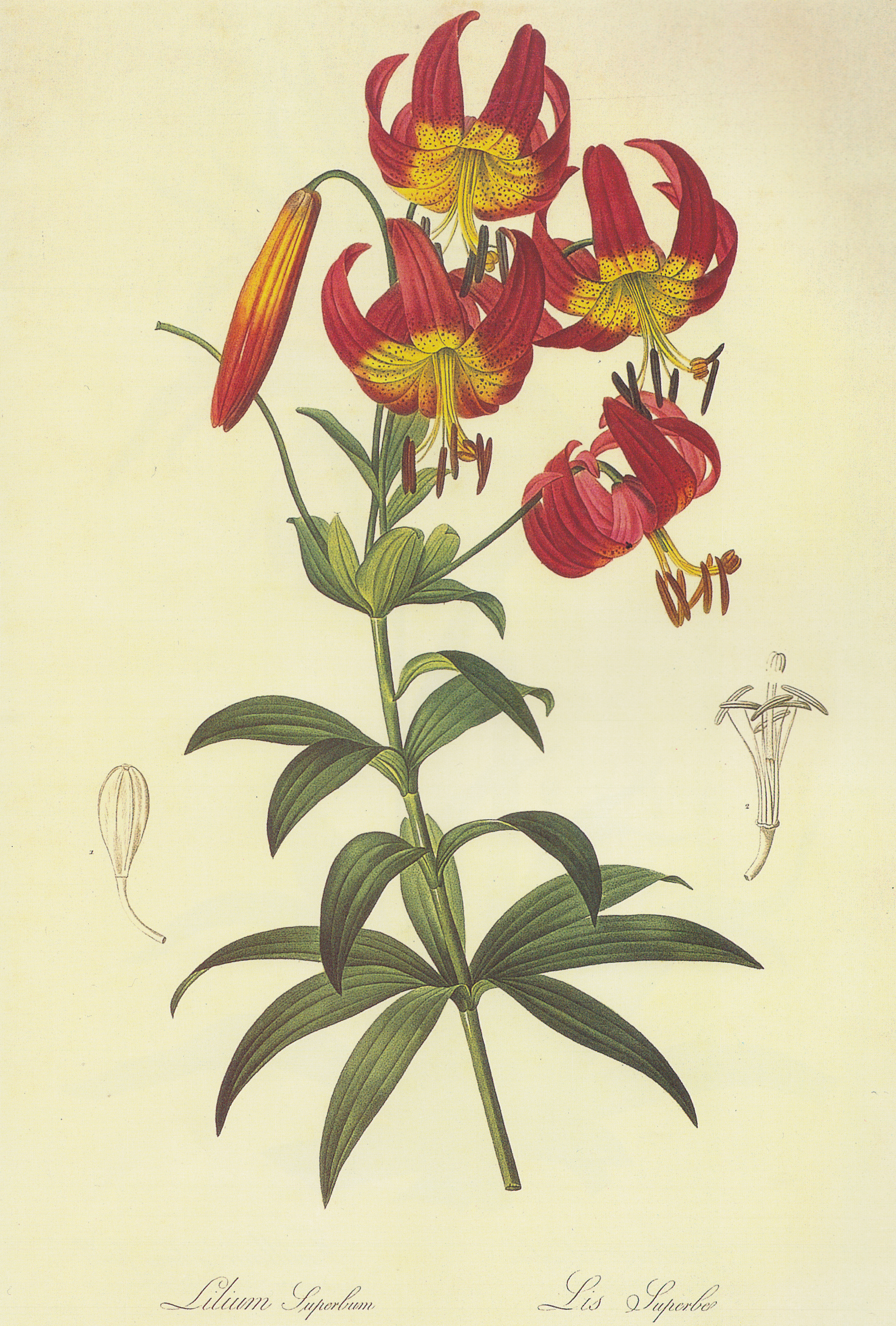
Botanical illustration of Lilium superbum

Cheveau, a Parisian dealer, brought the young artist to the attention of the botanical artist Gerard van Spaendonck at the Jardin du Roi, which became the Jardin des plantes of the National Museum of Natural History, France in 1793, after the Revolution. Van Spaendonck became another of Redouté's teachers, especially influencing his handling of watercolour.

In 1786, Redouté began to work at the National Museum of Natural History cataloguing the collections of flora and fauna and participating in botanical expeditions. In 1787, he left France to study plants at the Royal Botanic Gardens, Kew near London, returning the following year. In 1792 he was employed by the French Academy of Sciences. In 1798, Empress Joséphine de Beauharnais, the first wife of Napoleon Bonaparte, became his patron and, some years later, he became her official artist. In 1809, Redouté taught painting to Princess Adélaïde of Orléans.

Redouté was engaged to paint selected plants from the garden at the Château de Malmaison, Paris. Whilst he was well known for the painting Les Roses, Jardin de la Malmaison has a distinctly Australian connection, as 46 of the 120 plates featured Australian plants, and the majority of these are endemic to Queensland. One of the first Australian plants Empress Joséphine chose for Redouté to illustrate was a common Queensland flowering vine, Hardenbergia violacea (false sarsaparilla), a vine seen in abundance in the Queensland bush. Other Queensland plants illustrated include the Pandorea pandorana (wonga wonga vine), Melaleuca styphelioides (prickly-leaved paperbark), and Hibiscus heterophyllus (native rosella).

== Later career and legacy ==
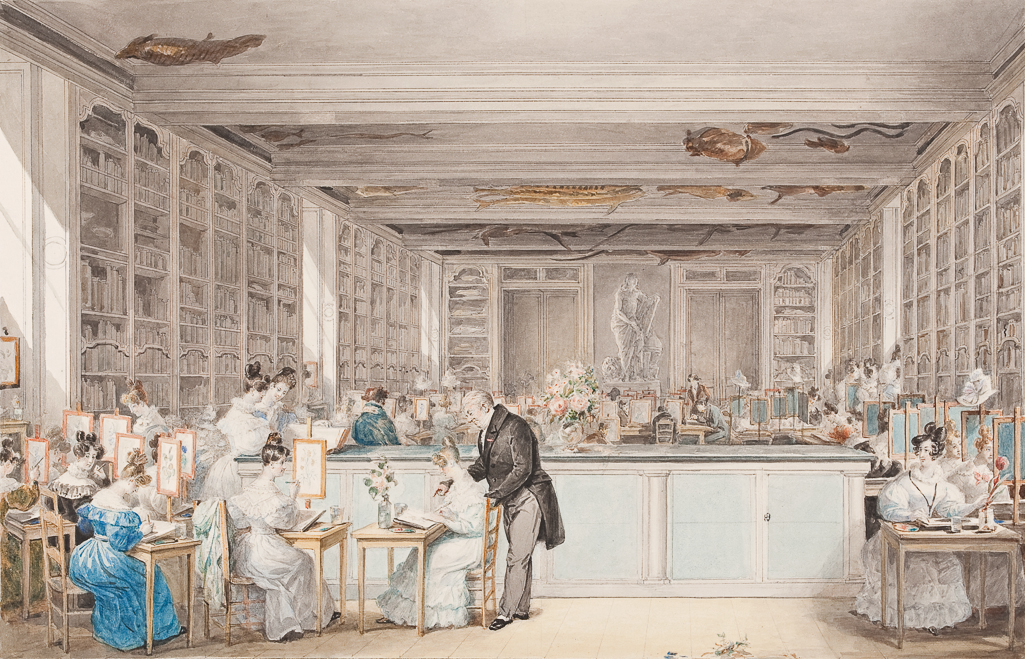
Julie Ribault, Redoute's school of botanical drawing in the Salle Buffon of the Jardin des Plantes, 1830 (Fitzwilliam Museum)

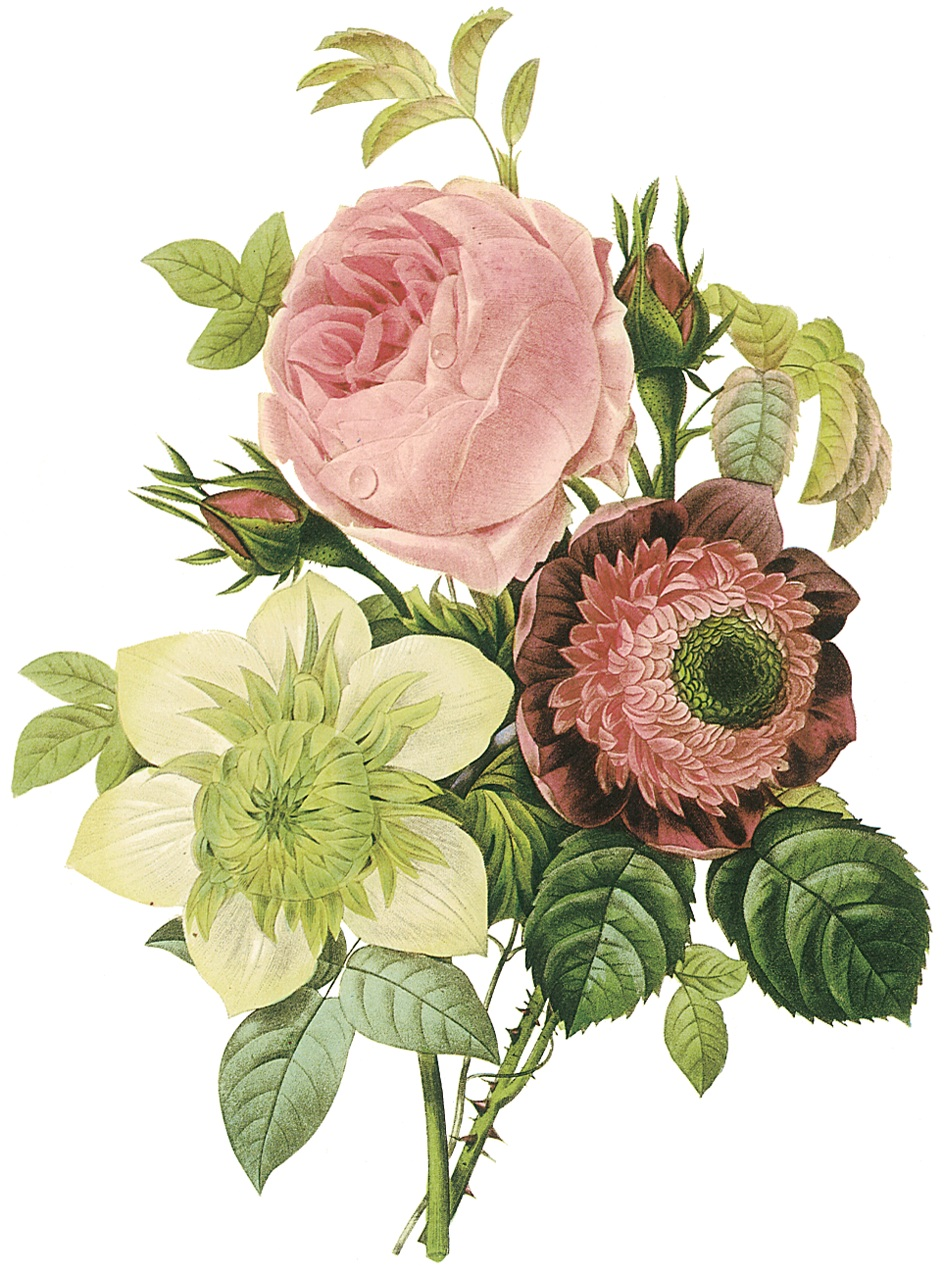
Flowers by the artist (Rosa centifolia, anemone, and clematis)

After Empress Joséphine's death (1814), Redouté had some difficult years until he was appointed a master of draughtsmanship for the National Museum of Natural History in 1822. In 1824, he gave some drawing classes at the museum. Many of his pupils were aristocrats or royalty. He became a Chevalier of the Legion of Honour in 1825. Although particularly renowned for his botanical exploration of roses and lilies, he thereafter produced paintings purely for aesthetic value.

Redouté taught and painted up to the day he died of a stroke on 19 or 20 June 1840. He was survived by his wife, Marie-Marte Gobert, whom he married in 1786, and their two daughters. He was interred in Père Lachaise Cemetery. A Brussels school bears his name: the Institut Redouté-Peiffer in Anderlecht.

Most of the Les Liliacées watercolours went from the Empress Joséphine to her son from her first marriage Eugène de Beauharnais. Most of the watercolours of her Jardin de la Malmaison (gardens of Château de Malmaison) were acquired by the Fitzwilliam Museum in Cambridge.

Redouté's paintings for Les Roses were bought by Charles X of France for his widowed daughter-in-law, Marie-Caroline of Bourbon-Two Sicilies, Duchess of Berry. Their whereabouts are virtually untraceable: in 1948 some were sold by Sotheby's in London and a few were acquired by the Hunt Institute for Botanical Documentation; later, single sheets have appeared repeatedly in auction.

In 1985, 468 leaves were bought at a New York auction by an art dealer for approximately $5.5 million and then dispersed.

In the 20th and 21st century, numerous exhibitions in Europe, the Americas, and Australia have been devoted to the work of Redouté. The Biodiversity Heritage Library, the Library of Congress and other libraries have made many of his works accessible online and reproductions of his prints are available from virtually all print and poster shops.

== Principal works ==
- Geraniologia,, ed. Petri-Francisci Didot (1787–88)
- Traité des arbres et arbustes que l'on cultive en France, par Duhamel. Nouvelle édition, avec des figures, d'après les dessins de P. J. Redouté, 7 vols. (1800–1819)
- Les Liliacées, 8 vols. (1802–1816); Taschen America (2000) ISBN 3-8228-6407-2; SCD, University of Strasbourg. (1802–1816) On line.
- Les Roses, 3 vols. (1817–1824); French & European Pubns (1954) ISBN 0-320-05904-9; Pierre-Joseph Redoute, Sandra Raphael (Narrator), Ian Jackson (Translator), CD-ROM Octavo (2002) ISBN 1-891788-28-0; NYPL On Line. or Rare Book Room (1817–1824 from Library of Congress) or Rare Book Room (1817 from The Warnock Library). Taschen has also published this as part of its 25th Anniversary series.
- Redouté, Pierre-Joseph; with Candolle, Augustin Pyramus (1790). Plantes grasses. Levrault. Archived from the original on 6 December 2008.
- Choix des plus belles fleurs et de quelques branches des plus beaux fruits. Dédié à LL. AA. RR. les princesses Louise et Marie d'Orléans (1827) Online facsimile - Biodiversity Heritage Library
- Catalogue de 486 liliacées et de 168 roses peintes par P.-J. Redouté (1829)
- Alphabet Flore (1835)

Posthumously published, in 1989:

- Champignons du Luxembourg. Planches inédites de Pierre-Joseph Redouté (1759–1840). Manuscrit de Louis Marchand (1807–1843). Ministère d'Etat. Government commission for the commemoration of the 150th anniversary of Independence of the Grand Duchy of Luxembourg; Musée national d'histoire naturelle; Société des naturalistes luxembourgeois, 1989.

== Paintings ==
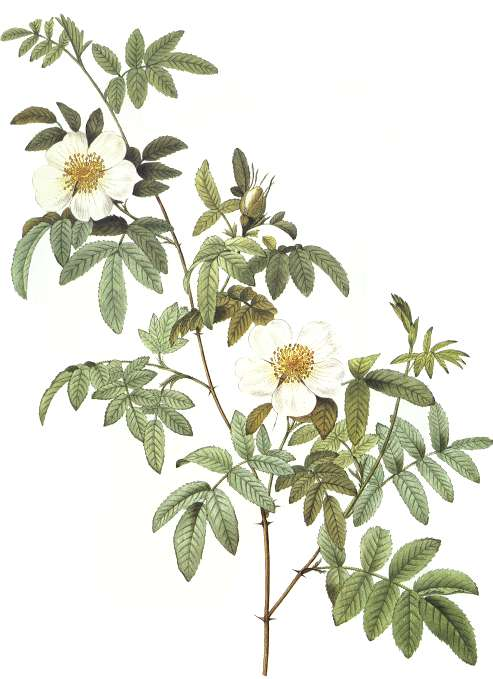
Rosa clinophylla

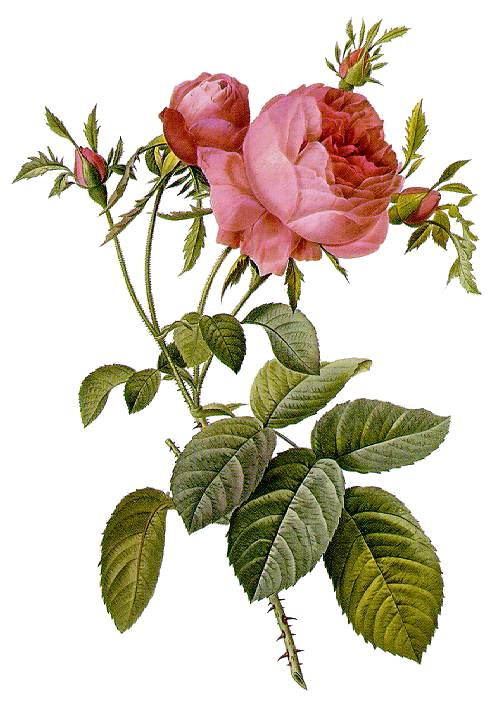
Rosa centifolia (cabbage rose)

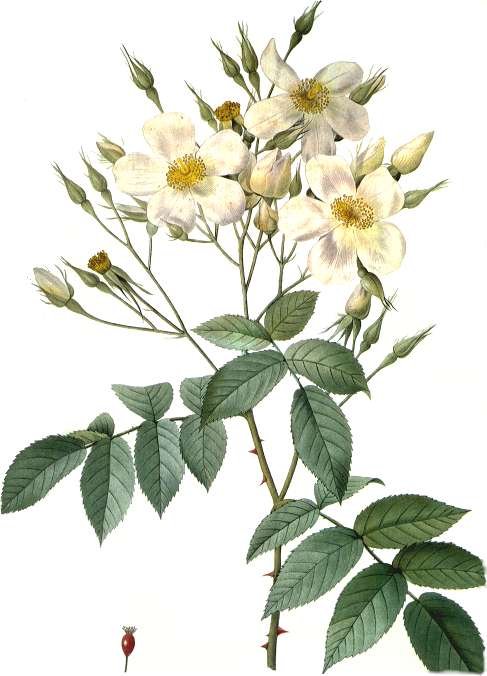
Rosa moschata (musk rose)

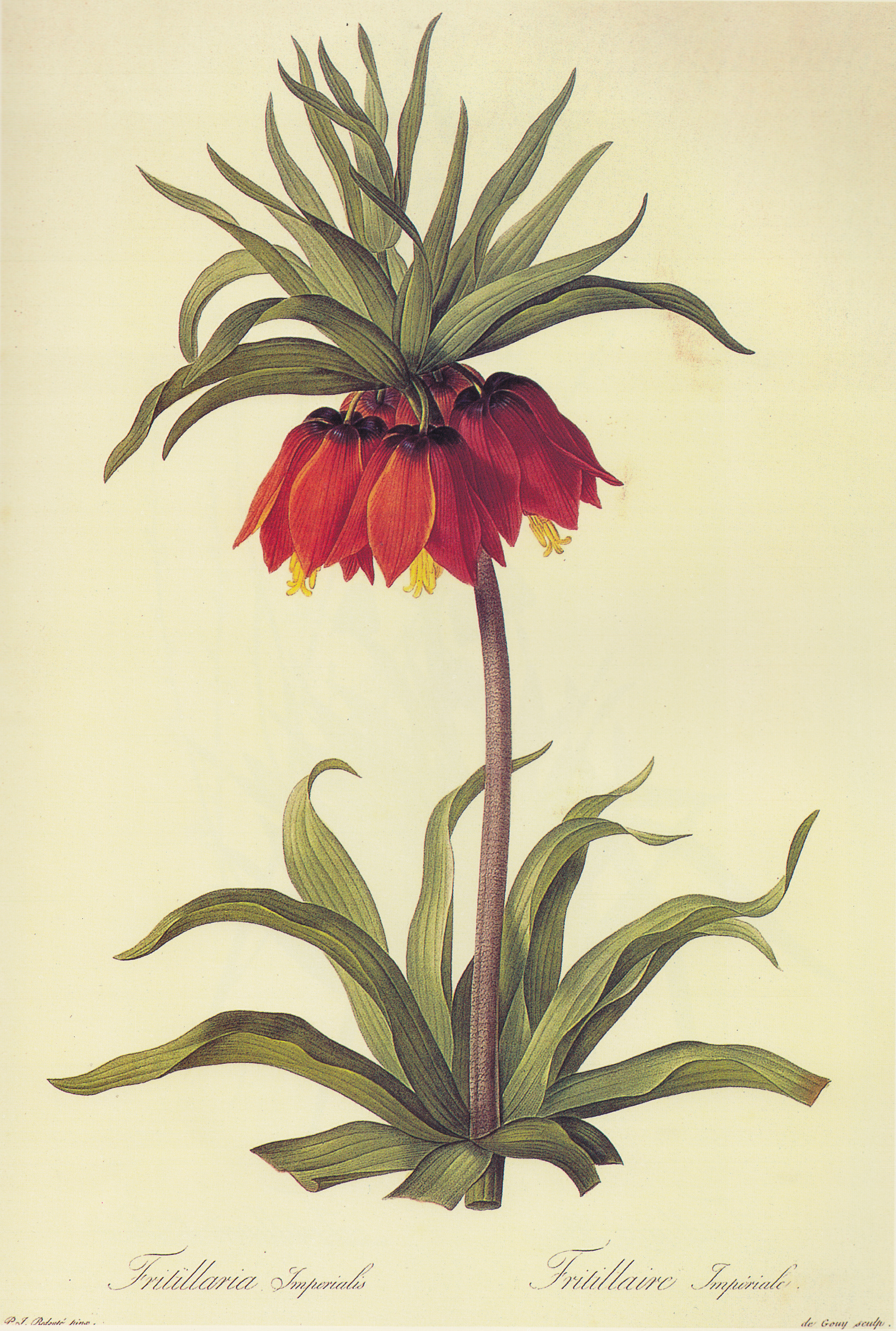
Fritillaria imperialis

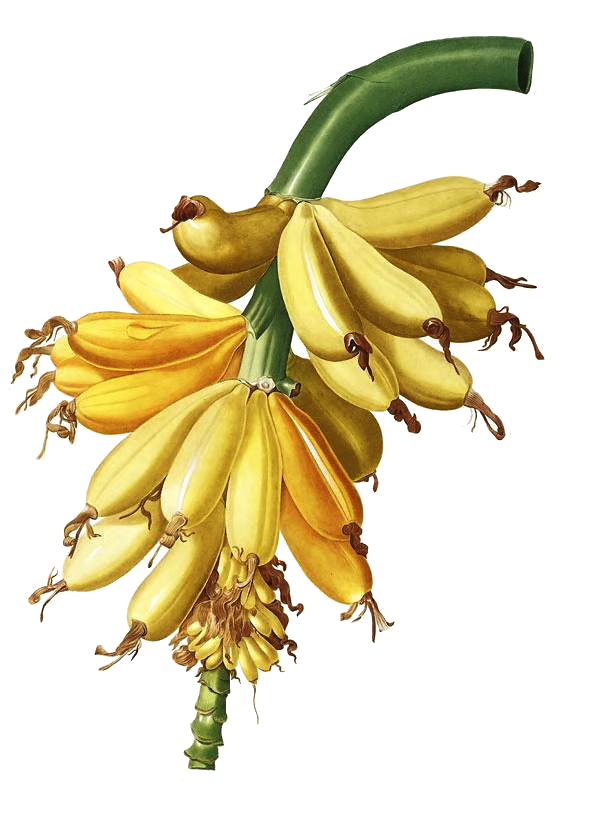
Musa × paradisiaca

== Sources ==
- "Redouté, Pierre-Joseph". SCD, Universities of Strasbourg. Archived from the original on 11 December 2007.
- Redouté, Pierre-Joseph; Raphael, Sandra (narrator) (2004) [1827–1833]. Choix des Plus Belles Fleurs. Translated by Jackson, Ian. Paris: California Academy of Sciences / Octavo. ISBN 1-59110-053-4.
- Musée de la Vie romantique (Paris) (2017). Le Pouvoir des fleurs: Pierre-Joseph Redouté (1759-1840) (in French). Paris: Paris Musées. ISBN 978-2-7596-0345-9.. This is the catalog of the exhibition at the Musée de la vie romantique in Paris, April 28 to October 1, 2017.

== Literature ==
- Blunt, Wilfrid; Stearn, William T. (1994) [1950]. "The Art of Botanical Illustration". The Age of Redouté. London: Collins. pp. 173–183. ISBN 0-486-27265-6. Publisher 2 - Dover Publications.
- Dierkens, Alain; Lawalrée, Andre; Duvosquel, Jean-Marie (1996). Pierre-Joseph Redouté, 1759–1840: La Famille, L'Oeuvre, ("Pierre-Joseph Redouté, 1759–150: his life and works"). Saint-Hubert, Belgium: Centre Pierre-Joseph Redouté. ISBN 2-87193-238-7.
- Redouté, Pierre-Joseph. "Choix des Plus Belles Fleurs". Octavo Editions. Archived from the original on 5 August 2010. CD-ROM
- Ridge, Antonia (1974). The Man Who Painted Roses: Story of Pierre-Joseph Redoute. Faber and Faber. ISBN 978-0571105540.
