= Taraxacum atrans =

Scientific classification
- Kingdom: Plantae
- Clade: Tracheophytes
- Clade: Angiosperms
- Clade: Eudicots
- Clade: Asterids
- Order: Asterales
- Family: Asteraceae
- Genus: Taraxacum
- Species: T. atrans

Binomial name
- Taraxacum atrans Schischk.

Synonyms
- Taraxacum pamiricum Schischk.

Species of water lily

Taraxacum atrans is a species of terrestrial, perennial, herb in the family Asteraceae native to the region from central Asia to Mongolia and West Himalaya.

== Description ==
=== Vegetative characteristics ===
Taraxacum atrans is a terrestrial, perennial, 6–10 cm tall herb with slender roots. The rosulate, glabrous, oblanceolate, undivided leaves with glabrous, pale green, winged or unwinged petioles are 2–8 cm long, and 3–12 mm wide.

=== Generative characteristics ===
The solitary to few brown to green scapes with arachnoid hairs below the capitulum are almost as long as the leaves. The yellow capitulum is 1.5–2 cm wide. The florets are light yellow. Pollen is rarely produced, but if present, the grains are irregularly sized. The achenes are yellowish-brown. The yellowish white pappus is 5.5–6 mm long.

== Taxonomy ==
It was described by Boris Konstantinovich Schischkin in 1964. It has one synonym: Taraxacum pamiricum Schischk. However, it was remarked that it is difficult to compare Taraxacum atrans to other taxa, because the type specimen does not possess achenes and the description of the achenes in the original publication may refer to unripe achenes or to achenes from another species.

=== Etymology ===
The specific epithet atrans means darkening.

== Distribution and habitat ==
It is native to Kazakhstan, Kirgizstan, Mongolia, Tadzhikistan, Pakistan, and India, where it occurs in alpine pastures, stony slopes, gravel beds, and alpine salt-marshes.

== Cultivation ==
It can be cultivated in moist or well drained, gravelly, humus-rich soil under bright conditions.
