= Flora Europaea =

Book

- Flora Europaea vol 2 front cover
- Author: eds. T. G. Tutin, V. H. Heywood, N. A. Burges, D. H. Valentine, S. M. Walters, D. A. Webb
- Publisher: Cambridge University Press
- Publication date: 6 December 2001
- Publication place: United Kingdom
- Media type: Hardback (5 vols) + CD
- Pages: 2392
- ISBN: 978-0-521-80570-4

The Flora Europaea is a 5-volume encyclopedia of plants, published between 1964 and 1993 by Cambridge University Press. The aim was to describe all the national Floras of Europe in a single, authoritative publication to help readers identify any wild or widely cultivated plant in Europe to the subspecies level. It also provides information on geographical distribution, habitat preference, and chromosome number, where known.

The Flora was released in CD form in 2001, and the Royal Botanic Garden Edinburgh have made an index to the plant names available online.

== History ==
The idea of a pan-European Flora was first mooted at the 8th International Congress of Botany in Paris in 1954. In 1957, Britain's Science and Engineering Research Council provided grants to fund a secretariat of three people, and Volume 1 was published in 1964. More volumes were issued in the following years, culminating in 1980 with the monocots of Volume 5. The royalties were put into a trust fund administered by the Linnean Society, which allowed funding for Dr John Akeroyd to continue work on the project. A revised Volume 1 was launched at the Linnean Society on 11 March 1993.

== Volumes ==
=== Volume 1 : Lycopodiaceae to Platanaceae ===
Published 1964

=== Volume 2: Rosaceae to Umbelliferae ===
ISBN 0-521-06662-X
ISBN 978-0-521-06662-4
Published : 1 Dec 1968 (486 pages)

=== Volume 3: Diapensiaceae to Myoporaceae ===
ISBN 0-521-08489-X
ISBN 978-0-521-08489-5
Published : 28 Dec 1972 (399 pages)

=== Volume 4: Plantaginaceae to Compositae (and Rubiaceae) ===
ISBN 0-521-08717-1
ISBN 978-0-521-08717-9
Published: 5 Aug 1976 (534 pages)

=== Volume 5: Alismataceae to Orchidaceae ===
ISBN 0-521-20108-X
ISBN 978-0-521-20108-7
Published: 3 April 1980 (476 pages)

=== Volume 1 Revised: Psilotaceae to Platanaceae ===
ISBN 0-521-41007-X
ISBN 978-0-521-41007-6
Published: 22 April 1993 (629 pages)

=== 5 Volume Set and CD-ROM Pack ===
ISBN 0-521-80570-8
ISBN 978-0-521-80570-4
Published: 6 Dec 2001 (2392 pages)

== Editors ==
The editors named on every edition are :

Tom Tutin (1908–1987) – Professor of Botany at University of Leicester
Vernon Heywood (1927–2022) – Chief Scientist, Plant Conservation, IUCN and professor at University of Reading
Alan Burges (1911–2002) – Professor of Botany at University of Liverpool
David Valentine (1912–1987) – Professor of Botany at Durham University until 1966, then at University of Manchester

For the Revised Edition of Volume 1 only :

David Moore (1933–2013) – Professor at University of Reading

For the CD set only :

Max Walters (1920–2005) – Director, Cambridge University Botanic Garden
David Webb (1912–1994) – Professor of Botany at Trinity College, Dublin

== Regional advisers ==
A panel of regional advisers was formed, in order to ensure full coverage of the whole of Europe. Several of the advisers were also authors in their respective taxonomic specialities. For each country the representatives were:

- Albania - F. Markgraf
- Austria - E. Janchen, K. H. Rechinger
- Belgium - A. Lawalrée
- Bulgaria - N. Stojanov
- Czechoslovakia - J. Dostál
- Denmark - T. W. Bōcher
- Finland - J. Jalas
- France - H. Gaussen, P. Jovet
- Germany - H. Merxmüller, W. Rothmaler
- Greece - K. H. Rechinger
- Hungary - R. Soó, S. Jávorka
- Iceland - I. Óskarsson
- Italy - R. E. G. Pichi-Sermolli
- Jugoslavia - E. Mayer
- Netherlands - S. J. Van Ooststroom
- Norway - R. Nordhagen
- Poland - B. Pawlowski
- Portugal - A. R. Pinto da Silva
- Romania - A. Borza, E. I. Nyárády
- Spain - E. Guinea, Oriol de Bolòs
- Sweden - N. Hylander
- Switzerland - E. Landolt
- Turkey - P. H. Davis
- U.S.S.R. - B. K. Schischkin, Andrey A. Fedorov

== See also ==
- Species Plantarum – the first attempt at an encyclopedia of plants

== Geographical Codes ==
The geographical distribution is indicated by a series of two letter codes.

| Two Letter Code | Geographical Region |
|---|---|
| Al | Albania |
| Au | Austria with Liechtenstein |
| Az | Açores (Azores) |
| Be | Belgium |
| Bl | Islas Baleares (Balearic Islands) |
| Br | Great Britain, including Orkney, Zetland and Isle of Man; excluding Channel Islands and Northern Ireland |
| Bu | Bulgaria |
| Co | Corse (Corsica) |
| Cr | Kriti (Creta) (Crete) with Karpathos, Kasos and Gavdhos |
| Cz | Czechoslovakia (Czech Republic and Slovak Republic) |
| Da | Denmark |
| Fa | Færöer (Faroe Islands) |
| Fe | Finland (Fennia), including Ahvenanmaa (Åland) |
| Ga | France (Gallia), with the Channel Islands (Îles Normandes) and Monaco; excluding Corse (Corsica) |
| Ge | Germany |
| Gr | Greece, excluding those islands included under Kriti (Crete) (supra) and those outside Europe as defined for Flora Europaea |
| Hb | Ireland (Hibernia); both the Republic of Ireland and Northern Ireland |
| He | Switzerland (Helvetia) |
| Ho | Netherlands (Hollandia) |
| Hs | Spain (Hispania) with Gibraltar and Andorra; excluding Islas Baleares (Balearic Islands) |
| Hu | Hungary |
| Is | Iceland (Islandia) |
| It | Italy, including the Arcipelago Toscano; excluding Sardegna and Sicilia |
| Ju | Jugoslavia (Yugoslavia) |
| Lu | Portugal (Lusitania) |
| No | Norway |
| Po | Poland |
| Rm | Romania |
| Rs | Territories of the former U.S.S.R. |
| Rs(N) | Northern Division: Arctic Europe, Karelo-Lapland, Dvina-Pecora |
| Rs(B) | Baltic Division: Estonia, Latvia, Lithuania, Kaliningradskaja Oblast' |
| Rs(C) | Central Division: Ladoga-Ilmen, Upper Volga, Volga-Kama, Upper Dnepr, Volga-Don, Ural |
| Rs(W) | South-western Division: Moldavia, Middle Dnepr, Black Sea, Upper Dnestr |
| Rs(K) | Krym (Crimea) |
| Rs(E) | South-eastern Division: Lower Don, Lower Volga Region, Transvolga |
| Sa | Sardegna (Sardinia) |
| Sb | Svalbard, comprising Spitsbergen, Björnöya (Bear Island) and Jan Mayen |
| Si | Sicilia, with Pantelleria, Isole Pelagie, Isole Lipari and Ustica; also the Malta archipelago |
| Su | Sweden (Suecia), including Öland and Gotland |
| Tu | Turkey (European part), including Gökçeada (Imroz) |
