= Pilopleura =

Scientific classification
- Kingdom: Plantae
- Clade: Tracheophytes
- Clade: Angiosperms
- Clade: Eudicots
- Clade: Asterids
- Order: Apiales
- Family: Apiaceae
- Subfamily: Apioideae
- Tribe: Selineae
- Genus: Pilopleura; Schischk.

Genus of plants

Pilopleura is a genus of flowering plants belonging to the family Apiaceae.

Its native range is Central Asia.

Species:

- Pilopleura goloskokovii (Korovin) Pimenov
- Pilopleura tordyloides (Korovin) Pimenov
