= André Lawalrée =

Belgian botanist, pteridologist (1921–2005)

André Gilles Célestin Lawalrée
- Born: 2 February 1921; Terwagne, Clavier, Liège, Belgium
- Died: 18 April 2005 (aged 84)
- Scientific career
- Fields: Botany, pteridology
- Institutions: National Botanic Garden of Belgium
- Author abbrev. (botany): Lawalrée

André Gilles Célestin Lawalrée (2 February 1921 – 18 April 2005) was a Belgian botanist and pteridologist. He was head of the Department of Vascular Plants (Spermatophyta-Pteridophyta) in the National Botanic Garden of Belgium. As an expert on the Belgian flora he was invited to act as the regional adviser for Belgium on the Flora Europaea project. He also made a study of the flora of central Africa, especially that of the former Belgian Congo (now Democratic Republic of the Congo).

He was interested in and wrote about the lives of earlier Belgian botanists, such as Marie-Anne Libert and Pierre-Joseph Redouté.

== Flora sections ==
Sections of a flora of Central Africa, defined as "Congo, Rwanda and Burundi"

- 1969. Flore d'Afrique Centrale: Ptéridophytes, Psilotaceae 5 pp.
- 1969. Flore d'Afrique Centrale: Ptéridophytes, Parkeriaceae 5 pp.
- 1969. Flore d'Afrique Centrale: Ptéridophytes, Equisetaceae 5 pp.
- 1969. Flore d'Afrique Centrale: Ptéridophytes, Actiniopteridaceae 9 pp.
- 1970. Flore d'Afrique Centrale: Ptéridophytes, Schizaeceae 10 pp.
- 1971. Flore d'Afrique Centrale: Ptéridophytes, Blechnaceae 11 pp.
- 1972. Flore d'Afrique Centrale: Spermatophytes, Valerianacea 5 pp.
- 1976. Flore d'Afrique Centrale: Ptéridophytes, Azollaceae 5 pp.
- 1979. Flore d'Afrique Centrale: Spermatophytes, Dipsacaceae 12 pp.
- 1981. (with G Bruynseels) Flore d'Afrique Centrale: Spermatophytes, Pontederiaceae 11 pp.
- 1982. Flore d'Afrique Centrale: Spermatophytes, Caprifoliaceae. 6 pp.
- 1986. (with D Dethier, E Gilissen) Flore d'Afrique Centrale: Spermatophytes, Compositae (Part 1): Subfamily Cichorioideae. 72 pp.
- 1988. (with E Landolt) Flore d'Afrique Centrale: Spermatophytes, Lemnaceae. 12 pp
- 1990. Flore d'Afrique Centrale: Ptéridophytes, Lycopodiaceae. 22 pp.
- 1993. Flore d'Afrique Centrale: Ptéridophytes, Davalliaceae. 8 pp.
- 2000. Flore d'Afrique Centrale: Ptéridophytes, Nephrolepidaceae. 16 pp'

=== Other publications ===
- 1950. (with others) Flore générale de Belgique - Ptéridophytes. Jardin botanique de l'État. 194 pp.
- 1952-1993. (with others) Flore générale de Belgique. - Spermatophytes Jardin botanique de l'Etat
- 1961 (with Jan Balis) L'orchidée en Belgique: catalogue de l'exposition. Nº 5 de Catalogues des expositions organisées à la Bibliothèque Albert Ier, à Bruxelles. Ed. Bibliothèque royale de Belgique. 77 pp.
- 1965. Marie-Anne Libert - Botaniste (1782 - 1865). Biographie, Genealogie, Bibliographie. 120 pp.
- 1972. (with F. Badre) Flore du Cameroun. Malpighiacées, Linacées, Lépidobotryacées, Cténolophonacées, Humiriacées, Erythroxylacées, Ixonanthacée - Santalacées
- 1973. (with F. Badre) Flore du Gabon. Malpighiacées, Nectaropétalacées, Lépidobotryacées, Cténolophonacées, Humiriacées, Erythroxylacées, Ixonanthacées - Santalacées
- 1974. La création d'Oncidium limminghei E. Morren. 4 pp.
- 1978. Inleiding tot de flora van België. 67 pp.
- 1981. Plantes sauvages protégées en Belgique, also published as Beschermde wilde planten in België. Ed. Ministerie van Landbouw, Nationale Plantentuin van België. 91 pp.
- 1987. Les jardins aquatiques: un rêve, un défi, une découverte!. Ed. Vander. 320 pp. ISBN 2-8008-0015-1
- 1996 (with others). Pierre-Joseph Redouté, 1759-1840 : la famille, l'œuvre. Bruxelles : Crédit communal
- 2009 (with Joseph Beaujean, Marcel Florkin). Quelques pages de la botanique au pays de Liège aux 18e et 19e siècles: en hommage à Marcel Florkin (+1979) et à André Lawalrée (+2005). Nº 187 de Lejeunia: Nouvelle série. Ed. Les Editions de Lejeunia. 38 pp.

=== Taxa named after Lawalrée ===
- (Asteraceae) Taraxacum lawalreei Soest
- (Dryopteridaceae) Dryopteris × lawalreei Janch.
- (Orchidaceae) × Dactylodenia lawalreei P.Delforge & D.Tyteca
- (Ranunculaceae) Ranunculus lawalreei (Demarsin) Ericsson

== Sources ==
- Elmar Robbrecht (2006). André Lawalrée (Terwagne, 2 février 1921 - Bruxelles, 18 avril 2005). Bulletin des Séances de l'Académie Royale des Sciences d'Outre-Mer, Nouvelle Série, vol. 55,2, p. 203-207.
- Régine Fabri (2008). André Lawalrée (1921-2005): his work and life. André Lawalrée (1921-2005): L'homme au travers de son œuvre. Systematics and Geography of Plants 78 ( 1 ) : 3-26 (24)
- Régine Fabri (2012). Lawalrée, André, Gilles, Célestin, botaniste, chef de département au Jardin botanique national de Belgique, maître de conférences à l'Université catholique de Louvain, né à Terwagne le 2 février 1921, décédé à Uccle (Bruxelles) le 18 avril 2005. In : Nouvelle Biographie Nationale, Bruxelles, Académie Royale des Sciences, des Lettres et des Beaux-Arts de Belgique, vol. 11, p. 246-248.
