= Andrey A. Fedorov =

Soviet Russian biologist, botanist, taxonomist and phytogeographer

Andrey Aleksandrovich Fedorov
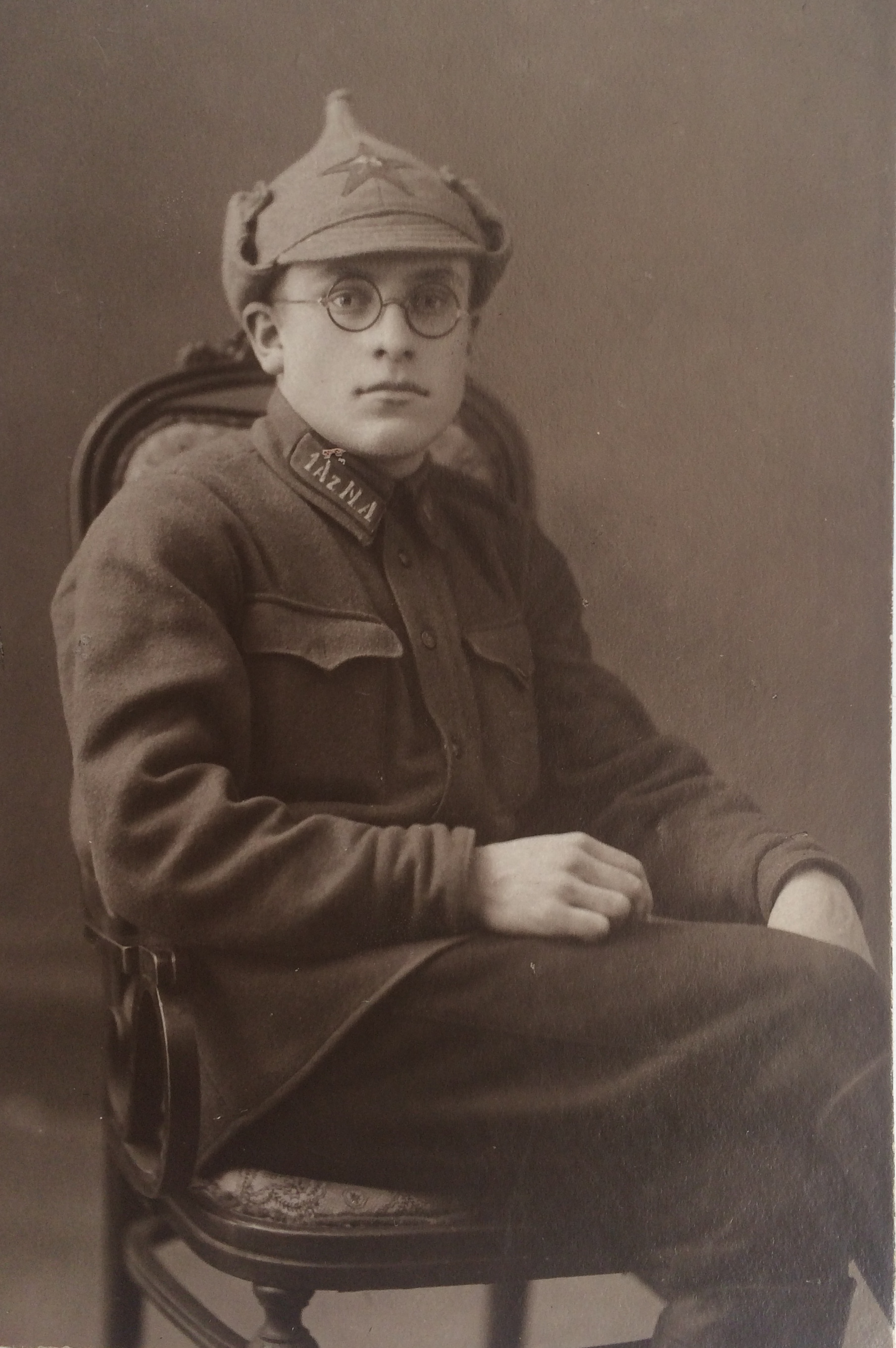
- 1931
- Born: 30 October [O.S. 17 October] 1908; Tver
- Died: 5 March 1987 (aged 78); Leningrad
- Known for: taxonomy, phytogeography
- Scientific career
- Fields: botany
- Author abbrev. (botany): Fed.

Andrey Aleksandrovich Fedorov (Russian: Андрей Александрович Фёдоров; 30 October [O.S. 17 October] 1908 – 5 March 1987) was a Soviet Russian biologist, botanist, taxonomist and phytogeographer, who was from 1970 a corresponding member of the Academy of Sciences of the USSR. He was the brother of the botanist Alexander Fedorov (1906–1982).

== Career ==
Andrey Fedorov was born in Tver, the son of a gardener. His higher education was at the Tver Institute of Education, in part at the same time as his brother, and he graduated in 1929. He worked until 1935 at the station in Sukhumi, a subsidiary of the Vavilov Institute of Plant Industry. From 1935 to 1945 he continued his research at the Armenian National Academy of Sciences (before 1943, Armenian subsidiary of the Academy of Sciences of the USSR). In 1945 he moved to Leningrad to work at the Komarov Botanical Institute where he spent the rest of his career. He directed the Laboratory there from 1963.

In 1955 and 1956, he took part in joint Sino-Soviet biological expedition to the province of Yunnan.

In 1955 he was a signatory of the "Letter of three hundred", addressed to the Politburo of the Central Committee of the Communist Party of the Soviet Union, which criticised the activities of Lysenko and made an overall assessment of the state of biology in the Soviet Union. The letter was drafted by a large group of Soviet scientists and led eventually to the resignation of Lysenko as president of All-Union Academy of Agricultural Sciences.

Andrey Fedorov was appointed in 1970 as a corresponding member of the Academy of Sciences of the USSR. His main work was devoted to the taxonomy of flowering plants, to the flora of the USSR (especially the Caucasus, to the European part of the USSR, Siberia and the republics of Central Asia), flora of other countries and to the history of the flora. Among the families studied by Fedorov, we can distinguish those of Campanulaceae and Primulaceae. He was also interested in phytogeography.

Fedorov was a regional adviser for the Soviet Union on the international Flora Europaea project, published in five volumes in 1964–1980. He was also co-author of The Flora of the USSR, international edition published in four volumes between 1964 and 1976, and co-editor of The Flora of the European part of the USSR (1974–1979).

He died 5 March 1987 in Leningrad and was buried at Serafimovskoe Cemetery, also in Leningrad.

== Honours ==
- Order of the Red Banner of Labour (twice)
- in 1991, botanist Alfred Kolakovski published Theodorovia, which is a monotypic genus of flowering plants from Iran and Turkey, belonging to the family Campanulaceae and named in honour of Andrey A. Fedorov.

== Selected publications ==
- Andrey Fedorov, История высокогорной флоры Кавказа в четвертичное время (The history of alpine flora of the Caucasus in the Quaternary) // Материалы по четвертичному периоду СССР (Materials on the Quaternary period in the USSR): collection Moscow, 1952, Т. 3.
- Andrey Fedorov and Moïsseï Kirpichnikov, Справочное пособие по систематике высших растений (Handbook on taxonomy of higher plants): vol. I: Сокращения, условные обозначения, географические названия ( Abbreviations, symbols, place names) / edited by B. K. Schischkin; Botanical Institute. Komarov Academy of Sciences. - Leningrad: Publishing House of the USSR Academy of Sciences, 1954. - 110 p.
- Andrey Fedorov, O флористических связях Восточной Азии с Кавказом (On the floristic links between East Asia and the Caucasus) // Материалы по истории флоры и растительности СССР (Materials on the history of the flora and vegetation of the USSR), Moscow-Leningrad, 1958, Т. 3.
- Andrey Fedorov, Диптерокарповый экваториальный влажнотропический лес Цейлона (The tropical rain forest of Dipterocarpaceae in Ceylon) // Тр. Моск. общества испытателей природы. Отдел биологический. (Proceedings of the Moscow Society of Naturalists, Department of Biology). - 1960. - T. 3.
- A. L. Takhtajan and Andrey Fedorov, Флора Еревана (The flora of Yerevan), Leningrad, Nauka, 1972, 396 pages.
- Определитель высших растений Крыма (Key to the higher plants of the Crimea) / edited by Andrey Fedorov, Léningrad, Nauka, 1981, 380 pages.
- Andrey Fedorov, Семейство охновые (Ochnaceae). Семейство чайные (Theaceae). Семейство тетрамеристовые (Tetrameristaceae). Семейство боннетовые (Bonnetiaceae). Семейство диптерокарповые (Dipterocarpaceae) (The families Ochnaceae; Theaceae; Tetrameristaceae; Bonnetiaceae; Dipterocarpaceae) // Жизнь растений (The life of plants), in six volumes. / edited A. L. Takhtajan, Moscow, Prosvechtchenie, 1981. — Т. 5. part. 2. Цветковые растения (Flowering plants). / ed. A. L. Takhtajan, pp. 18–19, 21—25, 27, 123—126; 512 pages

=== Works translated into English ===
Books:

- 2000. Flora of Russia: v. 3: The European Part and Bordering Regions: vol. 3. Ed. Taylor & Francis. 370 pp. ISBN 90-5410-753-7
- 2001a. Flora of Russia: v. 4: The European Part and Bordering Regions: vol. 4. Ed. Taylor & Francis. 532 pp. ISBN 90-5410-754-5
- 2001b. Flora of Russia: v. 5: The European Part and Bordering Regions: vol. 5. Ed. CRC Press. 532 pp. ISBN 90-5410-755-3
- 2002a. Flora of Russia: The European Part and Bordering Regions 6. Ed. Taylor & Francis. 992 pp. ISBN 90-5410-756-1
- 2002. Flora of Russia: The European Part and Bordering Regions vol. 7. Ed. Taylor & Francis. 320 pp. ISBN 90-5410-757-X
- 2003. Flora of Russia: Vol. 8: The European Part and Bordering Regions: vol. 8. Ed. Taylor & Francis. 704 pp. ISBN 90-5410-758-8

Articles:

- Fedorov A. A. 1966. The structure of the tropical rain forest and speciation in the humid tropics. Journal of Ecology 54: 1-11
- Fedorov, A. A. [ed.] 1969. Chromosome numbers of flowering plants. Komarov Botanical Institute, Academy of Sciences, URSS, Léningrad
