= Jalas (surname) =

Jalas is a Finnish surname. Notable people with the surname include:

- Jaakko Jalas (1920–1999), Finnish botanist
  - Jalas, systematist citation of this person
- Jussi Jalas (1908–1985), Finnish conductor and composer
