= Alan Burges =

Australian botanist (1911–2002)

Norman Alan Burges CBE (5 August 1911 – 4 October 2002), was an Australian botanist who became the first vice-chancellor of the New University of Ulster in Coleraine, Northern Ireland.

== Life ==
He was born 5 August 1911, in East Maitland, New South Wales, and took his first degree and MSc at the University of Sydney, then studied for his PhD in mycology at Emmanuel College, Cambridge. After a short period as a Research Fellow at Emmanuel, at the outbreak of war in 1939 he joined the Royal Air Force serving in Bomber Command.

After the war he returned to Australia and in 1947 became professor of botany at the University of Sydney, and later dean of the Faculty of Science and a Fellow of Senate there. he also acted as the honorary general secretary of the Australian and New Zealand Association for the Advancement of Science during that period.

In 1952 he returned to England to take the post of professor of botany (a chair endowed by and named after Holbrook Gaskell) at the University of Liverpool Subsequently he became acting vice-chancellor (1964–5) and pro-vice chancellor (1965–66) there. He served as president of the British Ecological Society 1958-1959 He was one of the four long-term co-editors of Flora Europaea Project from 1956.

In 1966 he was appointed as the first vice-chancellor of the New University of Ulster in Coleraine, Northern Ireland, where he remained until retirement in 1976.

Following retirement he took an active part in Ulster cultural affairs, for example as chairman, of the Ulster American Folk Park (1975–88) and of the Northern Ireland Committee of the National Trust (1978–81).

He was appointed CBE in 1980.

== Publications ==
- Burges, Alan (1958). Micro-Organisms in the Soil. Hutchinson.
- Burges, Alan; Raw, Frank (1967). Soil Biology. Academic Press.

== Personal life ==
In 1940 he married Florence Evelyn Moulton; they had three daughters, Judith, Jennifer and Anne. They also had a son Andrew who died as a young child. Alan died on 4 October 2002.
