= Libertiella =

Scientific classification
- Kingdom: Fungi
- Division: Ascomycota
- Class: incertae sedis
- Order: incertae sedis
- Family: incertae sedis
- Genus: Libertiella; Speg. & Roum. (1880)

Type species
- Libertiella malmedyensis Speg. & Roum. (1880)

Synonyms
- Nicholsoniella O.Kuntze (1891); Shecutia Nieuwland (1916)

Genus of fungi

Libertiella is a genus of lichenicolous (lichen-dwelling) fungi of uncertain classification in the Ascomycota. The species of this genus are found in Europe.

The genus name Libertiella honours Marie-Anne Libert, (1782-1865), a Belgian botanist and mycologist.

The genus was circumscribed by Carlos Luis Spegazzini and Casimir Roumeguère in Rev. Mycol. (Toulouse) vol.2 on pages 8-9, 14-15 and 97 in 1880.

== Species ==
- Libertiella fennica Alstrup (1997)
- Libertiella leprariae Etayo & Diederich (1995)
- Libertiella lignicola Höhn. (1902)
- Libertiella malmedyensis Speg. & Roum. (1880)
- Libertiella obscurior K.Gerber (1931)
- Libertiella quercicola Woron. (1917)
- Libertiella xanthoriae Keissl. (1925)

== See also ==
- List of Ascomycota genera incertae sedis
