= Boris Fedtschenko =

Russian botanist (1872–1947)

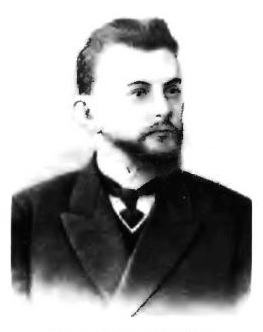
- Born: Boris Alexeevich Fedtschenko; 27 December 1872; Leipzig, Kingdom of Saxony
- Died: 29 September 1947 (aged 74); Leningrad, Soviet Union
- Occupations: Plant pathologist, botanist

Boris Alexeevich Fedtschenko (27 December 1872 – 29 September 1947) was a Russian plant pathologist and botanist. He is primarily known for his work on various regions of Russia, especially the Caucasus, Siberia and Asiatic Russia. He was also head botanist at the Saint Petersburg Botanical Garden.

== Biography ==
Boris Fedtschenko was the son of botanists Olga Fedtschenko and Alexei Pavlovich Fedchenko. He was born in Leipzig, while his parents were on an expedition in Western Europe. In 1873, eight months after he was born, Alexei was killed in a climbing accident on Mont Blanc.

Olga studied natural sciences at the University of Moscow. Between 1891 and 1892, she undertook the first of many trips with her son, going first to the Ural Mountains. In the summer of 1893, they explored the Crimea twice, 17 to 28 June, then July 29 to August 1. They made a large circular botanical voyage around the Crimean Mountains and collected in the Sevastopol area.

In 1894, they explored Transcaucasia. In 1897, they studied the flora of the western Tian Mountains. Between 1898 and 1899, Fedtschenko became a botanist at the Imperial Botanic Garden in St Petersburg. In 1901, Olga and Boris went on a botanical expedition in the Pamir Mountain range. Later they published Materiaux pour la flore du Caucase (1901), Flora of the Pamirs (1901) and Conspectus Florae Turkestanicae (1913), which covered 4145 species.

Between 1899 and 1904, their large collections (including 700+ specimens from SW Crimea) were carefully studied and completely reflected in a series of papers. The plant collection was later given to the Botanic Garden, and is now one of its most notable collections.

By 1902, he was the head of the botanic garden's herbarium. This also meant he was responsible for editing the garden's periodical (Bulletin of the Imperial Institute), which was started in 1919. It conducted fieldwork in Central Asia during the 1920s, which added species information to the Flora SSSR project.

He also published several works in Trudy Imp. S.-Peterburgsk. Bot. Sada (Proceedings of the St.Petersburg Botanical Garden), including Eritrichium pamiricum in 1903, based on the expeditions.

In 1904, he published Novitae florae Turkestanciae, which was also translated into German in 1914 - Übersicht sämtlicher bis jetzt für den Russischen Turkestan.

In 1908, he stopped the publication of the botanic garden's journal Botanicheskij Zhurnal (Ботаническiй Журналъ), which had been published from 1906 to 1908. With the help of lichenologist, algologist and mycologist Alexandr Alexandrovich Elenkin and botanist Alexander Flyorov, Fedtschenko started a new independent journal called Journal Russe de Botanique (Русскій ботаническiй журналъ). It published issues eight times a year, until 1915 when World War 1 started and financial cutbacks had to be made.

Between 1908 and 1910, Fedtschenko and Flyorov published Flora Evropejskoj Rossii (Flora of the European Part of Russia), which contained 3,542 new species. This large piece of work also had contributions from other botanists.

In 1907, 1908 and 1910, they also published the three-part volume Okskaya Flora (Flora of the Oka).

After they published the Flora volumes, they were criticized by several botanists including, F.S. Nenyukov, N.I. Kusnezov and Eduard Regel, due to its very short descriptions. But this made the books very compact and portable, and therefore very widely used.

In 1910 and 1915, Boris and his mother (now aged 70), returned to Turkestan for more plant hunting expeditions. His exsiccata series Flora Turkestanica exsiccata was issued between 1915 and 1917. Plant material collected by Fedtschenko in the Samarkand Region and Bukhara Region was distributed by him under the title Iter Samarcandense Bucharicum 1913 and by Joseph Friedrich Nicolaus Bornmüller under the title Plantae Turkestanicae in itinere B. A. Fedtschenko per reg. Samarkand et domin. Buchara lectae a. 1913.

In 1930, he attended the Fifth International Botanical Congress held at the Imperial Institute, in London. He attended the International Congress of Tropical Agriculture and Colonial Development (discussing cotton in Egypt).

Boris collaborated with many institutions, including Berlin Botanical Garden and Botanical Garden of Geneva.

Also in 1930, Fedtschenko started organising botanists around Russia to survey plants and report their findings to create a national plant survey.

In 1931, the Imperial Botanic Garden and Imperial Botanical Museum were merged to create the Komarov Botanical Institute. Vladimir Komarov was head of the museum and, as such, outranked Fedtschenko. He then took over responsibility for the Flora SSSR project and became its editor-in-chief. Eventually the thirty-volume project was completed and published in 1964, after Fedtschenko had died in 1947. The volumes covered some 17,500 plant species, and represented a huge step forwards for Russian botany.

Boris Fedtschenko died on 29 September 1947 in Leningrad (now called St Petersburg).

The specific epithet fedtschenkoi honors botanist Boris Fedtschenko. The epithet fedtschenkoanus also refers to him, but fedtschenkoi refers to his father's and mother's work.

Significant other works of the 1900s include:

- Plantea assiae mediea by Olga Fedtschenko and B. Fedtschenko (1906-1916)
- Jakutskaja flora (1907) by B. Fedtschenko
- Flora Evropejskoj Rossii (1908-1910) by B. Fedtschenko and Alexandr F. Flyorov
- Flora Asiatskoj Rossii (1912-1924) by B. Fedtschenko and Alexandr F. Flyorov
- Flora Rossiae Austro-orientalis (1927-1936, index in 1938) by B. Fedtschenko and Boris K. Schischkin

He is the botanical author of many species of plant and tree, including Abies sibirica var. semenovii (1899), Echinops tschimganicus(1911), Gypsophila bucharica(1911), Nephrodium amurense (1918), and Saussurea turgaiensis (1910).

He is mentioned in D.J. Mabberley's portable plant books of 1997.

== Other sources ==
- S.G. Shetler, 1967, The Komarov Botanical Institute
- Brummitt, R.K. & Powell, C.E., Authors Pl. Names (1992): page196
- Jackson, B.D., Bull. Misc. Inform. Kew (1901): page22
- Lanjouw, J. & Stafleu, F.A., Index Herb. Coll. E-H (1957): page192
