= Choix des plus belles fleurs =

1827 book of art by Pierre-Joseph Redouté

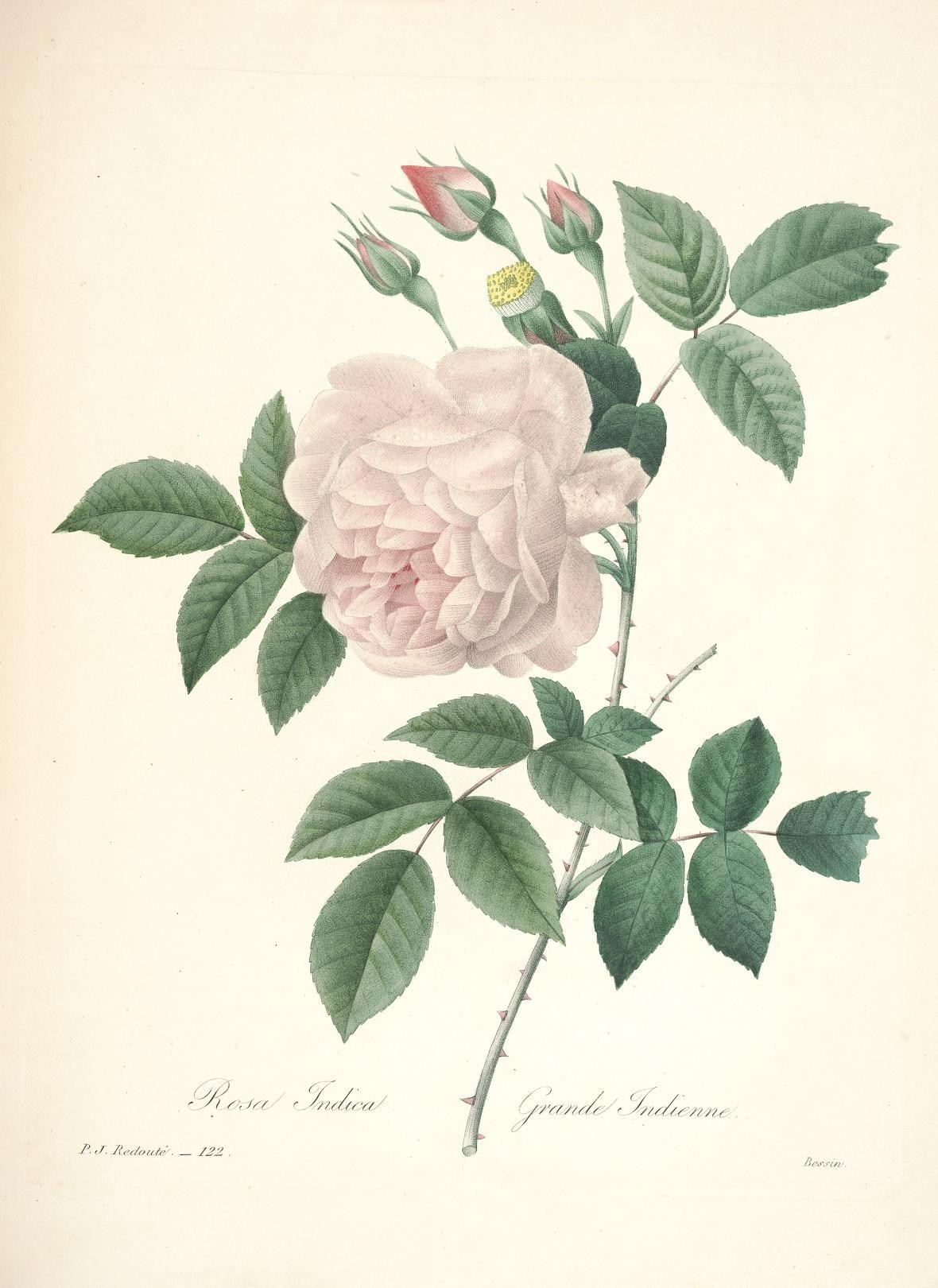
- Author: Pierre-Joseph Redouté
- Language: French
- Publisher: Ernest Panckoucke, Paris
- Publication date: 1827
- Publication place: France

Choix des plus belles fleurs (The most beautiful flowers) is a book of watercolors by the Belgian artist Pierre-Joseph Redouté. It has 144 color pictures reproduced by copperplates.

== Description ==
The full title in French is Choix des plus belles fleurs et de quelques branches des plus beaux fruits: Dédié à LL. AA. RR. les princesses Louise et Marie d'Orléans (1827). A folio edition was printed with color pages in Paris in 1827.

From May 1827 to June 1833 144 special pages were printed with pictures. The work consisted of 36 parts, each containing four pictures of flowers, flowering trees or fruits.

Redouté worked for half a century as an art teacher of French queens and princesses. He dedicated the book of beautiful flowers and fruits to his pupils Louise and Princess Marie of Orléans.

== Flowers and Fruit ==
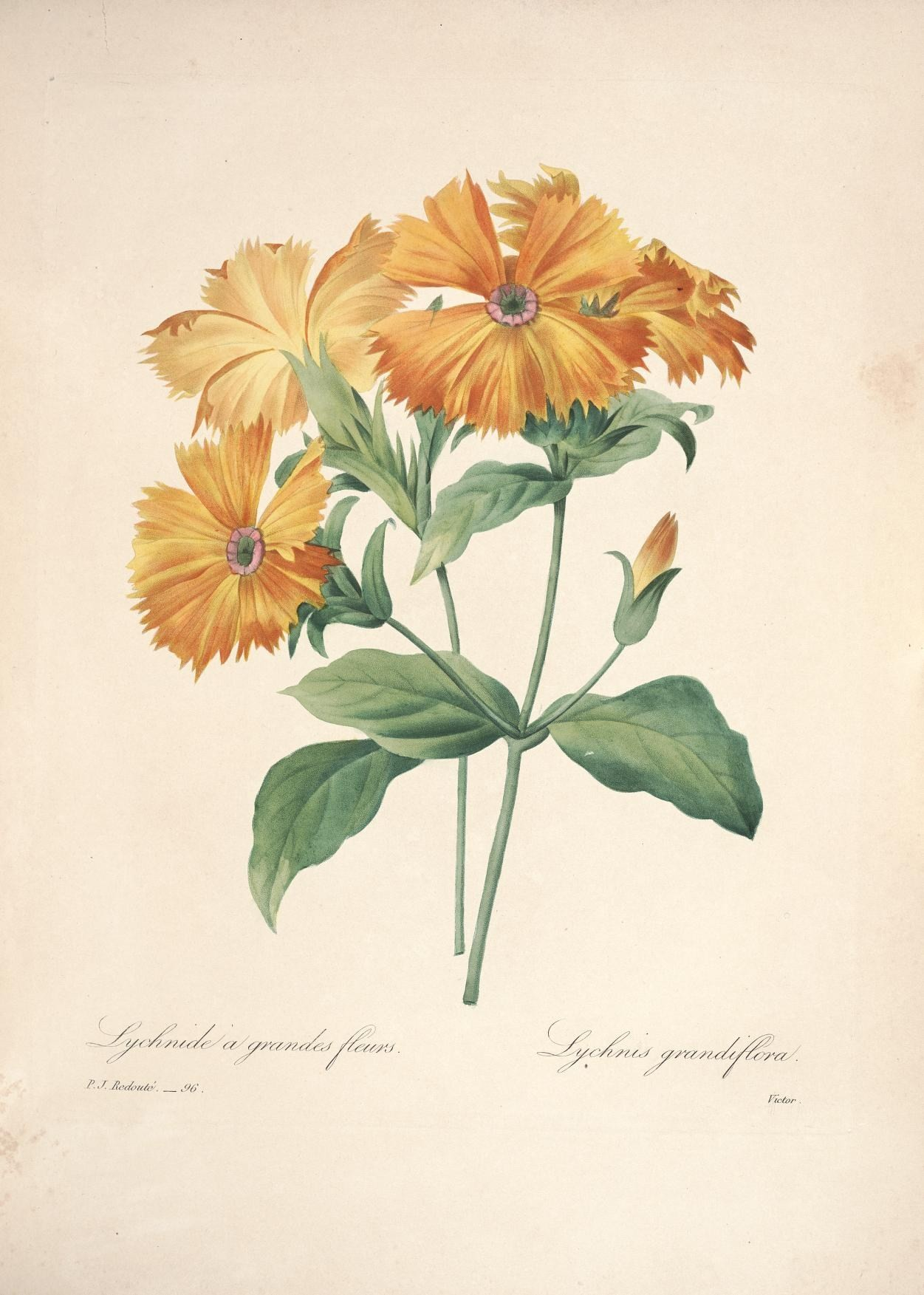

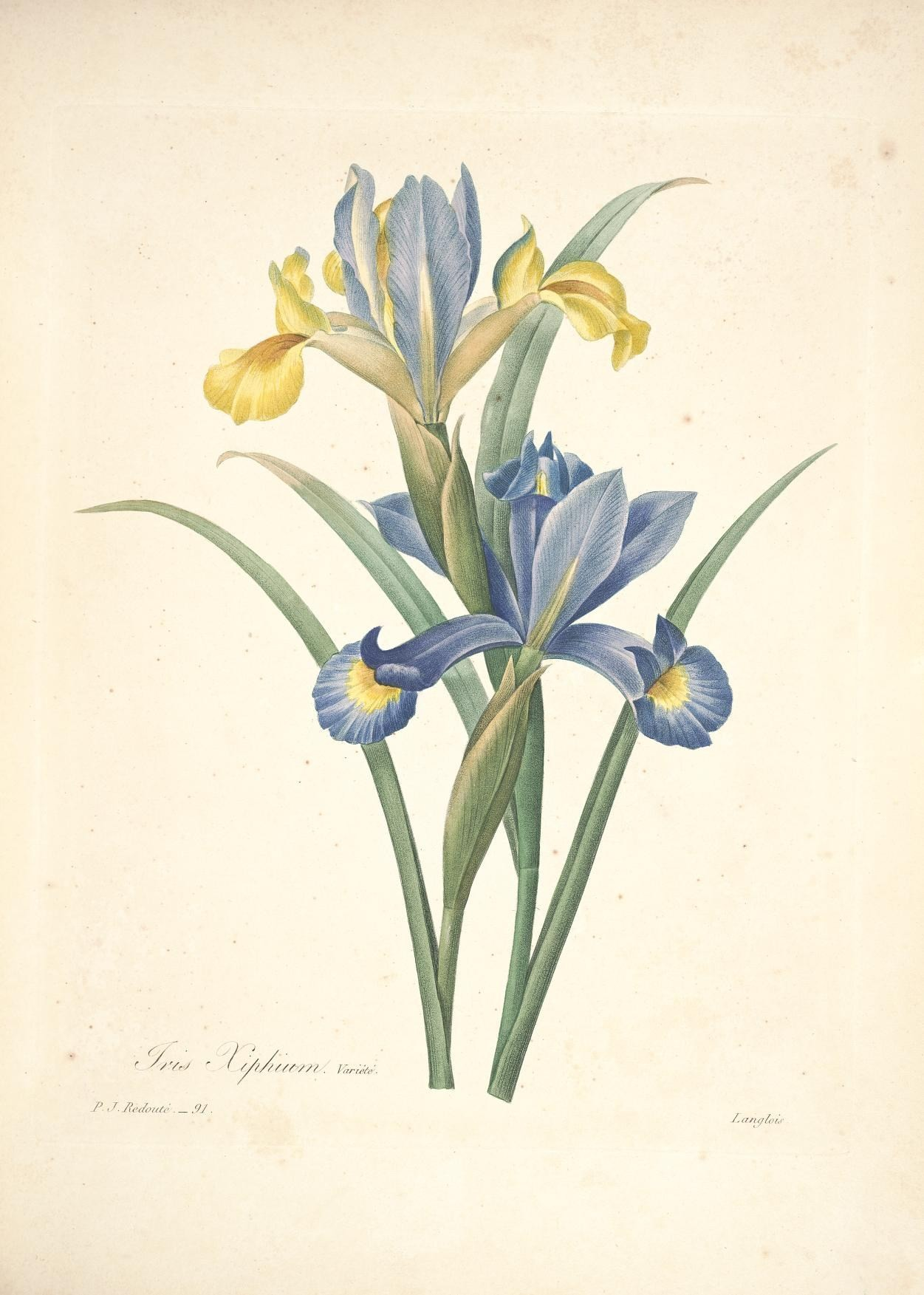

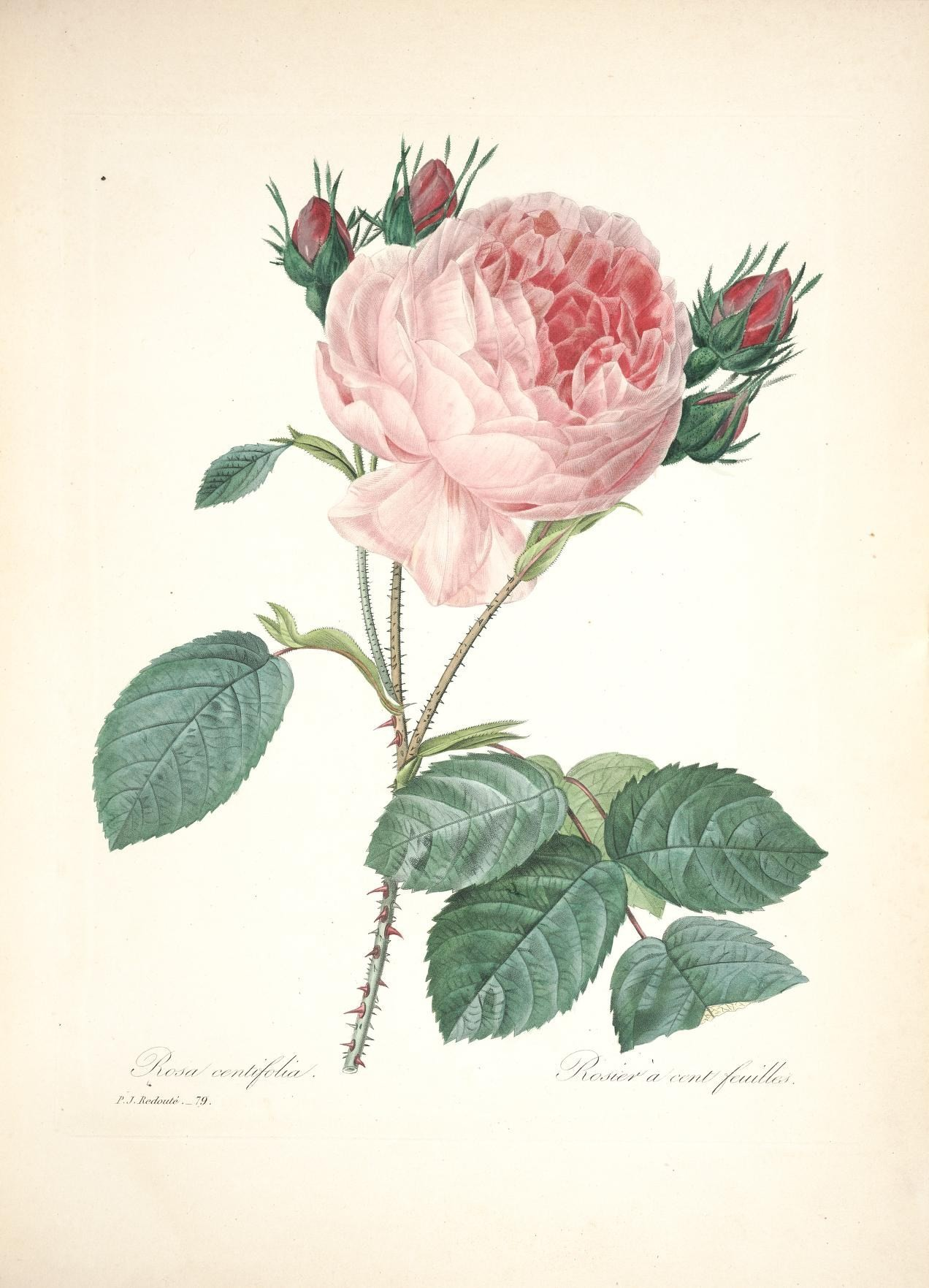

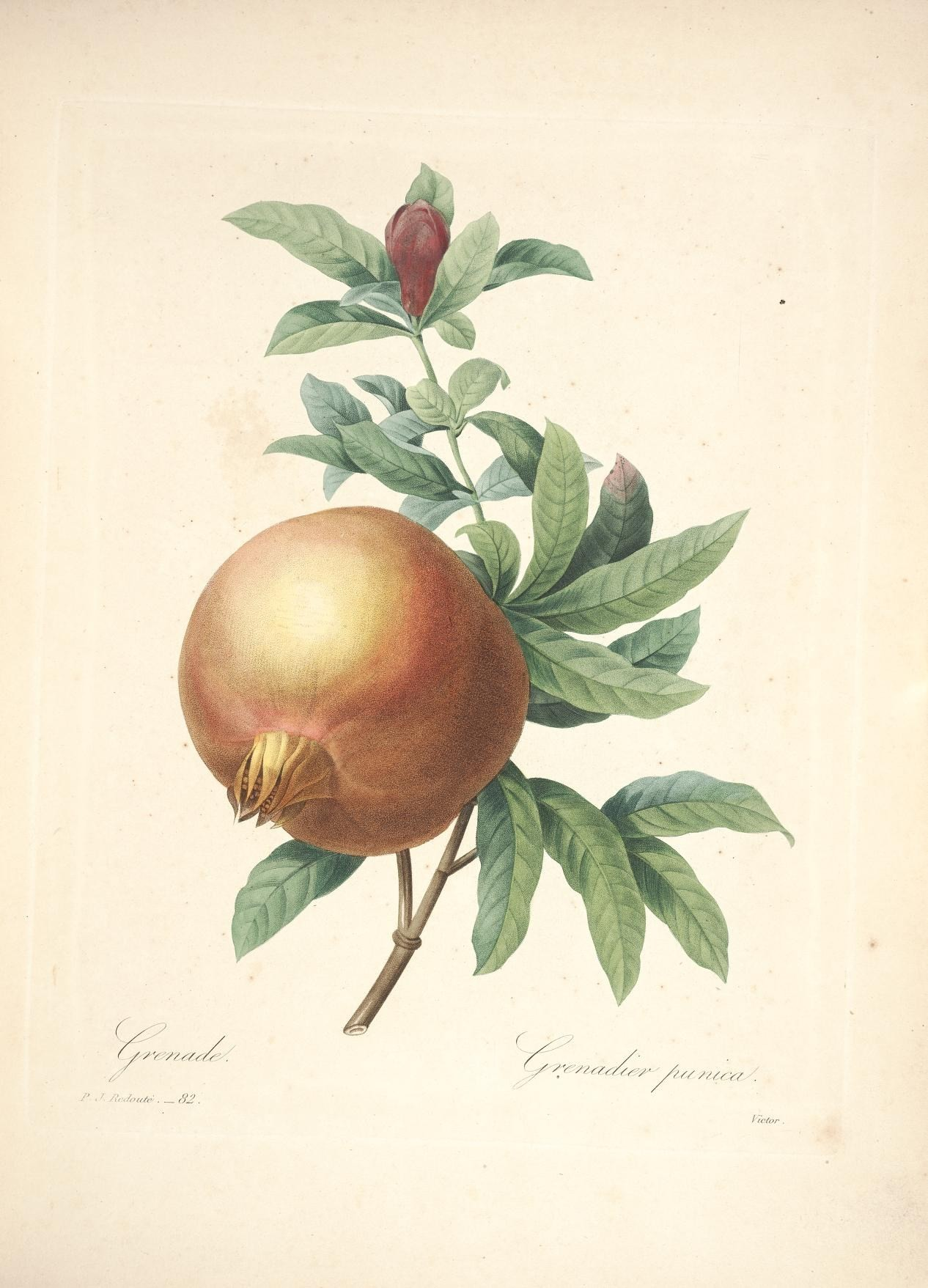

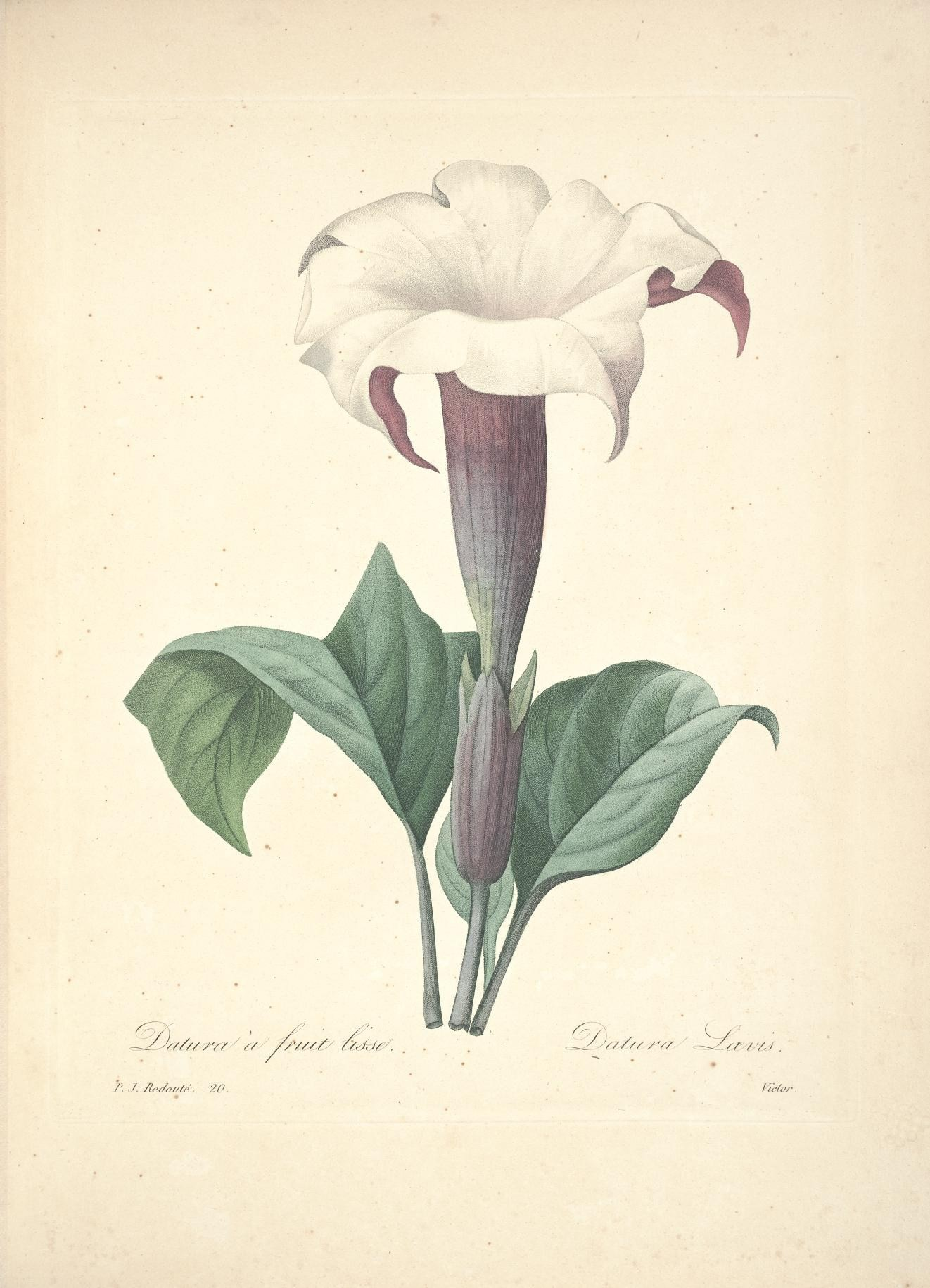

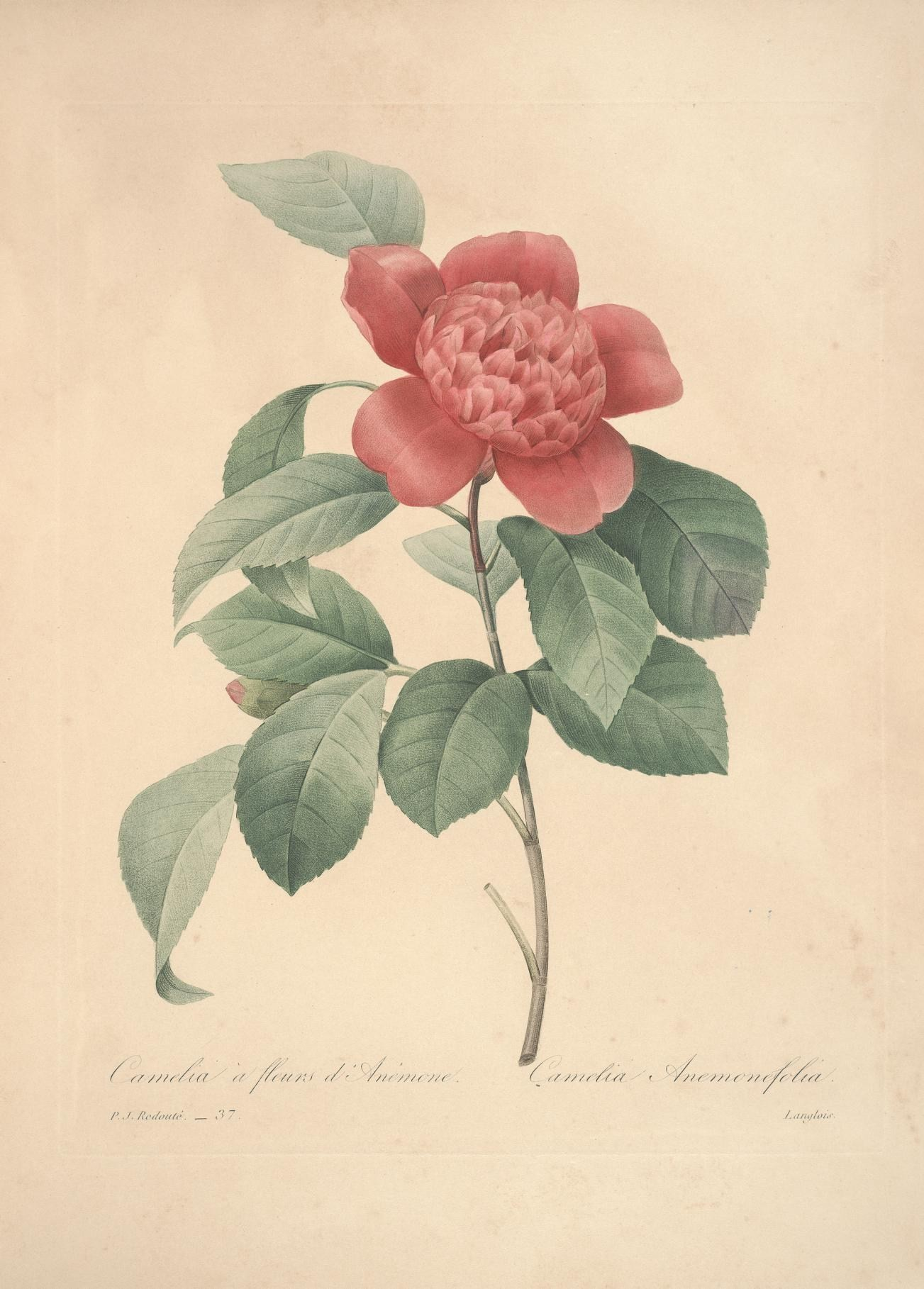

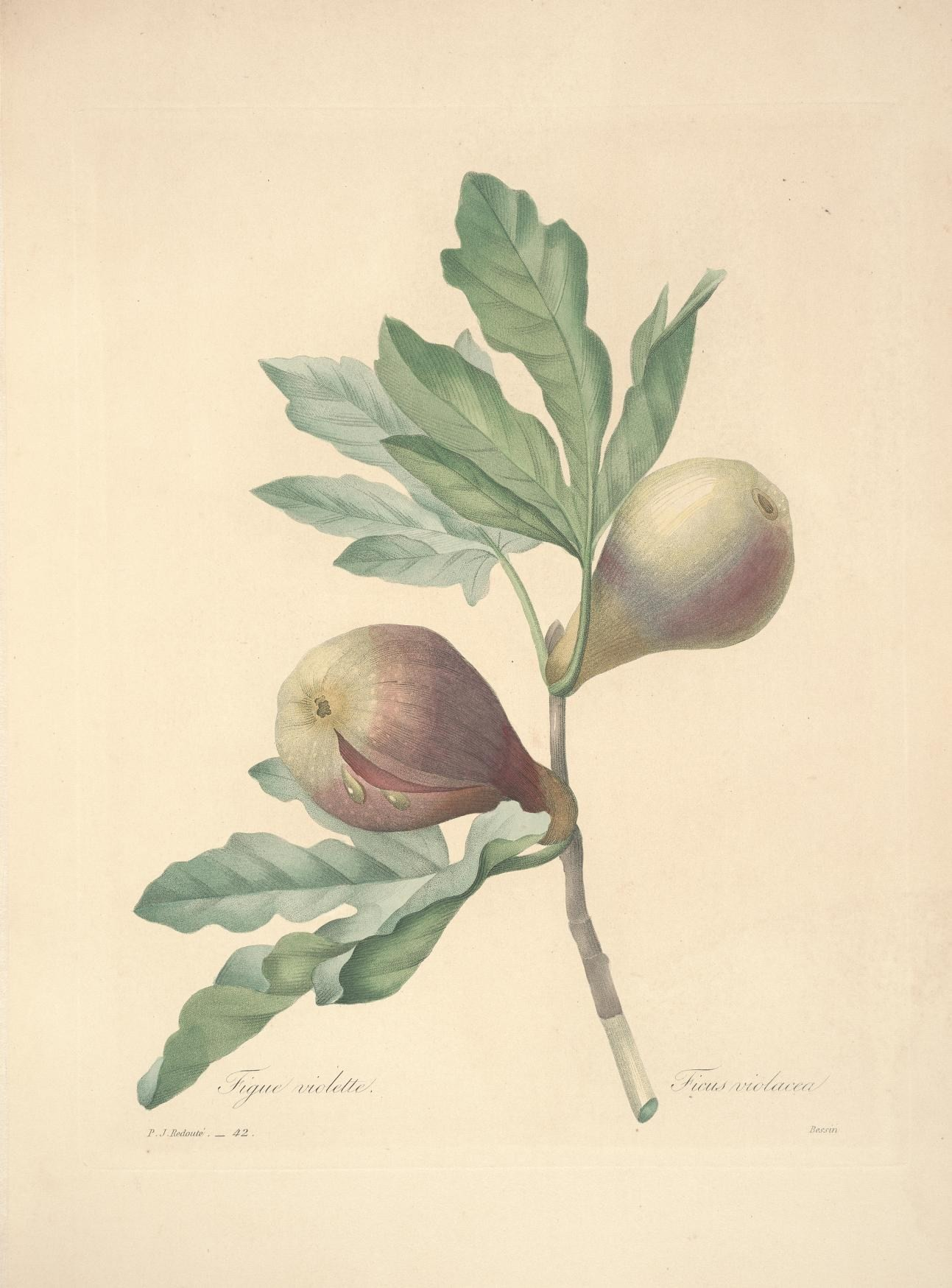

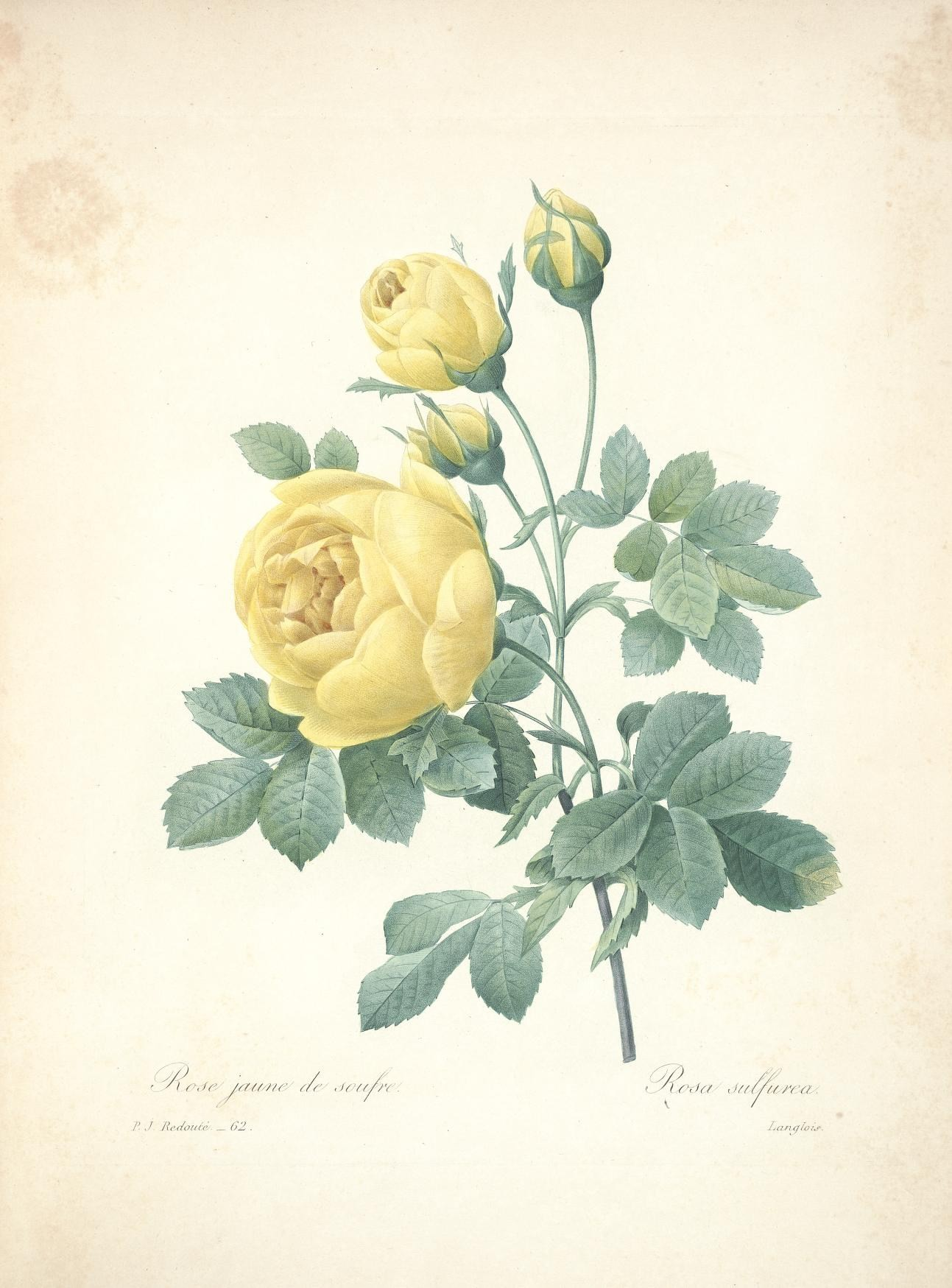

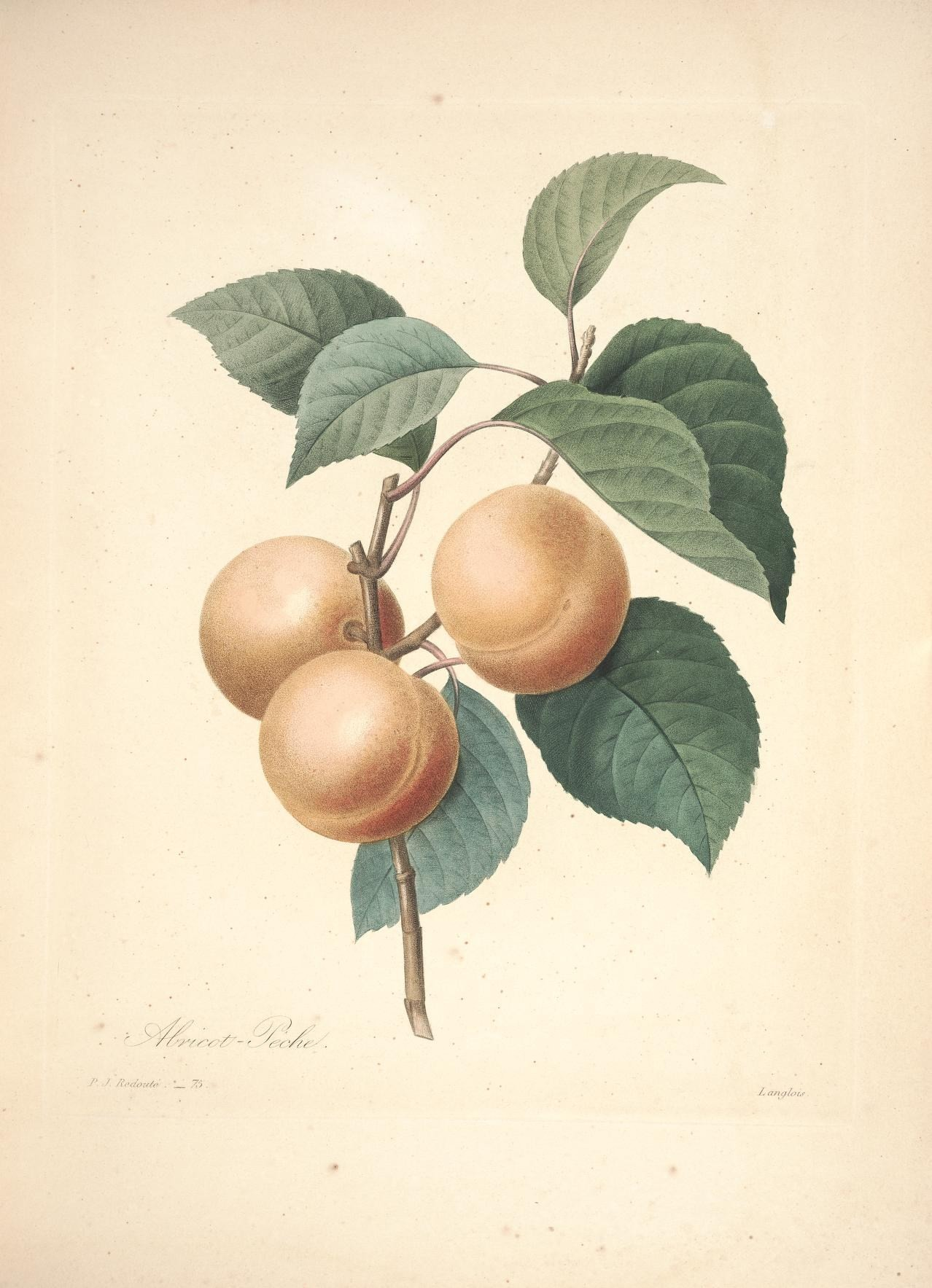

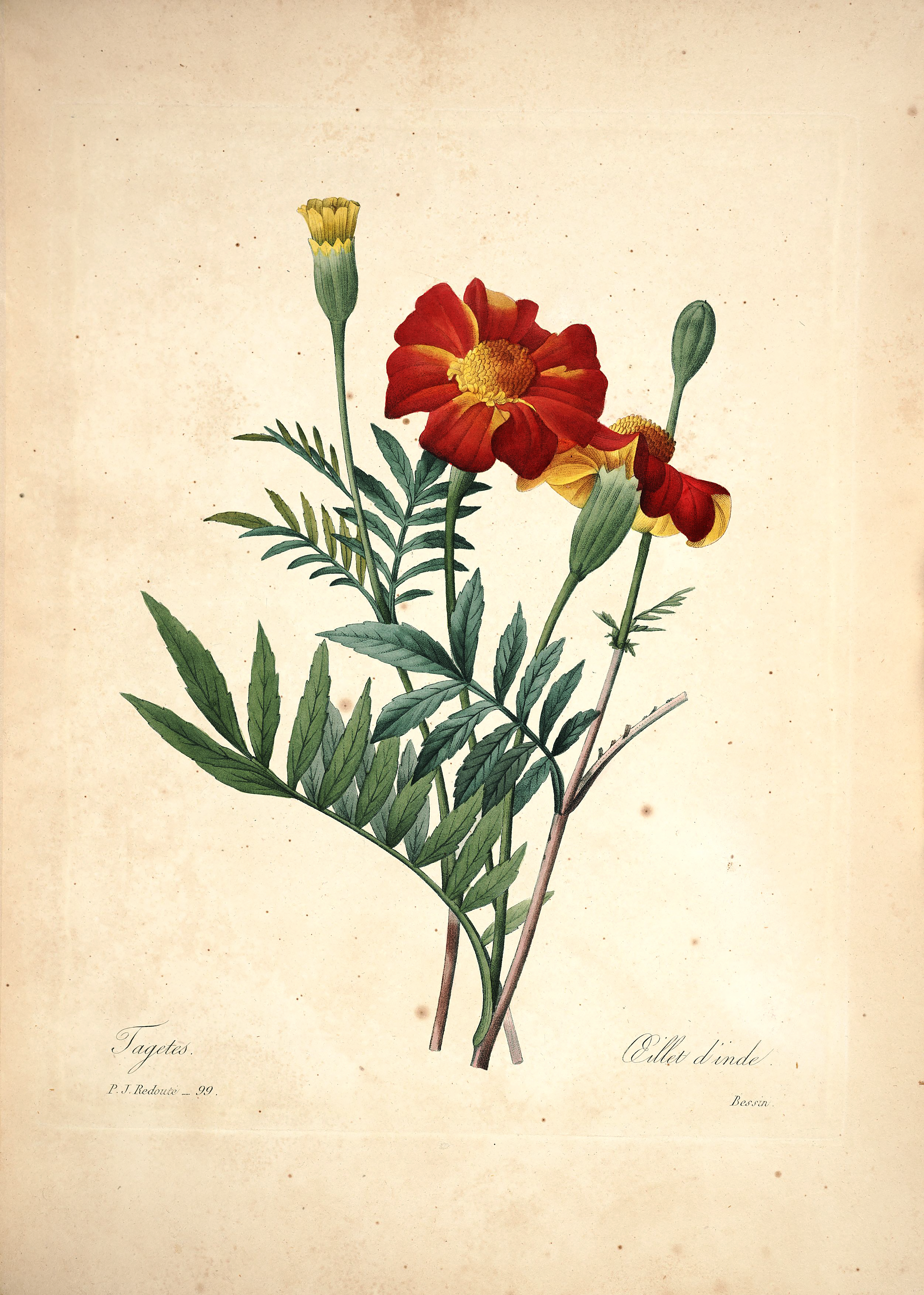

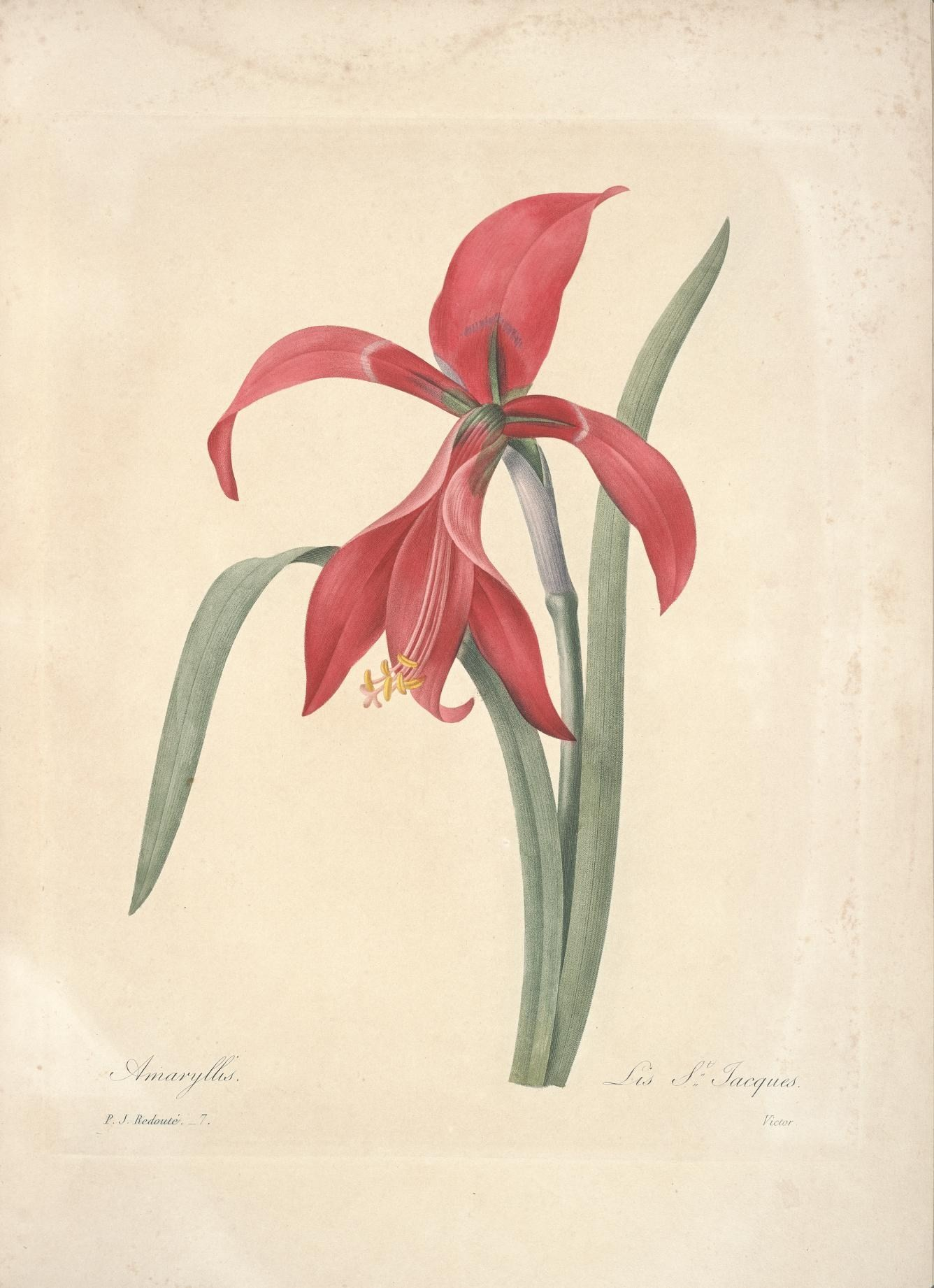

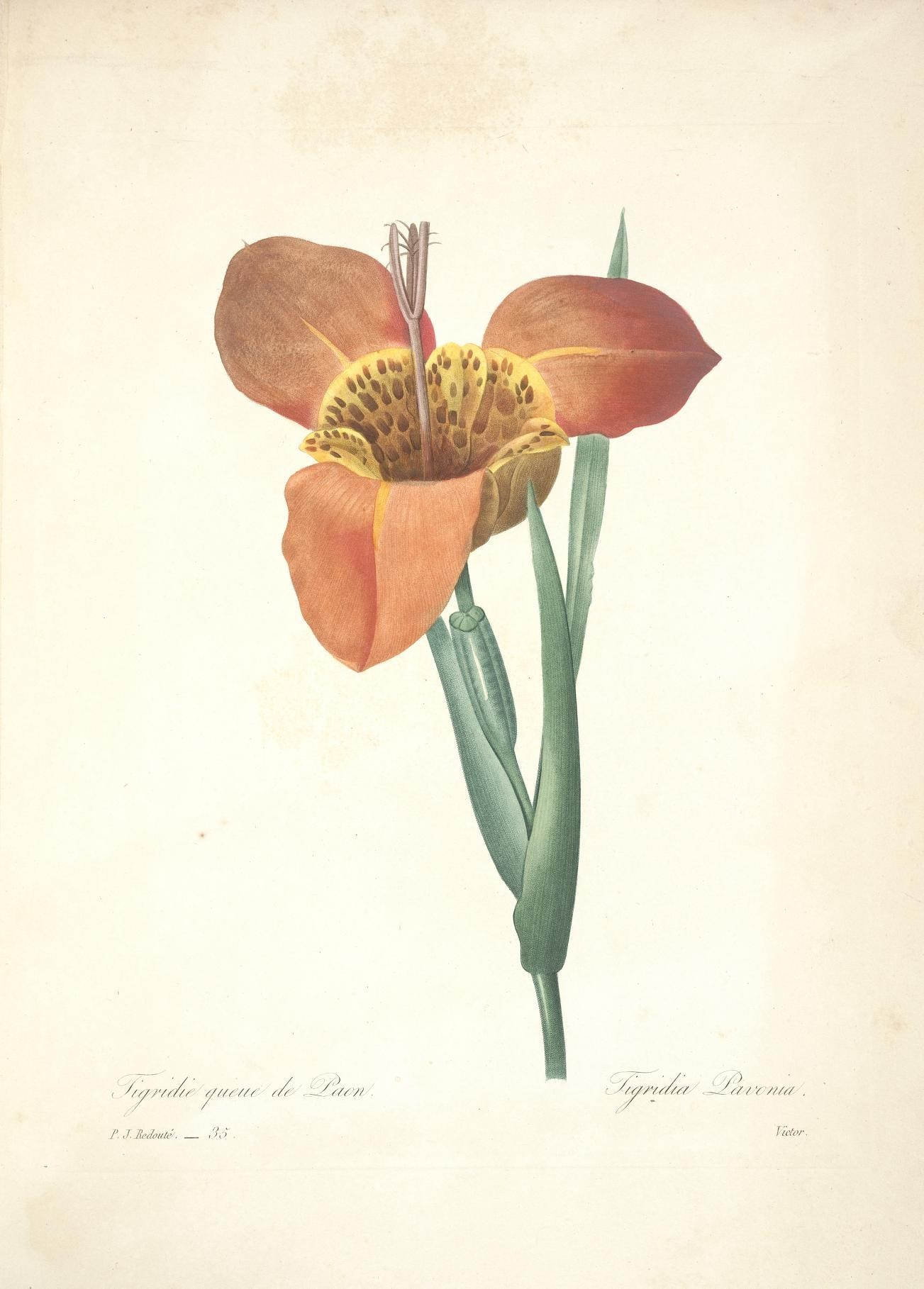
