= Marie-Anne Libert =

Belgian botanist

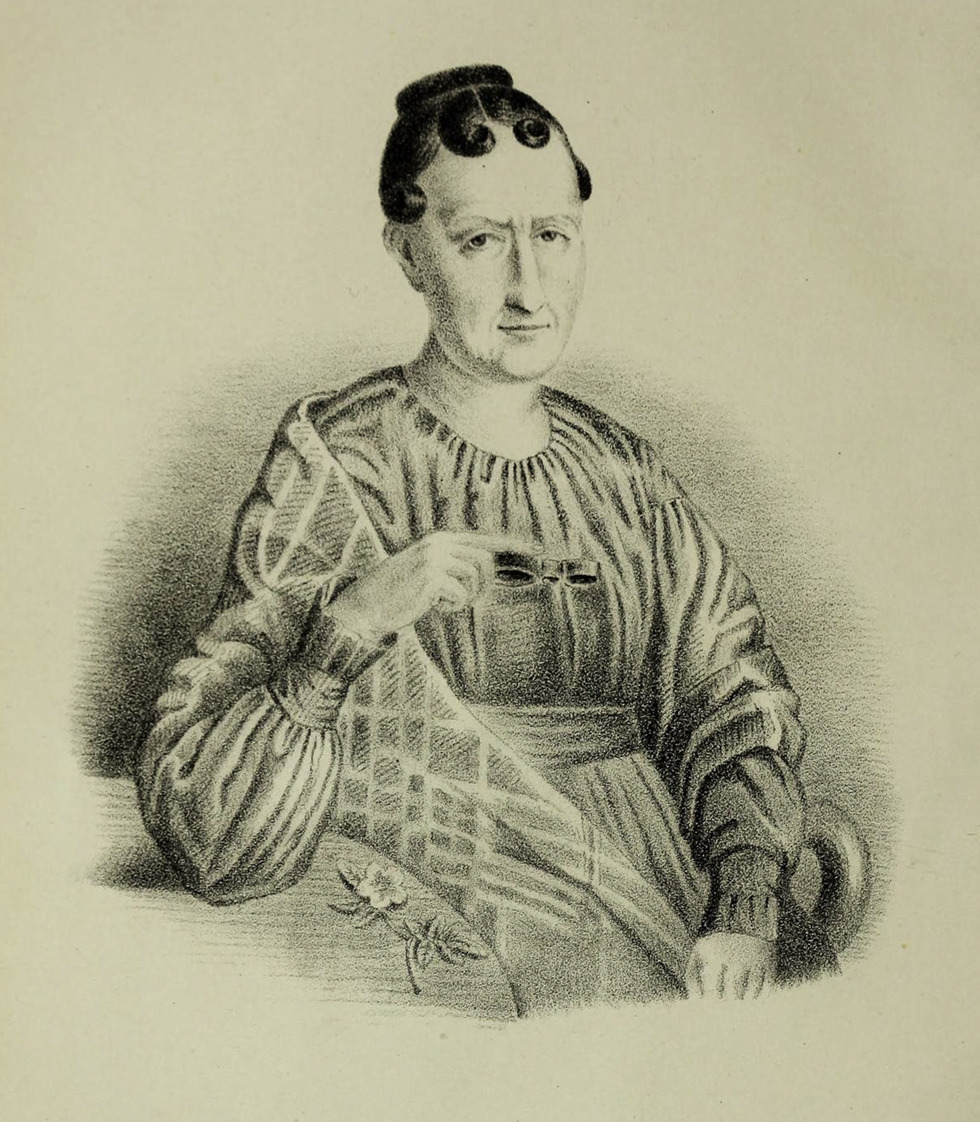
- Born: 7 April 1782; Malmedy, Holy Roman Empire
- Died: 14 January 1865 (aged 82); Malmedy, Belgium
- Scientific career
- Fields: Botany, mycology, plant pathology

Marie-Anne Libert (born 7 April 1782 in Malmedy, province of Liège, died 14 January 1865 in Malmedy) was a Belgian botanist and mycologist. She was one of the first women plant pathologists. She is sometimes referred to as "Anne-Marie Libert".

== Early life ==
Marie-Anne Libert was born in Malmedy in April 1782, twelfth of the thirteen children of Henri-Joseph Libert and his wife Marie-Jeanne-Bernadine Libert (née Dubois). The parents, educated members of the middle class who ran a tanning business, recognised her intellectual potential. She was initially a pupil of the Sépulcrines of Malmedy. At the age of eleven her parents sent her to stay in Prüm in Germany to learn German and the violin, both of which she quickly mastered. Her father recognised his daughter's emerging interest in the exact sciences and taught her algebra and geometry, so that she could follow him into the business. She was enthusiastic and pushed the education well beyond the needs of commerce.

At an age when some girls only wanted to amuse themselves, Marie-Anne Libert was motivated by a thirst for knowledge: everything interested her, she wanted to know everything. Nature drew her in particular; she spent long hours walking in the area of Malmedy, particularly in the High Fens. She observed, gathered many minerals and plants then identified them in her father's office, cataloguing and classifying them. As most reference works were written in Latin, she began to teach herself Latin.

== Botany and mycology ==
Her work in botany, or more precisely in cryptogams, of an undeniable scientific rigour, earned her an international reputation. She corresponded with scientists in Belgium and elsewhere. She also collaborated for a time with Dr. Lejeune of Verviers, who was preparing a catalogue of the plants of the Department of Ourthe. Lejeune introduced Libert to the Swiss botanist Augustin Pyramus de Candolle, who encouraged her to work on cryptogamic flora. Libert's later produced a cryptogamic flora of the Ardennes.

She was one of the first to identify the organism responsible for the "late blight" disease of the potato, which she named Botrytis vastatrix Lib. and of which she gave a detailed description in a report written in August 1845. The German mycologist Anton de Bary built on this discovery, among other work, when he showed in 1876 that the oomycete, Phytophthora infestans as he renamed it, was the cause of late blight, and not the consequence as was still believed at the time.

She also described several plant pathogenic Ascomycetes, including Alternaria cheiranthi (Lib.) PC Bolle (basionym: Helminthosporium cheiranthi Lib.) a pathogen of wallflower, and Fusarium coeruleum Lib. ex Sacc., the causative agent of dry rot of potato. In total, she described over 200 new taxa.

== Other interests ==
The study of ancient languages had directed her attention towards archaeology. In the last years of her life, when her age no longer allowed her to move around the countryside easily, she devoted considerable time to the history of the Principality of Stavelot-Malmedy. She gave to history and archeology the same scientific rigour as to her botanical studies, using all available sources.

In addition to her herbarium, she formed a remarkable collection of pearls obtained from large pearl mussels found in abundance in the river Amblève and its tributaries. She also assembled a large collection of coins.

This intense scientific activity was no obstacle to her involvement in the family business. She had the same determination as in her research, the same desire to do well. With her brothers, she was able to make a large extension to the small tannery which they had inherited from their parents. After a short illness, Marie-Anne Libert died in Malmedy on 14 January 1865.

== Honours ==
The taxa Libertia (a genus in the family Iridaceae), as well as Asterolibertia, Libertiella and Myxolibertella (genera of ascomycete fungi), were all named after her.

The "Cercle naturaliste de la région de Malmedy", founded in 1951, which later became "Cercle Royal Marie-Anne Libert", took its name in her honour. In 1965, the centenary of her death, a stele decorated with a medallion bearing her likeness was erected in the Tanneries Park (Parc Marie-Anne Libert) in Malmedy. A street in Malmedy (Rue Marie-Anne Libert) was named after her in 1925.

In 1820 she became as associate member of the Société Linnéenne de Paris (Linnean Society of Paris), and Emperor Friedrich-Wilhelm III awarded her a gold medal of merit. She was the first woman invited to join the Société Royale de Botanique de Belgique in 1862.

== Publications ==
Libert M-A (1813). Cryptogamie, In Flore des environs de Spa … vol. 2 (ALS Lejeune). Chez Duvivier, Liège, Belgium: 272–285.
Libert M-A (1820). Sur un genre nouveau de'Hépatiques, Lejeunia. Annales Générales des Sciences Physiques 6: 372–374.
Libert M-A (1827a). Mémoires sur des cryptogames observées aux environs de Malmedy. Secrétariat de la Société Linnéenne, Paris, France [preprint of Libert (1827b) and (1827c) combined, TL-2 4496].
Libert M-A (1827b). Illustration du genre Inoconia, dans la famille des Algues. Mémoires de la Société Linnéenne de Paris 5: 402–403. [Some details from Libert's description of Inoconia are reproduced by Du Mortier (1865)]
Libert M-A (1827c). Observations sur le genre Asteroma, et description de deux espèces appartenant à ce genre. Mémoires de la Société Linnéenne de Paris 5: 404–406.
Libert M-A (1829). Description d'un nouveau genre de champignons nommé Desmazierella. Annales des Sciences Naturelles 17: 82–83.
Libert M-A (1829–1830). Mémoire concernant les plantes cryptogames qui peuvent être réunies sous le nom d'Ascoxylacei. Mémoires de la Société Royale des Sciences, de l'Agriculture et des Arts de Lille: 174–176.
Libert M-A (1830–1837). Plantae cryptogamicae quas in Arduenna collegit M.A. Libert …, 4 vols. Typis Jacobi Desoer, Leodii [Liège, Luik], Belgium [TL-2 4497].
Libert M-A (1836). Précis des observations sur la famille des Hypoxylons. Annales des Sciences Naturelles 7: 121–125.

== Works ==
- (1826). Mémoires sur des cryptogames observées aux environs de Malmedy
- (1830–1837). Plantae cryptogamicae quas in Arduenna collegit M. A. Libert. 4 volumes, i.e. exsiccata work

Felix von Thümen issued several fascicles of his exsiccata series Mycotheca universalis with the subtitle Reliquiae Libertianae and distributed specimens collected by M.-A. Libert.

== See also ==
- Timeline of women in science

== Bibliography ==
- Creese, Mary R. S.; Creese, Thomas M. (2004). Ladies in the Laboratory II: West European Women in Science, 1800–1900: A Survey of Their Contributions to Research. Scarecrow Press. pp. 101–104. ISBN 978-0-8108-4979-2.
- Lawalrée, André (1965). Marie-Anne Libert, 1782–1865 : biographie, généalogie, bibliographie. Famille et Terroir. p. 126..
