= Theodorovia =

Scientific classification
- Kingdom: Plantae
- Clade: Tracheophytes
- Clade: Angiosperms
- Clade: Eudicots
- Clade: Asterids
- Order: Asterales
- Family: Campanulaceae
- Subfamily: Campanuloideae
- Genus: Theodorovia; Kolak.

Synonyms
- Campanula hakkiarica P.H.Davis; Campanula karakuschensis Grossh.; Campanula minsteriana Grossh.; Fedorovia karakuschensis (Grossh.) Kolak.

Species of flowering plant

Theodorovia is a monotypic genus of flowering plants belonging to the family Campanulaceae. It only contains one known species, Theodorovia karakuschensis (Grossh.) Kolak.

Its native range is Iran, the Transcaucasus and Turkey.

The genus name of Theodorovia is in honour of Andrey A. Fedorov (1908–1987), a Soviet Russian biologist, botanist, taxonomist and phytogeographer, who was from 1970 a corresponding member of the Academy of Sciences of the USSR. The genus Theodorovia has the synonym Fedorovia Kolak. The plant is normally found on higher ground.

The genus was first circumscribed in Kolokol'chik. Kavkaza on pages 50-51 in 1991, to house a species which had previously been described in Campanula.

It has been used in Turkey in folk medicine to treat kidney stones.
