= Institut Redouté-Peiffer =

School in Brussels, Belgium

Coordinates: 50°50′03″N 4°22′15″E

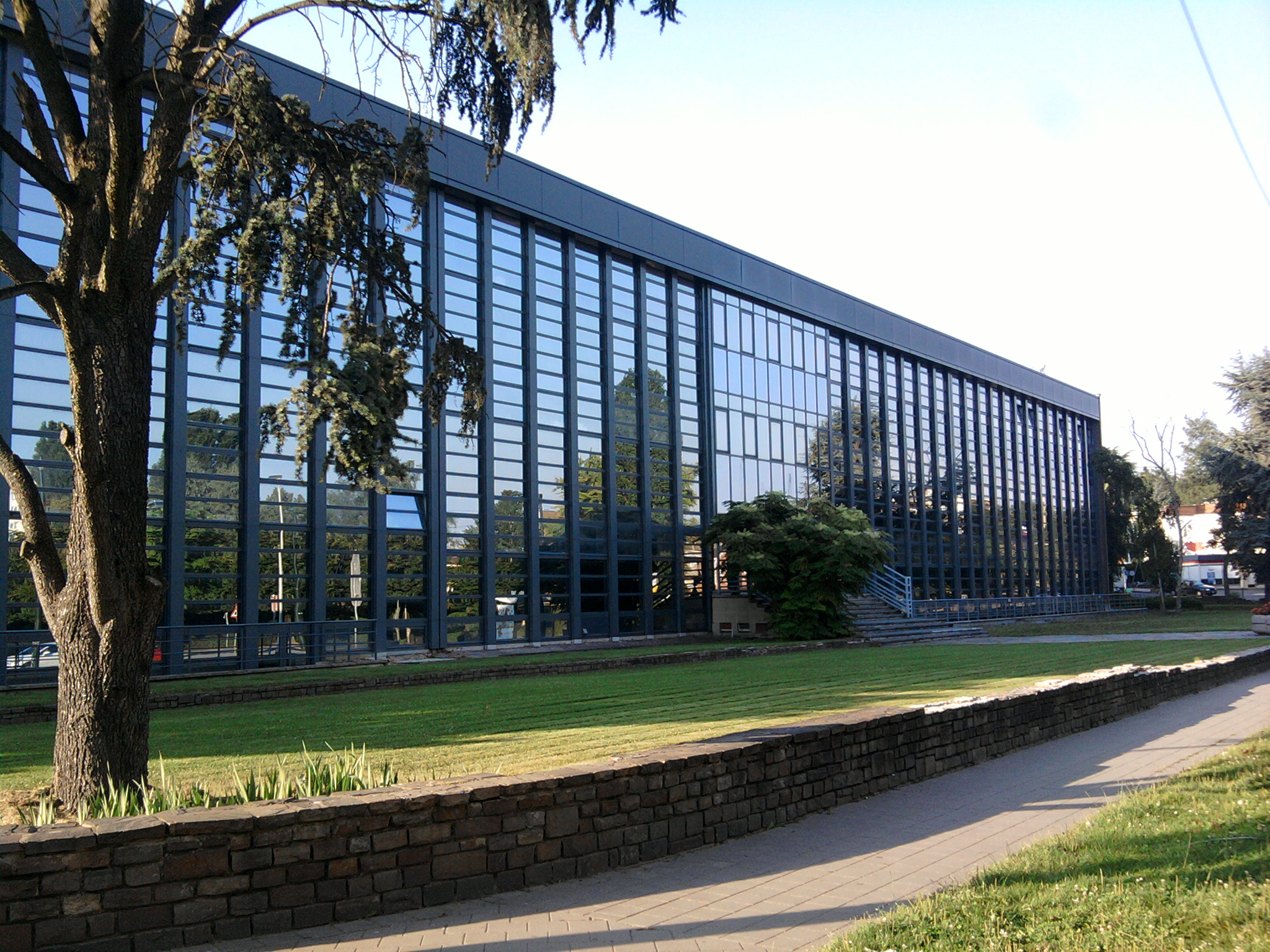
Institut Redouté-Peiffer

The Institut Redouté-Peiffer is a French-language secondary technical and professional school in the municipality of Anderlecht in Brussels, Belgium. It is under the control of the French Community Commission (French: Communautaire Française, pronounced "COCOF"), and was previously the provincial college of the Province of Brabant.

It was created from the merger of the Institut Pierre-Joseph Redouté and the Institut Serge Peiffer. It is best known for its main subjects of horticulture and applied science.

== History ==
The Institut Redouté-Peiffer was created in September 1996 from the merger of the Institut Pierre-Joseph Redouté and the Institut Serge Peiffer. The Institut Pierre-Joseph Redouté gets its name from the painter of roses, a watercolourist born in Saint-Hubert, Belgium, in the 18th century.

In 1913, the provincial college of then-Province of Brabant set up a gardening school. Over the years, other sections were opened: floriculture, fruit arboriculture, floristry, additional subjects for horticultural professionals, and a high school for landscape gardening. Today, these advanced sections make up the Lucia de Brouckère High School – Institut Arthur Haulot.

Serge Peiffer, for whom the institute was named, was an alumnus of the institute, Doctor of Chemistry and Biochemistry, diplomate of the Université libre de Bruxelles (ULB), and field researcher.

Today, the institute has changed to support diverse modern needs and offer new subjects. Its education is attractive to the employment market and for getting access to higher studies. Students can choose a general education, a transitional technical course, or a professional technical qualification education in the areas of horticulture, science, economics, photography, physical education, sport and cuisine.

== Facilities ==
- Glasshouses, rock garden, plant collections, arboretum, horticultural study sites in Tubize and Pamel, laboratories for general chemistry, organic chemistry and biochemistry, pharmacology, cosmetology, physical education and biology
- Information technology laboratories for economics and scientific studies
- Multimedia rooms
- Studio, graphics laboratory, and darkrooms for photography
- Sports rooms on both two sites
- Self-service refectories
