= Jaakko Jalas =

Finnish botanist (1920–1999)

- Born: 7 May 1920; Hämeenlinna
- Died: 1 December 1999 (aged 79); Helsinki
- Scientific career
- Fields: botany
- Author abbrev. (botany): Jalas

Arvo Jaakko Juhani Jalas (7 May 1920 – 1 December 1999) was a Finnish botanist. He worked in the University of Helsinki.

== Career ==
He began his university studies in 1938, one year before the Russian–Finnish Winter War, where he fought on the front, and again in the Continuation War in 1941 and 1944. In that period, he made botanical expeditions to the disputed territory of Karelia (now the Republic of Karelia).

After the war, he completed his PhD in Botany in 1950, with a dissertation entitled Zur Kausalanalyse der Verbreitung einiger nordischen Os- und Sandpflanzen on the distribution, ecology and sociology of the plants of eskers and sandy areas of northern Europe. From 1961, he worked at the University of Helsinki as an Assistant Professor of Botany until 1971 when he was promoted to professor extraordinary (associate professor) and in 1976 to Professor of Plant Systematics, Morpholoy and Phytogeography. In 1978–1983, he was the director of the Department of Botany, the Botanical Garden and the Botanical Museum. He retired in 1984.

He did much research work on taxonomy and the geographic distribution of plants. He was regional adviser for Finland to the Flora Europaea project, and became co-chairman of the mapping project for European vascular plants Atlas Florae Europaeae. He was a founding member of OPTIMA (the Organization for the Phyto-Taxonomic Investigation of the Mediterranean Area). He was also interested in the economic botany and flora of the Fennoscandia, and he contributed greatly to the knowledge of Finnish flora.

He was also specialised in the study of Caryophyllaceae and the genus Thymus, a matter which occupied a long period of his professional life. His studies on Thymus remain as a work of reference on the subject.

He died at his home in Helsinki on 1 December 1999.

== Some publications ==
- 1949. Tellima grandiflora (Pursh) Dougl. found naturalized in Finland
- 1948. Eastern forms of Thymus pulegioides L. in the Flora of Fennoscandia.

=== Atlas Florae Europaeae ===
- Jalas, J. & Suominen, J. (ed.) 1972: Atlas Florae Europaeae. 1. Pteridophyta (Psilotaceae to Azollaceae). - 121 pp . Helsinki.
- Jalas, J. & Suominen, J. (ed.) 1973: Atlas Florae Europaeae. 2. Gymnospermae (Pinaceae to Ephedraceae). - 40 pp. Helsinki.
- Jalas, J. & Suominen, J. (ed.) 1976: Atlas Florae Europaeae. 3. Salicaceae to Balanophoraceae. - 128 pp. Helsinki.
- Jalas, J. & Suominen, J. (ed.) 1979: Atlas Florae Europaeae. 4. Polygonaceae. - 71 pp. Helsinki.
- Jalas, J. & Suominen, J. (ed.) 1980: Atlas Florae Europaeae. 5. Chenopodiaceae to Basellaceae. - 119 pp. Helsinki.
- Jalas, J. 1983: Atlas Florae Europaeae notes. L. New nomenclatural combinations in Alsinoideae and Paronychioideae (Caryophyllaceae). - Ann. Bot. Fennici 20: 109-111.
- Jalas, J. & Suominen, J. (ed.) 1983: Atlas Florae Europaeae. 6. Caryophyllaceae (Alsinoideae and Paronychioideae). - 176 pp. Helsinki.
- Jalas, J. 1985: Atlas Florae Europaeae notes. 5. New nomenclatural combinations in Dianthus and Aconitum. - Ann. Bot. Fennici 22: 219-221.
- Jalas, J. & Suominen, J. (ed.) 1986: Atlas Florae Europaeae. 7. Caryophyllaceae (Silenoideae). - 229 pp. Helsinki.
- Jalas, J. 1988: Atlas Florae Europaeae notes. 9-11. Ranunculaceae. - Ann. Bot. Fennici 20: 109-111.
- Jalas, J. & Suominen, J. (ed.) 1988: Atlas Florae Europaeae. I-III. - Published as a facsimile compendium of Atlas Florae Europaeae 1-7 (1972–86). Cambridge.
- Jalas, J. & Suominen, J. (ed.) 1989: Atlas Florae Europaeae. 8. Nymphaeaceae to Ranunculaceae. - 261 pp. Helsinki.
- Jalas, J. & Suominen, J. (ed.) 1991: Atlas Florae Europaeae. 9. Paeoniaceae to Capparaceae. - 110 pp. Helsinki.
- Jalas, J. & Suominen, J. (ed.) 1994: Atlas Florae Europaeae. 10. Cruciferae (Sisymbrium to Aubrieta). - 224 pp. Helsinki.
- Jalas, J. 1996: Atlas Florae Europaeae notes. 13. Suggestions on Alyssum and Lepidium (Cruciferae). - Ann. Bot. Fennici 33: 283-284.
- Jalas, J., Suominen, J. & Lampinen, R. (ed.) 1996: Atlas Florae Europaeae. 11. Cruciferae (Ricotia to Raphanus). - 310 pp. Helsinki.
- Jalas, J., Suominen, J., Lampinen, R. & Kurtto, A. (ed.) 1999: Atlas Florae Europaeae. 12. Resedaceae to Platanaceae. - 250 pp. Helsinki.
