= Julie Ribault =

French painter

Julie Ribault (27 March 1789 in Fresnay-sur-Sarthe – 26 November 1885 in Paris) was a French painter, engraver, and illustrator. She was a genre painter and portrait painter, having studied under Louis Lafitte.
