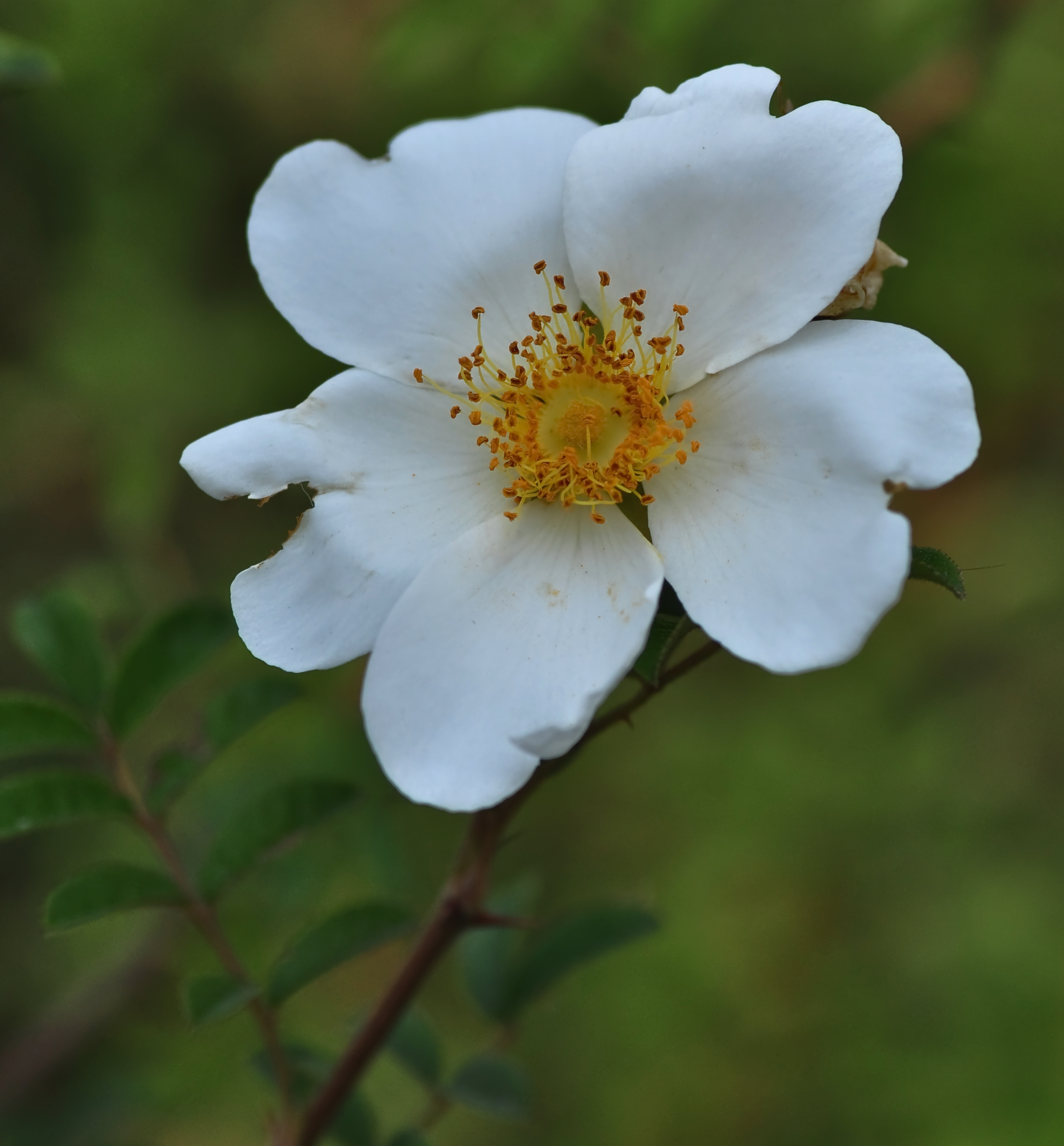

Scientific classification
- Kingdom: Plantae
- Clade: Embryophytes
- Clade: Tracheophytes
- Clade: Angiosperms
- Clade: Eudicots
- Clade: Rosids
- Order: Rosales
- Family: Rosaceae
- Genus: Rosa
- Species: R. clinophylla

Binomial name
- Rosa clinophylla Thory

Synonyms
- Rosa involucrata Roxb. ex Lindl.; R. involucrata Roxb. nom. nud.; R. lyellii Lindl.; R. palustris Buch.-Ham. ex Lindl.

= Rosa clinophylla =

Species of shrub

Rosa clinophylla is a member of the genus Rosa native to the Himalayas, South Asia, and Southeast Asia.

It is a large shrub growing to 6 metres (20 ft) tall and it can grow in swampy areas such as the haors (or beels, jheels) of Bangladesh. In contrast, modern roses cannot withstand waterlogging even for two days. Seeing its tolerant characteristic in tropical regions, experts including A. F. Allen was attracted to it back in 1977.
