= Erwin Janchen =

Austrian botanist (1882–1970)

Emil Erwin Alfred Ritter von Janchen-Michel (born 15 May 1882 in Vöcklabruck; died 10 July 1970 in Vienna) was an Austrian botanist.

== Life and work ==
He earned his doctorate in 1923 at the University of Vienna. He was scientifically active at the Botanical Institute of the University. He made several research trips. Among the plants first described by Janchen (with co-author Gustav Wendelberger) is the native Austrian wild form of Brassica rapa subsp. silvestris.

== Publications ==
- (1906) Ein Beitrag Zur Kenntnis Der Flora Der Herzegowina – Contributions to the flora of Herzegovina.
- (1907) Helianthemum canum (L.) Baumg, und seine nächsten Verwandten. Jena: Gustav Fischer – Helianthemum canum Baumg.) and related plants.
- (1908) Die europäischen Gattungen der Farn-und Blütenpflanzen: nach dem Wettsteinschen System – European fern and flowering plant genera according to the Wettstein system.
- (1935) Obst, Südfrüchte (einschliesslich Agrumen ) und Mohn. Vienna: Springer.
- (1954, as editor) Festschrift für Erwin Aichinger zum 60. Geburtstag. Vienna: Springer.
- (1956 with Karl Hőfler & Fritz Knoll) Catalogus Florae Austriae - Ein systematisches Verzeichnis der auf österreichischem Gebiet festgestellten Pflanzenarten, I. Teil: Pteridophyten und Anthophyten (Farne und Blütenpflanzen). Vienna: Springer.
- (1977) Flora von Wien, Niederösterreich und Nordburgenland. Vienna: Verein für Landeskunde von Niederösterreich u. Wien, 2nd edition 1977 – Flora of Vienna, Lower Austria and north Burgenland.
