= Boris Schischkin =

Russian botanist

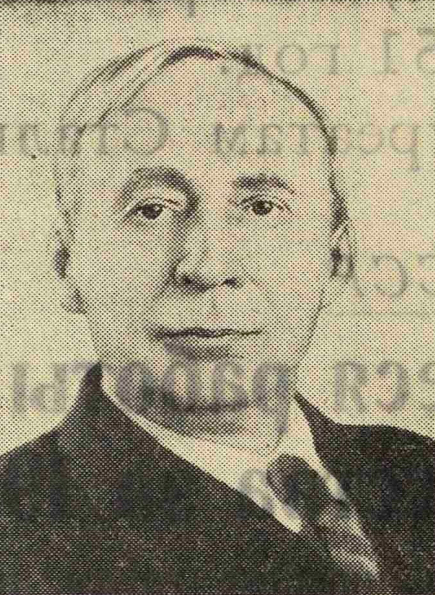
- Evening Moscow. - 1952.
- Born: Boris Konstantinovich Schischkin (Борис Константинович Шишкин); 19 April 1886; Kukarka, Russian Empire
- Died: 21 February 1963 (aged 76); Leningrad, USSR
- Education: Imperial Tomsk University
- Scientific career
- Fields: Botany
- Workplaces: Tomsk University; Botanical Institute of the USSR Academy of Sciences; Leningrad State University

Boris Konstantinovich Schischkin (born 19 April [O.S. 7 April] 1886 in Kukarka; died 21 March 1963 in Leningrad) was a Russian botanist and from 1943 corresponding member of the Academy of Sciences of the USSR. His name was Russian: Борис Константинович Шишкин, with his surname sometimes transliterated as Shishkin.

== Life and Works ==
In 1911 Schischkin graduated from the Faculty of Medicine of Tomsk State University and from 1913 to 1915 he taught there. Between 1915 and 1918 he worked as a military medical officer.

From 1918 to 1925 he headed the botanical section of the Caucasian Museum in Tbilisi. Schischkin edited some exsiccata series. Together with Alexander Alfonsovich Grossheim he published and distributed the exsiccata Plantae orientales exsiccatae (1924–1928). From 1925 to 1930 he was professor at the Tomsk State University, where he held a chair of morphology and plant systematics. From 1930 he worked in the Komarov Botanical Institute of the Academy of Sciences of the USSR (from 1938 to 1949 as director) and from 1945 to 1958 also as professor at Leningrad University. From 1946 to 1963 he was vice-president of the Botanical Society of the USSR. Shishkin's herbarium included more than thirty thousand samples, the majority of which are held in Tomsk.

His main work was concerned with the classification of flowering plants (especially from the families Caryophyllaceae, Umbelliferae and Compositae) and plant geography (Siberia, Transcaucasia). He was the organizer and editor of numerous joint works, including The Flora of the USSR (Russian: Флора СССР), The Flora of the Byelorussian SSR (Russian: Флора БССР), the Flora of the Leningrad Oblast ( Russian: Флора Ленинградской области) and the Flora of Turkmenistan (Russian: Флора Туркмении). He was a regional adviser for the Soviet Union on the Flora Europaea project.

Another significant works of the 1900s was 'Flora Rossiae Austro-orientalis' (1927–1936, index in 1938) by Boris Fedtschenko and Schischkin.

== Honours ==
Shishkin was awarded the USSR State Prize (1952), the Order of Lenin and other medals.

He was an honorary member of the Société Botanique de France and Botanical Society of Washington.

The plant genera Schischkinia Iljin (Compositae) and Schischkinella Steenis (synonym of Gastrocalyx; Caryophyllaceae) were named in his honour. Additionally, a number of species use schischkinii as specific epithet.
