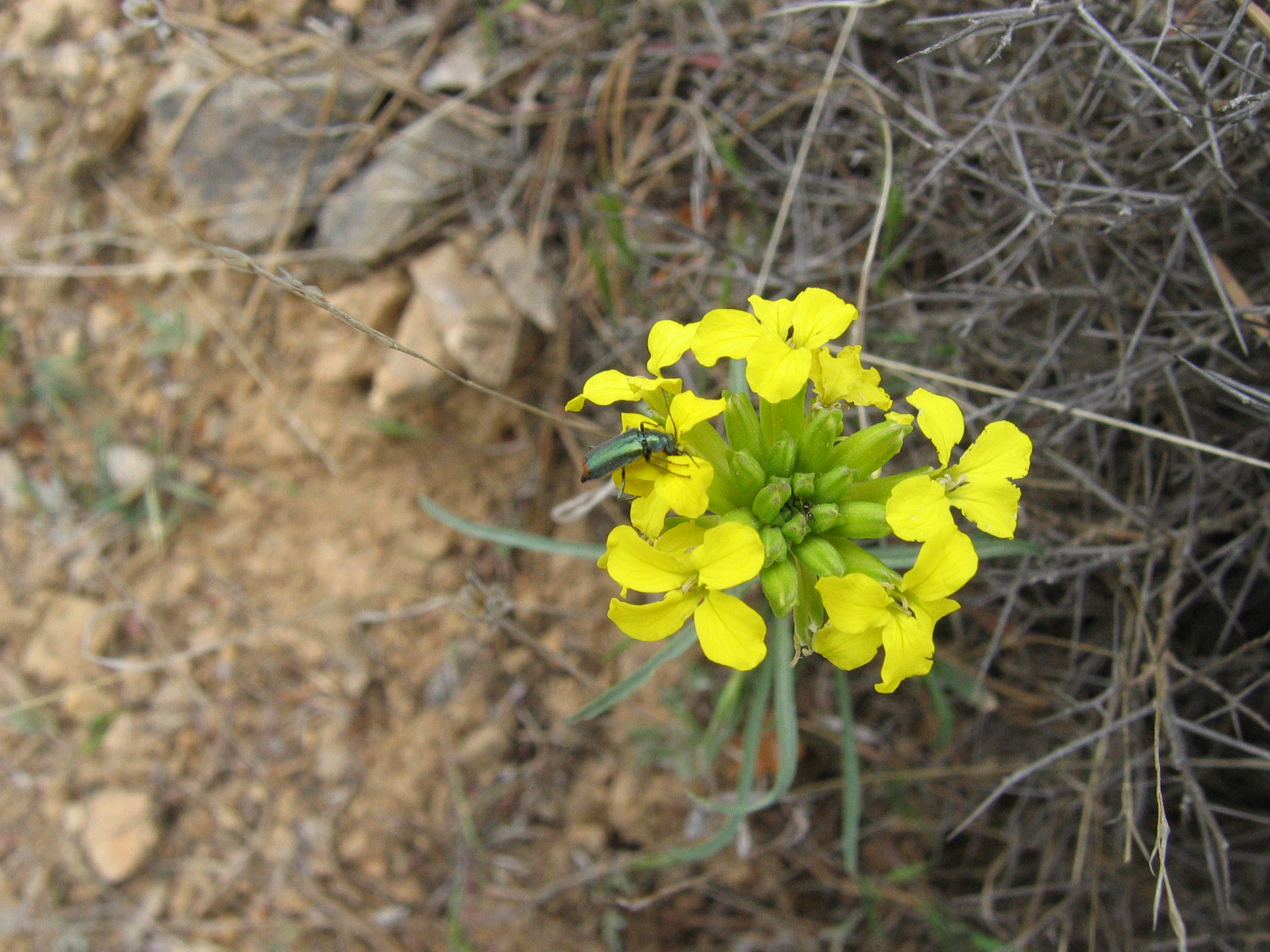

Scientific classification
- Kingdom: Plantae
- Clade: Tracheophytes
- Clade: Angiosperms
- Clade: Eudicots
- Clade: Rosids
- Order: Brassicales
- Family: Brassicaceae
- Genus: Erysimum
- Species: E. nevadense

Binomial name
- Erysimum nevadense Reut.

= Erysimum nevadense =

Species of flowering plant

Erysimum nevadense is a perennial short-lived herb endemic to the Sierra Nevada of Spain, although there are some citations in the nearby Sierra de Gádor (Almería). This wallflower occurs between 1,700 and 2,700 m above sea level in subalpine scrublands and alpine meadows. It may be treated as a narrowly circumscribed single species, one of a group or complex of six separate species, or as a more broadly circumscribed species with six subspecies.

== Description ==
Erysimum nevadense sensu stricto (synonym Erysimum nevadense subsp. nevadense) is a biennial or perennial plant, generally branched with multiple flowering stems, usually less than 25 cm (10 in) high. It is well supplied with hairs, most of which are boat-shaped (navicular), although some are three-rayed. Its leaves, which may appear greyish-green because of the hairs, are much narrower than long, usually 20–60 cm (8–24 in) long by 1–3 mm (0.0–0.1 in) wide. The flowering stems, excluding the raceme of flowers, are 2–15 cm (0.8–5.9 in) long. Individual flowers have yellow petals that are 12–16 mm (0.5–0.6 in) long and 3–4 mm (0.1–0.2 in) wide and a style 1.5–3 mm (0.06–0.12 in) long. The fruits are upright or drooping, usually less than 4 cm (1.6 in) long on pedicels up to 6 mm (0.2 in) long.

== Taxonomy ==
Erysimum nevadense was first described by Georges François Reuter in 1855. In 1979, Adolf Polatschek described a number of new species of Erysimum. Six of these were considered to be closely related to E. nevadense, and in 1990, Peter William Ball explained the decision made in Flora Europaea to reduce the six to subspecies of E. nevadense. They were treated as separate species making up the nevadense group or complex in Flora Iberica in 1993. A molecular phylogenetic study published in 2014 included four of the species, E. gomez-campoi, E. mediohispanicum, E. nevadense and E. rondae. The study did not support the view that the four were closely related. In the combined mitochondrial and nuclear DNA analysis, E. mediohispanicum and E. nevadense fell into one clade, E. rondae into another, while E. gomez-campoi was sister to both clades. The authors concluded that the E. nevadense group did not have phylogenetic support.

=== Subspecies ===
Plants of the World Online divides Erysimum nevadense into six subspecies, which Flora Iberica treat as separate species.

- Erysimum nevadense subsp. fitzii (Polatschek) P.W.Ball = Erysimum fitzii Polatschek
- Erysimum nevadense subsp. gomez-campoi (Polatschek) P.W.Ball = Erysimum gomez-campoi Polatschek
- Erysimum nevadense subsp. mediohispanicum (Polatschek) P.W.Ball = Erysimum mediohispanicum Polatschek
- Erysimum nevadense subsp. merxmuelleri (Polatschek) P.W.Ball = Erysimum merxmuelleri Polatschek
- Erysimum nevadense subsp. nevadense = Erysimum nevadense Reut., sensu stricto
- Erysimum nevadense subsp. rondae (Polatschek) P.W.Ball = Erysimum rondae Polatschek

== Pollination biology ==
As an alpine plant, this flower exhibits a generalist pollination system in which nearly any available flower visitor can serve as a legitimate pollinator. Alpine environments typically favor low energy-demanding but less efficient pollinators such as flies, beetles, and ants over the bees and bee flies common at lower elevations. The primary pollinators of E. nevadense are diverse, comprising more than 30 species across six orders and over 20 families, with considerable variation in morphology, body size, proboscis length, and foraging behavior. Beetles were the most frequent visitors to E. nevadense flowers, followed by hover flies. Other abundant flower visitors are Proformica longiseta (Formicidae), an ant species endemic to the Sierra Nevada and surrounding mountain ranges, Dasytes subaeneus (Melyridae), Malachius laticollis (Malachidae) and some species of bee flies belonging to the genus Bombylius and Parageron (Bombyliidae).
