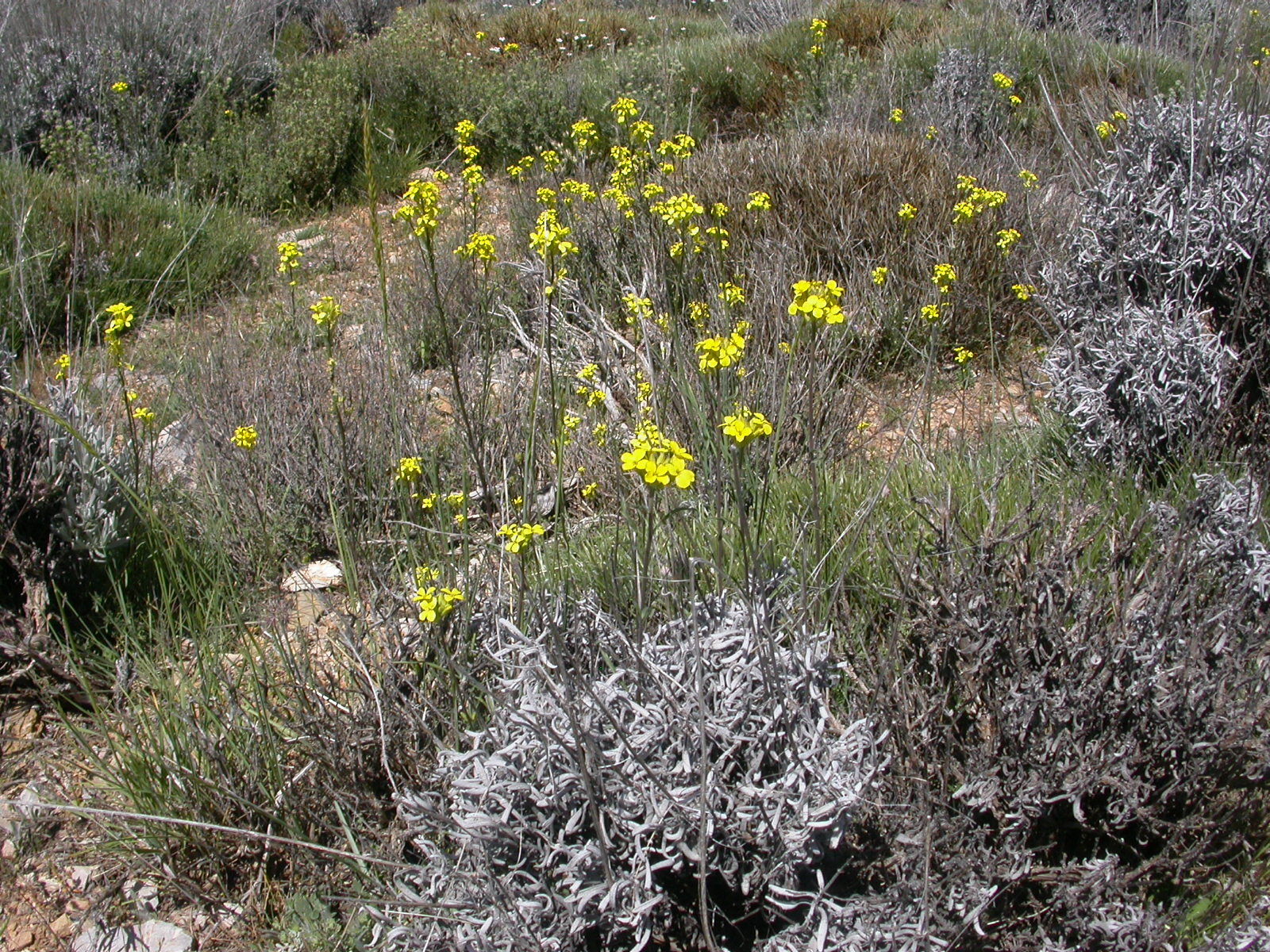

Scientific classification
- Kingdom: Plantae
- Clade: Tracheophytes
- Clade: Angiosperms
- Clade: Eudicots
- Clade: Rosids
- Order: Brassicales
- Family: Brassicaceae
- Genus: Erysimum
- Species: E. mediohispanicum

Binomial name
- Erysimum mediohispanicum Polatschek

Synonyms
- Erysimum grandiflorum subsp. mediohispanicum (Polatschek) O.Bolòs & Vigo; Erysimum nevadense subsp. mediohispanicum (Polatschek) P.W.Ball

= Erysimum mediohispanicum =

Species of flowering plant

Erysimum mediohispanicum is a perennial short-lived monocarpic herb found in many montane regions of eastern Spain where it is distributed between 800–2,000 m above sea level and inhabits forests, scrublands, and shrublands. It occupies two main regions in the Iberian Peninsula, one in the north (Soria to Lleida) and the other in the south-east (Granada, Albacete, Jaén, and Almería provinces). Erysimum mediohispanicum may be treated as one of a group or complex of six closely related species, or as Erysimum nevadense subsp. mediohispanicum.

== Description ==
Plant morphology is very plastic in this species. Reproductive plants produce one to eight reproductive stalks from 8 to 130 cm tall. Each flowering stalk can display between 5 and approx. 100 bright yellow (up to several hundred), hermaphroditic, slightly protandrous flowers arranged in corymbous inflorescences.

Seeds germinate during early spring (March to early May). Seed germination is very high, usually higher than 80% in most localities. Seedlings grow for 2–4 years as vegetative rosettes. Much mortality occurs during the first summer due to the usually severe summer drought occurring in the Mediterranean environment. Surviving individuals flower during their second year, and after flowering most individuals die. However, there are a low proportion of individuals that reproduce more than once, this proportion of iteroparous individuals varying geographically.

== Taxonomy ==
Erysimum mediohispanicum was one of a number of new Erysimum species first described by Adolf Polatschek in 1979. Six of these, including E. mediohispanicum, were considered to be closely related and were reduced to subspecies of E. nevadense in Flora Europaea, a decision explained by Peter William Ball in 1990. The six were treated as separate species making up the E. nevadense group or complex in Flora Iberica in 1993. A molecular phylogenetic study published in 2014 included four of the species, including E. mediohispanicum. The study did not support the view that the four were closely related, and authors concluded that the E. nevadense group did not have phylogenetic support.

== Pollination biology ==
Flowers have a tetradynamous androecium, with four long and two short stamens. Each flowers contain a variable number of ovules, ranging between 15 and 30 approx. Flowers have a non-fused corolla tube formed by the union of the petals and sepals. Flowers produce minute amount of nectar in four nectaries located in the base of the corolla tube, around the ovary. Corolla shape is extremely variable, ranging from radially to bilaterally symmetric even in the same population.

Flowers are visited by more than one hundred species of insects belonging to the order Hymenoptera, Diptera, Coleoptera, Lepidoptera and Heteroptera. Although this crucifer is self-compatible, it needs pollen vectors to produce full seedset. In fact, plants experimentally excluded from pollinators set only 16% of the fruits set by naturally pollinated plants. Abundant pollinators are the beetles Meligethes maurus (Nitidulidae), Dasytes subaeneus (Dasytinae), Malachius laticollis (Malachiinae) and Anthrenus sp. (Dermestidae), the solitary bees Anthophora leucophaea (Apidae) and Halictus simplex (Halictidae), and the beeflies Bombylius spp. (Bombyliidae).

== Herbivory ==
In southeastern Spain, reproductive individuals are consumed by many different species of herbivores. Some floral buds do not open because they are galled by flies (Dasineura sp., Cecidomyiidae). Several species of sap-suckers (primarily the bugs Eurydema oleracea, E. fieberi, E. ornata, and Corimeris denticulatus) feed on the reproductive stalks during flowering and fruiting. In addition, stalks are bored into by a weevil species (presumably Lixus ochraceus, Curculionidae), which consumes the inner tissues, whereas another weevil species (Ceutorhynchus chlorophanus, Curculionidae) develops inside the fruits, living on developing seeds and acting as predispersal seed predators. The stalks are browsed by Spanish ibex (Capra pyrenaica, Bovidae), which consume flowers and mostly green fruits. Dispersed seeds are consumed by woodmice (Apodemus sylvaticus, Muridae), several species of birds (Fringilla coelebs, Serinus serinus, and Carduelis cannabina Fringillidae, among others), several species of medium-sized granivorous beetles (Iberozabrus sp. Carabidae, among others), and ants (Lasius niger, Tetramorium caespitum, Cataglyphis velox and Leptothorax tristis). These animals feed on the seeds from late August to early April. Seedlings and juveniles are sometime injured by ibex, sheep, wild boars (Sus scrofa, Suidae), hares (Lepus granatense, Leporidae), and voles (Pitimys spp., Arvicolidae), although most seedlings die due to summer drought and seed quality.

== Seed dispersal ==
Erysimum mediohispanicum produce tiny seeds (less than 0.5 mg) that are autochorously (by gravity) dispersed during August and September (about 40–60 days after pollination), when the valves of the dehiscent fruits (siliquae) open due to moving vegetation, wind rain or physical contact. Dispersal distance is very short in this species, just very few seeds travelling farther than 1 meter from the plant source. Seed dispersal distance is positively related to flowering stalk height, taller plants usually dispersing seeds farther.
