= Carex mckittrickensis =

Conservation status
- Critically Imperiled (NatureServe)

Scientific classification
- Kingdom: Plantae
- Clade: Tracheophytes
- Clade: Angiosperms
- Clade: Monocots
- Clade: Commelinids
- Order: Poales
- Family: Cyperaceae
- Genus: Carex
- Subgenus: Carex subg. Carex
- Section: Carex sect. Albae
- Species: C. mckittrickensis

Binomial name
- Carex mckittrickensis P.W.Ball

Species of grass-like plant

Carex mckittrickensis, the Guadalupe Mountain sedge, is a species of sedge endemic to Guadalupe Mountains National Park in western Texas. It occurs on the sides of steep ravines and also in riparian forests.

== Description ==
Carex mckittrickensis is an herb up to 35 centimetres (14 in) tall, spreading by means of underground rhizomes. Its stems are round in cross-section and covered with reddish-brown leaf sheaths toward the base. Its leaves are thread-like, up to 17 cm (6.7 in) long and less than 1 cm (0.39 in) across. Staminate (male) flowering spikes form at the top of the plant, with pistillate (female) spikes in axils of the leaves.

== Taxonomy ==
Carex mckittrickensis is very closely related to the widespread Carex eburnea, but differs in the large size of many of its floral parts. It was described in 1998 by Peter W. Ball of the University of Toronto, and named after McKittrick Canyon in the Guadalupe Mountains National Park.
