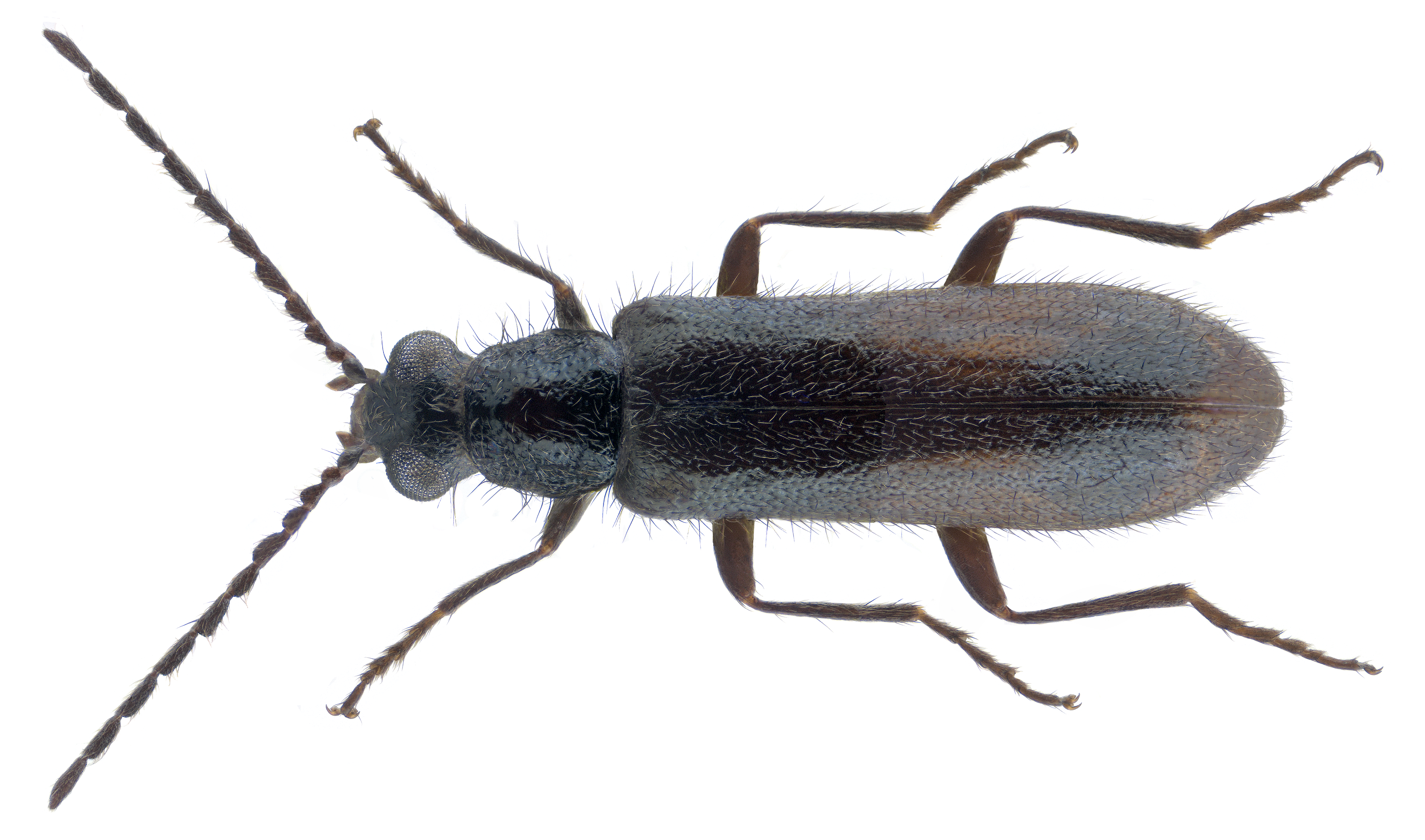
- Dasytes aerata, United Kingdom

Scientific classification
- Kingdom: Animalia
- Phylum: Arthropoda
- Clade: Pancrustacea
- Class: Insecta
- Order: Coleoptera
- Suborder: Polyphaga
- Infraorder: Cucujiformia
- Family: Melyridae
- Subfamily: Dasytinae
- Genus: Dasytes
- Species: D. aerata

Binomial name
- Dasytes aerata Stephens, 1830

= Dasytes aerata =

Species of beetle

Dasytes aerata is a species of soft-winged flower beetle in the family Melyridae. It is found mainly in Europe. The species name is frequently misspelled as "aeratus" in the literature.

They are slender beetles, which shine from bronze to slate-black and are 4–5.2 mm long. Their silvery-grey base hair lies flat. In addition, their bodies have some upright bristles (setae). Unlike the similar species Dasytes plumbeus, their legs are completely darkened. Sexual dimorphism is barely noticeable. Males have larger eyes and narrower, longer antennae.

The larvae are about 4 mm long. They have a light brownish-yellow base colour. The body segments show a dark brown pattern on the dorsal side. The head is relatively flat and dark brown on the dorsal side. The legs are darkened. At the end of the abdomen, there are two appendages.

The typical habitat of these beetles is hedgerow biotopes. The adults are mainly seen between April and June. During this time, mating and egg-laying by the females take place. The beetles visit various flowering trees and bushes and are considered important pollinators. The larvae develop in decayed and white-rotted wood, including that of oaks, beeches, blackthorns, hawthorns, and hazels. You can also often find them on the trunks of plane trees from late September to late November. The larvae are predators, feeding on small insects and arthropods. They apparently also eat dead small animals. They overwinter either as pupae or still as larvae.

== Gallery ==
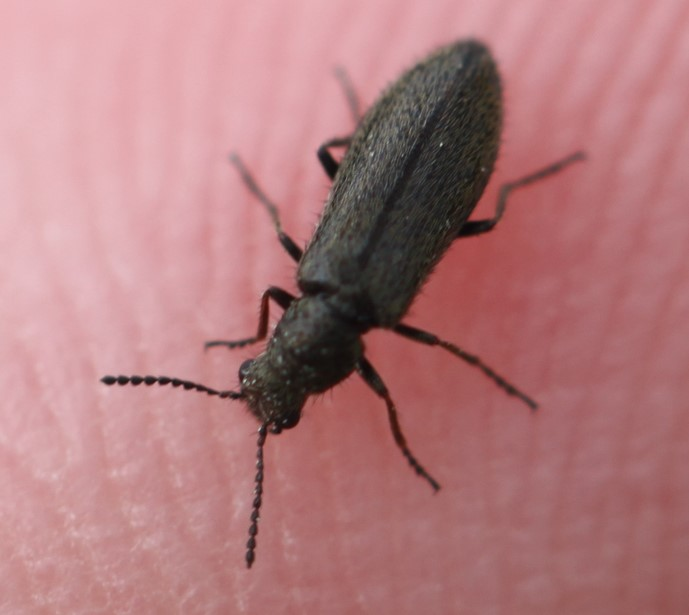
Dasytes cf. aeratus at the end of May

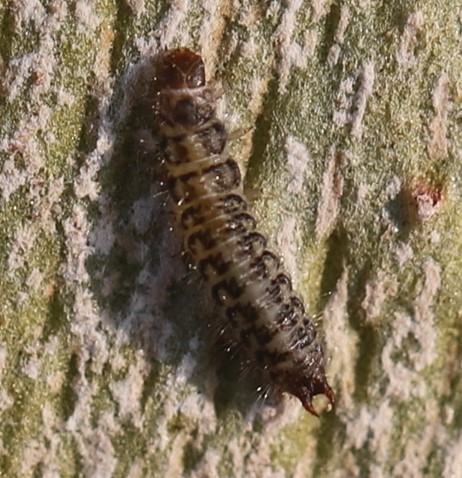
Larva of Dasytes aeratus, October on a Plane tree trunk

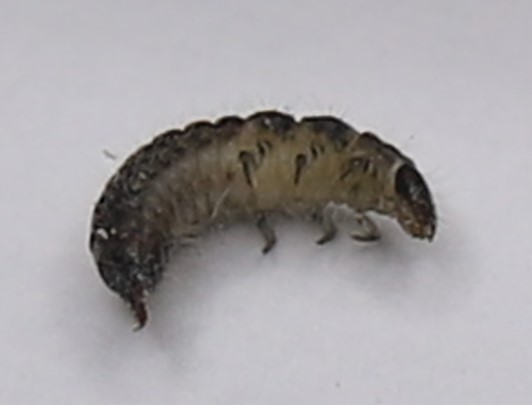
Larva of Dasytes aeratus

Video of adult beetle (49 sec)
