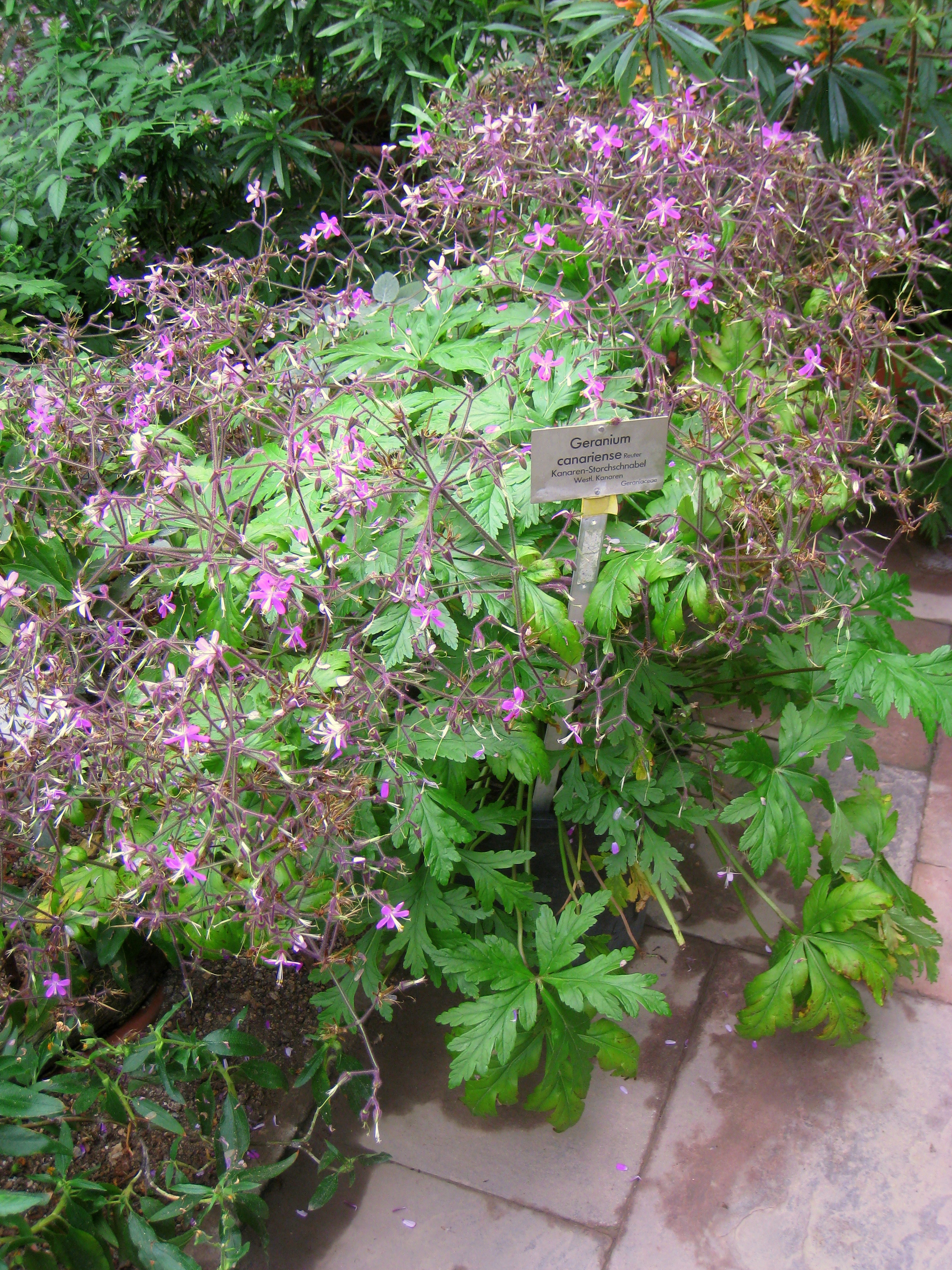

Scientific classification
- Kingdom: Plantae
- Clade: Tracheophytes
- Clade: Angiosperms
- Clade: Eudicots
- Clade: Rosids
- Order: Geraniales
- Family: Geraniaceae
- Genus: Geranium
- Species: G. reuteri

Binomial name
- Geranium reuteri Aedo & Muñoz Garm.

Synonyms
- Geranium canariense Reut., illegitimate

= Geranium reuteri =

Species of flowering plant

Geranium reuteri, the giant geranium, is a species of flowering plant in the family Geraniaceae, endemic to the Canary Islands. It was known for many years under the name Geranium canariense. In Spanish, it is called pata de gallo.

== Description ==
Geranium reuteri is a large perennial herbaceous plant with a short stem and deeply divided leaves. The plant forms brilliant carpets on the floor of laurel forests and wax myrtle-tree heath scrub.

The leaves grow in a rosette from a woody base or short stem, and are up to 8 cm (3.1 in) wide with a long (stalk). The flowers are 2–3 cm (0.8–1.2 in) across. Each flower has five sepals and five pink petals with whitish backs. Appearing in late March to mid-May, the flowers are borne on a branched inflorescence and are deeply divided into lobes.

== Gallery ==
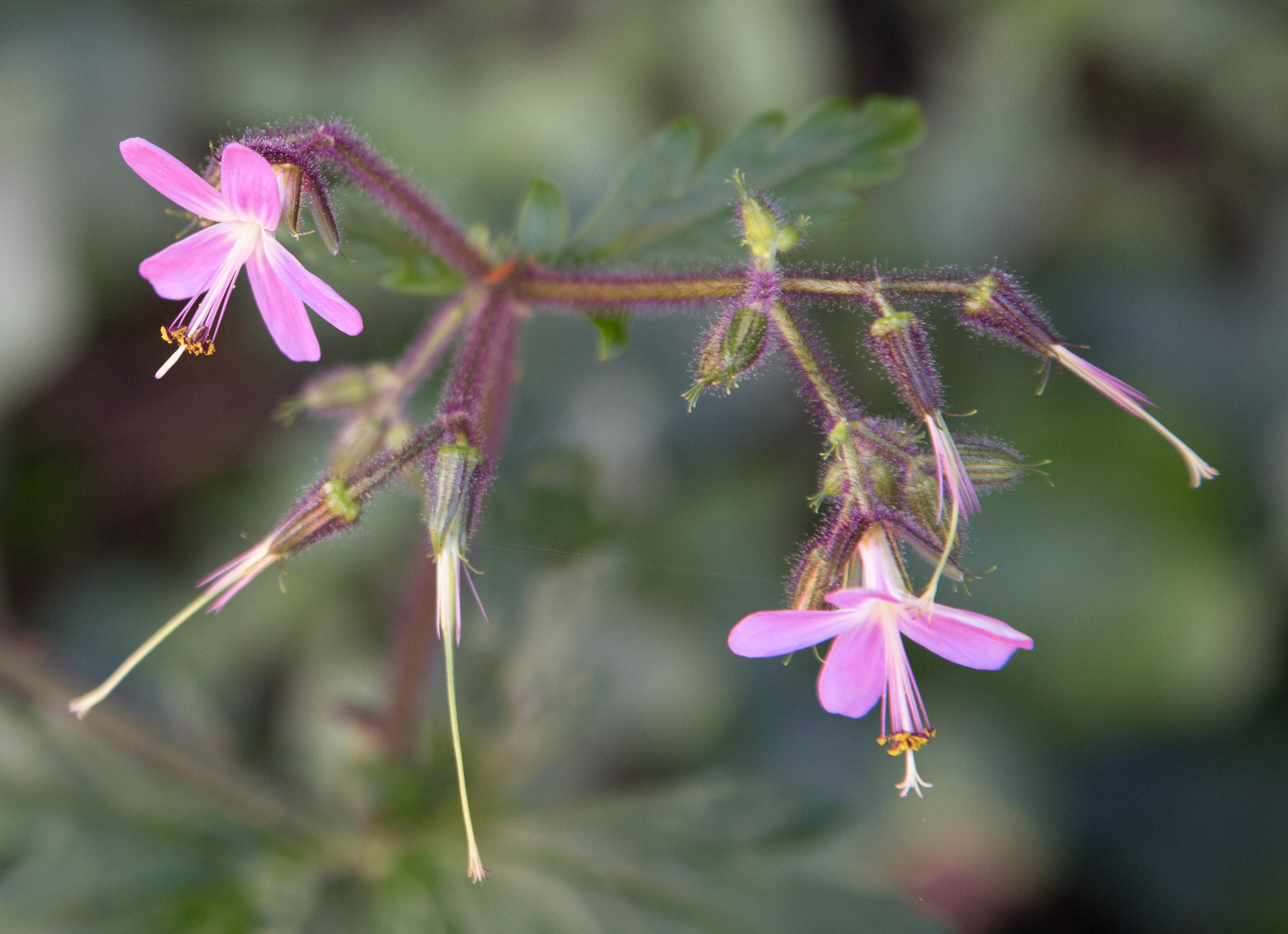
Flowers

== Taxonomy ==
The species was first described in 1858 by George François Reuter as Geranium canariense. It was known by this name until 1997. However, Reuter's name is illegitimate, because Jean Poiret had already used the name Geranium canariense in 1812 for a different species. (Poiret's Geranium canariense, transferred from Pelargonium canariense Willd., is now regarded as a synonym for Pelargonium candicans.) Noticing that Reuter's name was illegitimate, in 1997, Carlos Aedo and Félix Muñoz Garmendia published the replacement name Geranium reuteri.

== Distribution and habitat ==
Geranium reuteri is native to the Canary Islands. In the Canary Islands it is found in Tenerife, La Palma, La Gomera, El Hierro and Gran Canaria. It is absent from the eastern islands, Lanzarote and Fuerteventura. It occurs in relatively moist woodland habitats, including laurel woods, cloud forest zones and pine woods.
