= Erysimum merxmuelleri =

Scientific classification
- Kingdom: Plantae
- Clade: Tracheophytes
- Clade: Angiosperms
- Clade: Eudicots
- Clade: Rosids
- Order: Brassicales
- Family: Brassicaceae
- Genus: Erysimum
- Species: E. merxmuelleri

Binomial name
- Erysimum merxmuelleri Polatschek

Synonyms
- Erysimum nevadense subsp. merxmuelleri (Polatschek) P.W.Ball

Species of flowering plant

Erysimum merxmuelleri is a biennial or short-lived perennial plant native from eastern Portugal to western Spain. It has been treated as one of a complex of six species making up the nevadense group, or as Erysimum nevadense subsp. merxmuelleri.

== Taxonomy ==
Erysimum merxmuelleri was one of a number of new Erysimum species first described by Adolf Polatschek in 1979. Six of these, including E. merxmuelleri, were considered to be closely related and were reduced to subspecies of E. nevadense in Flora Europaea, a decision explained by Peter William Ball in 1990. The six were treated as separate species making up the E. nevadense group or complex in Flora Iberica in 1993. A molecular phylogenetic study published in 2014 included four of the species, although not E. merxmuelleri. The study did not support the view that the four were closely related, and authors concluded that the E. nevadense group did not have phylogenetic support.
