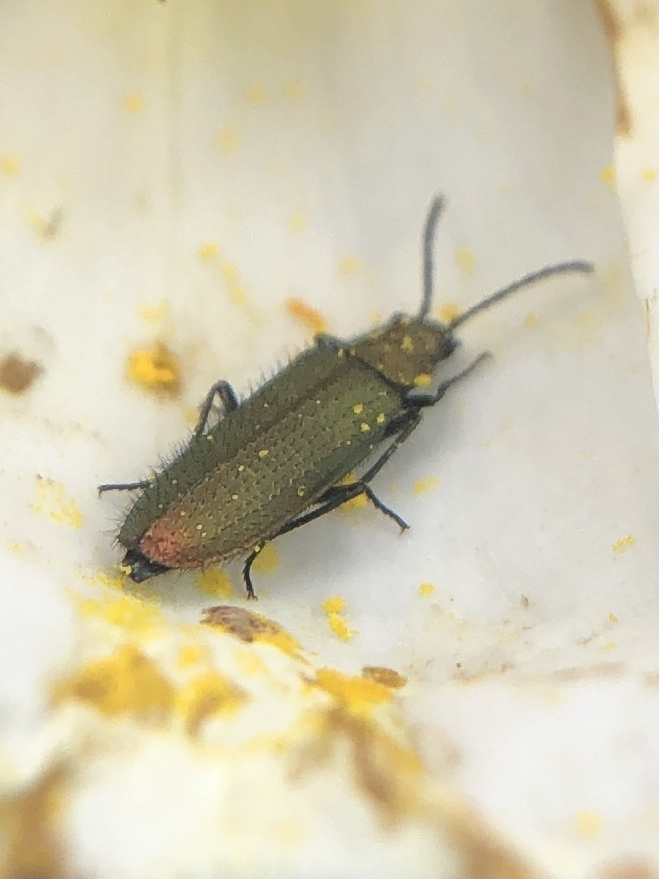
- Lobonyx aeneus from Spain

Scientific classification
- Kingdom: Animalia
- Phylum: Arthropoda
- Clade: Pancrustacea
- Class: Insecta
- Order: Coleoptera
- Suborder: Polyphaga
- Infraorder: Cucujiformia
- Family: Prionoceridae
- Genus: Lobonyx
- Species: L. aeneus

Binomial name
- Lobonyx aeneus (Fabricius, 1798)

Synonyms
- Lagria aenea Fabricius, 1787

= Lobonyx aeneus =

Species of beetle

Lobonyx aeneus is a species of soft-winged flower beetles in the family Prionoceridae. It is found in the Iberian Peninsula and North Africa.
