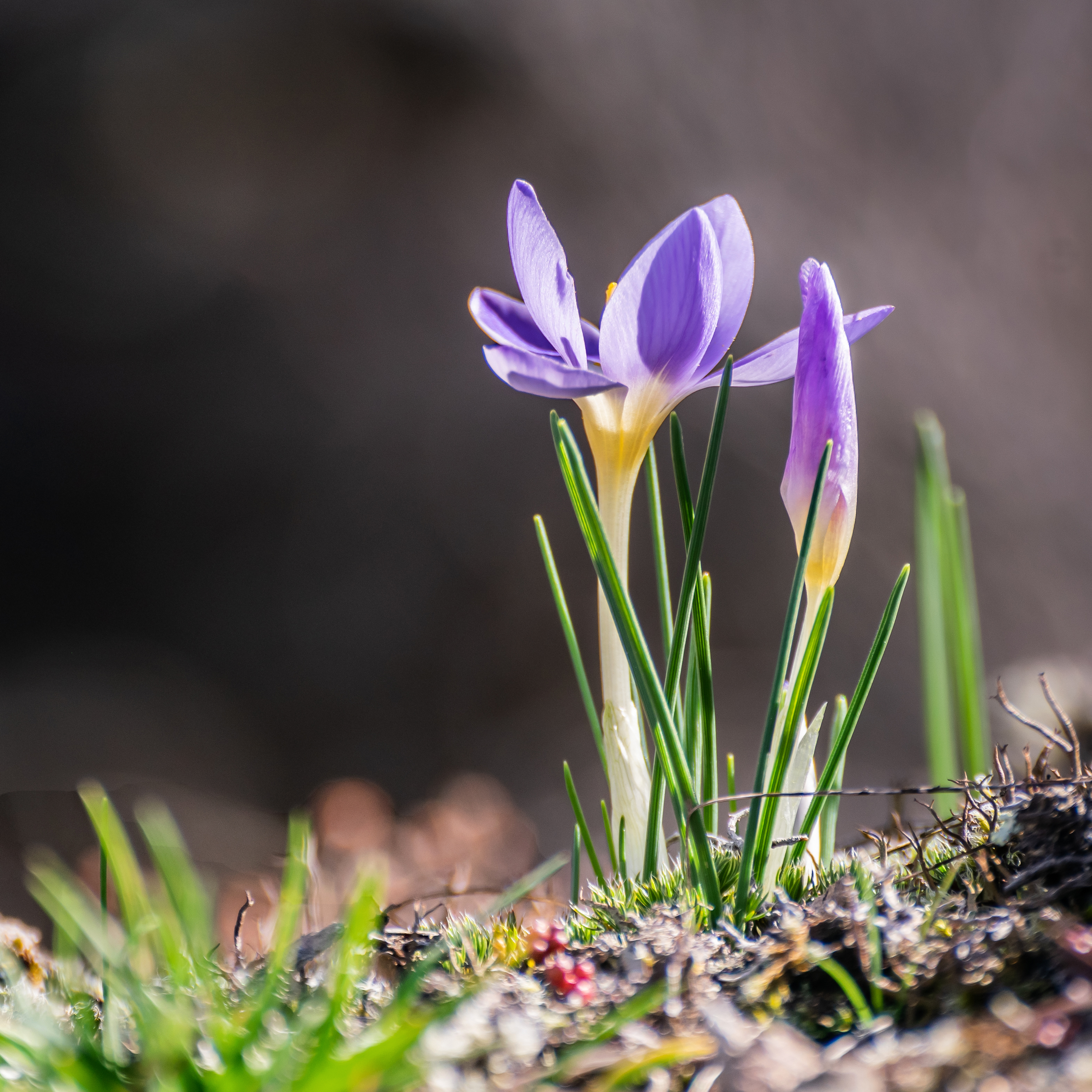

Scientific classification
- Kingdom: Plantae
- Clade: Tracheophytes
- Clade: Angiosperms
- Clade: Monocots
- Order: Asparagales
- Family: Iridaceae
- Genus: Crocus
- Species: C. carpetanus

Binomial name
- Crocus carpetanus Boiss. & Reut.

= Crocus carpetanus =

Species of plant in the family Iridaceae

Crocus carpetanus is a species of flowering plant in the Iridaceae family. It is native to Portugal and Spain.
