= Erysimum gomez-campoi =

Scientific classification
- Kingdom: Plantae
- Clade: Tracheophytes
- Clade: Angiosperms
- Clade: Eudicots
- Clade: Rosids
- Order: Brassicales
- Family: Brassicaceae
- Genus: Erysimum
- Species: E. gomez-campoi

Binomial name
- Erysimum gomez-campoi Polatschek

Synonyms
- Erysimum nevadense subsp. gomez-campoi (Polatschek) P.W.Ball

Species of flowering plant

Erysimum gomez-campoi (also spelt Erysimum gomezcampoi) is a short-lived biennial or perennial plant native to southern Spain. It has been treated as one of a complex of six species making up the nevadense group, or as Erysimum nevadense subsp. gomez-campoi.

== Taxonomy ==
Erysimum gomez-campoi was one of a number of new Erysimum species first described by Adolf Polatschek in 1979. Six of these, including E. gomez-campoi, were considered to be closely related and were reduced to subspecies of E. nevadense in Flora Europaea, a decision explained by Peter William Ball in 1990. The six were treated as separate species making up the E. nevadense group or complex in Flora Iberica in 1993. A molecular phylogenetic study published in 2014 included four of the species, including E. gomez-campoi. The study did not support the view that the four were closely related, and authors concluded that the E. nevadense group did not have phylogenetic support.
