= List of Apolysis species =

This is a list of species in Apolysis, a genus of bee flies in the family Bombyliidae.

== Apolysis species ==
- Apolysis acrostichalis (Melander, 1946)^{i c g}
- Apolysis albella Zaitzev, 1972^{c g}
- Apolysis albopilosa (Cole, 1923)^{c g}
- Apolysis analis (Melander, 1946)^{i c g}
- Apolysis andalusiaca (Strobl, 1898)^{c g}
- Apolysis anomala (Hesse, 1975)^{c g}
- Apolysis anthonoma (Melander, 1946)^{i c g}
- Apolysis arcostichalis (Melander, 1946)^{c g}
- Apolysis atra (Cresson, 1915)^{i c g}
- Apolysis beijingensis Yang & Yang^{g}
- Apolysis bicolor (Melander, 1946)^{i c g}
- Apolysis bifaria Melander^{i c g}
- Apolysis bilineata (Melander, 1946)^{i c g}
- Apolysis bivittata (Cresson, 1915)^{i c g}
- Apolysis brachycera Hesse, 1975^{c g}
- Apolysis brevirostris Hesse, 1938^{c g}
- Apolysis capax (Coquillett, 1892)^{i c g}
- Apolysis capicola Hesse, 1975^{c g}
- Apolysis chalybea (Melander, 1946)^{i c g}
- Apolysis cinctura (Coquillett, 1894)^{i c g}
- Apolysis cinerea (Seguy, 1926)^{c g}
- Apolysis cingulata Hesse, 1938^{c g}
- Apolysis cockerelli (Melander, 1946)^{i c g}
- Apolysis colei (Melander, 1946)^{i c g}
- Apolysis comosa (Melander, 1946)^{i c g}
- Apolysis corollae Greathead, 1966^{c g}
- Apolysis crisis Evenhuis, 1990^{c g}
- Apolysis disjuncta Melander, 1946^{i c g}
- Apolysis dissimilis (Melander, 1946)^{i c g}
- Apolysis distincta (Melander, 1946)^{i c g}
- Apolysis divisa (Melander, 1946)^{i}
- Apolysis dolichorostris Evenhuis & Greathead, 1999^{c g}
- Apolysis dolorosa (Melander, 1946)^{i c g}
- Apolysis druias Melander, 1946^{i c g}
- Apolysis elegans (Hesse, 1938)^{c g}
- Apolysis eremitis (Melander, 1946)^{i c g}
- Apolysis eremophila Loew, 1873^{c g}
- Apolysis fasciola (Coquillett, 1892)^{i c g}
- Apolysis flavifemoris (Hesse, 1975)^{c g}
- Apolysis flavipleurus (Bowden, 1964)^{c g}
- Apolysis forbesi Evenhuis and Hall, 1983^{i}
- Apolysis formosa (Cresson, 1915)^{i c g}
- Apolysis fumalis Hesse, 1938^{c g}
- Apolysis fumata (Greathead, 1966)^{c g}
- Apolysis fumipennis (Loew, 1844)^{c g}
- Apolysis glabrifrons Gharali & Evenhuis^{g}
- Apolysis glauca Melander, 1946^{i c g}
- Apolysis gobiensis (Zaitzev, 1975)^{c}
- Apolysis hesseana Evenhuis, 1990^{c g}
- Apolysis hirtella Hesse, 1975^{c g}
- Apolysis humbug (Evenhuis, 1985)^{i}
- Apolysis humilis Loew, 1860^{c g}
- Apolysis instabilis (Melander, 1946)^{i c g}
- Apolysis irwini Hall, 1976^{c g}
- Apolysis knabi (Cresson, 1915)^{i c g}
- Apolysis lactearia Hesse, 1975^{c g}
- Apolysis langemarki (Francois, 1969)^{c g}
- Apolysis langenarki (Francois, 1969)^{c g}
- Apolysis lasia (Melander, 1946)^{i c g}
- Apolysis leberi Evenhuis, 1983^{i c g}
- Apolysis linderi Hesse, 1962^{c g}
- Apolysis longirostris (Melander, 1946)^{i c g}
- Apolysis loricata (Melander, 1946)^{i c g}
- Apolysis lugens (Melander, 1946)^{i c g}
- Apolysis maculata (Melander, 1946)^{i c g}
- Apolysis maherniaphila Hesse, 1938^{c g}
- Apolysis major Zaitzev, 1975^{c g}
- Apolysis marginalis (Cresson, 1915)^{i c g}
- Apolysis maskali Greathead, 1966^{c g}
- Apolysis matutina (Melander, 1946)^{i c g}
- Apolysis melanderella Evenhuis, 1990^{i c g}
- Apolysis minuscula Hesse, 1975^{c g}
- Apolysis minutissima Melander, 1946^{i c g}
- Apolysis mitis (Cresson, 1915)^{i c g}
- Apolysis mohavea Melander, 1946^{i c g}
- Apolysis montana (Melander, 1946)^{i c g}
- Apolysis monticola Hesse, 1975^{c g}
- Apolysis montivaga Francois, 1969^{c g}
- Apolysis mus (Bigot, 1886)^{i c g}
- Apolysis namaensis (Hesse, 1938)^{c}
- Apolysis neuter (Melander, 1946)^{i c g}
- Apolysis nigricans (Tabet and Hall, 1987)^{i c g}
- Apolysis obscura (Cresson, 1915)^{i c g}
- Apolysis oreophila Hesse, 1975^{c g}
- Apolysis ornata (Engel, 1932)^{c g}
- Apolysis palpalis (Melander, 1946)^{i c g}
- Apolysis pannea (Melander, 1946)^{i c g}
- Apolysis parkeri (Melander, 1946)^{i c g}
- Apolysis petiolata Melander, 1946^{i c g}
- Apolysis polius (Melander, 1946)^{i c g}
- Apolysis puberula (Hesse, 1975)^{c g}
- Apolysis pulchra (Melander, 1946)^{i c g}
- Apolysis pullata (Melander, 1946)^{i c g}
- Apolysis pusilla (Paramonov, 1929)^{c}
- Apolysis pusilloides Gharali & Evenhuis^{g}
- Apolysis pygmaeus (Cole, 1923)^{i c g}
- Apolysis quebradae Hall, 1976^{c g}
- Apolysis quinquenotata (Johnson, 1903)^{i c g}
- Apolysis retrorsa (Melander, 1946)^{i c g}
- Apolysis scapularis (Melander, 1946)^{i c g}
- Apolysis scapulata (Melander, 1946)^{i c g}
- Apolysis seminitens Hesse, 1975^{c g}
- Apolysis setosa (Cresson, 1915)^{i c g}
- Apolysis sigma (Coquillett, 1902)^{i c g b}
- Apolysis sipho (Melander, 1946)^{i c g}
- Apolysis speculifera (Melander, 1946)^{i c g}
- Apolysis stuckenbergi Hesse, 1975^{c g}
- Apolysis superba (Engel, 1933)^{c g}
- Apolysis szappanosi Papp, 2005^{c g}
- Apolysis thamnophila Hesse, 1975^{c g}
- Apolysis thornei Hesse, 1938^{c g}
- Apolysis timberlakei Melander, 1946^{i c g}
- Apolysis togata (Melander, 1946)^{i c g}
- Apolysis tomentosa (Engel, 1932)^{c g}
- Apolysis trifida (Melander, 1946)^{i c g}
- Apolysis triseritella (Hesse, 1975)^{c g}
- Apolysis trochila (Coquillett, 1894)^{i c g}
- Apolysis trochilides (Williston, 1901)^{i c g}
- Apolysis xanthogaster Hesse, 1938^{c g}
- Apolysis zaitzevi Evenhuis, 1990^{c g}
- Apolysis zzyzxensis (Evenhuis, 1985)^{i c g}

Data sources: i = ITIS, c = Catalogue of Life, g = GBIF, b = Bugguide.net
