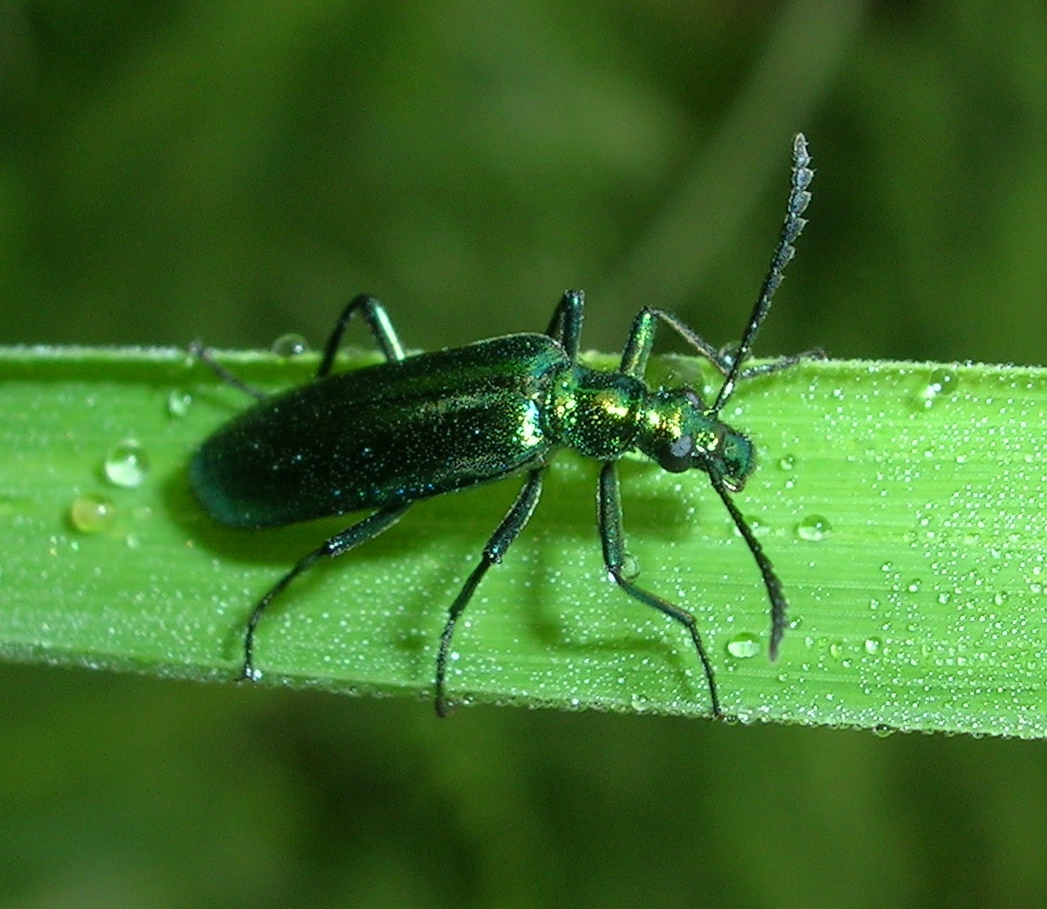
- Idgia belli from India

Scientific classification
- Kingdom: Animalia
- Phylum: Arthropoda
- Clade: Pancrustacea
- Class: Insecta
- Order: Coleoptera
- Suborder: Polyphaga
- Infraorder: Cucujiformia
- Superfamily: Cleroidea
- Family: Prionoceridae; Lacordaire, 1857

= Prionoceridae =

Prionoceridae Temporal range: Middle Jurassic–Recent

Family of beetles

Prionoceridae is a small family of beetles, in the suborder Polyphaga. They form a group within the cleroid beetles and were formerly treated as a subfamily (Prionocerinae) within the family Melyridae. Very little is known of their life history but most species are pollen feeders as adults and occur in large numbers during spring or the host flowering season. Larvae are predatory or feed on decomposing wood.

== Description ==
Beetles in the family are elongate with soft elytra. The elytra are often covered with rows of hairs. The margin of the eyes are not round but notched anteriorly. The head faces forward (prognathous) and the clypeal region is produced into a short flat snout. Each of the legs have five tarsi (5-5-4 in the Oedemeridae) with simple claws and a single spur on the pro-tibia. Male Idgia and Prionocerus have a comb on the inner edge of the distal tarsal segment of the foreleg. The genera Nacerdes and Xanthochroa in the family Oedemeridae and some Cantharidae bear resemblance to some of the Prionoceridae.

Members of the family were formerly included as a subfamily within the closely related Melyridae (the genus Lobonyx in Dasytinae). The fossil record of Prionoceridae has been recorded from the Middle Jurassic Daohugou beds of China (Idgiaites jurassicus), the Cenomanian Burmese amber (Cretaidgia burmensis) and Ypresian Hat creek Amber from Canada (Prionocerites tattriei).

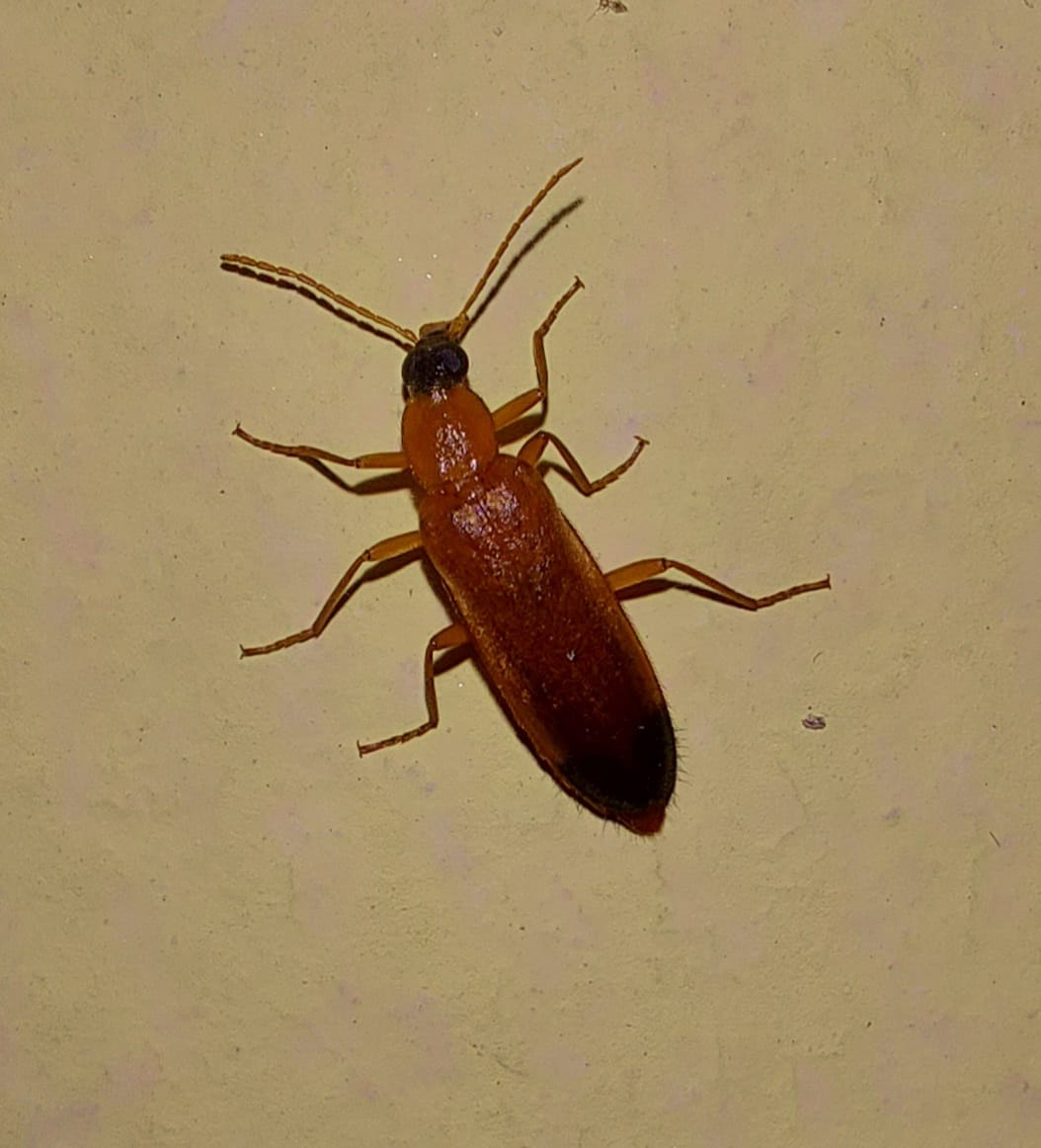
Idgia sp. from Sri Lanka

== Diversity ==
There are around 150 species in three genera; Idgia Laporte, 1836 (Palaeotropical), Lobonyx Jacquelin du Val, 1859 (mostly Palaearctic), and Prionocerus Perty, 1831.

The following is a partial list of the species that have been described (the generic placement and validity are unverified and likely to be out of date):

- †Cretaidgia Zhao, Liu & Yu, 2021
  - †C. burmensis Zhao, Liu & Yu, 2021
- Idgia Laporte, 1836
  - See genus article
- †Idgiaites
  - †I. jurassicus
- Lobonyx Jacquelin du Val, 1859
  - L. aeneus (Fabricius, 1787)
  - L. gracilis Reitter, 1872
  - L. guerryi (Pic, 1920)
  - L. thoracicus Majer, 1990
- †Prionocerites Lawrence, Archibald, & Ślipiński, 2008
  - †P. tattriei Lawrence, Archibald, & Ślipiński, 2008
- Prionocerus Perty, 1831
  - P. bicolor Redtenbacher, 1868
  - P. caeruleipennis Perty, 1831
  - P. championi Geiser, 2010
  - P. malaysiacus Geiser, 2010
  - P. paiensis Geiser, 2010
  - P. opacipennis (Pic, 1920)
  - P. viridiflavus Geiser, 2007
  - P. wittmeri Geiser, 2010
