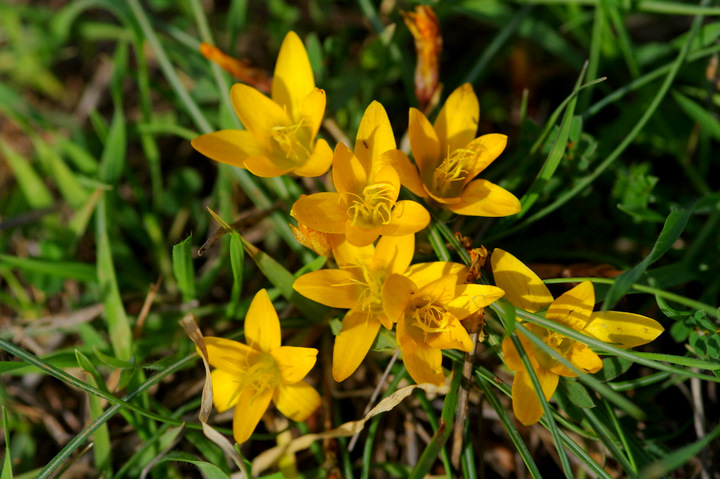

Scientific classification
- Kingdom: Plantae
- Clade: Tracheophytes
- Clade: Angiosperms
- Clade: Monocots
- Order: Asparagales
- Family: Iridaceae
- Genus: Crocus
- Species: C. graveolens

Binomial name
- Crocus graveolens Boiss. & Reut.

= Crocus graveolens =

Species of flowering plant

Crocus graveolens is a species of flowering plant in the family Iridaceae. It is native to Lebanon, Palestine, Syria, and Turkey.

Found growing around 1000 meters in stony fields, scrub, and pine forests; flowering occurs in February and March.

The flowers are yellow with finely divided stigma with around 12 threads; plants produce many narrow leaves that are grey-green. The tunic of the corms are parallel fibred, and the flowers smell like elder.
