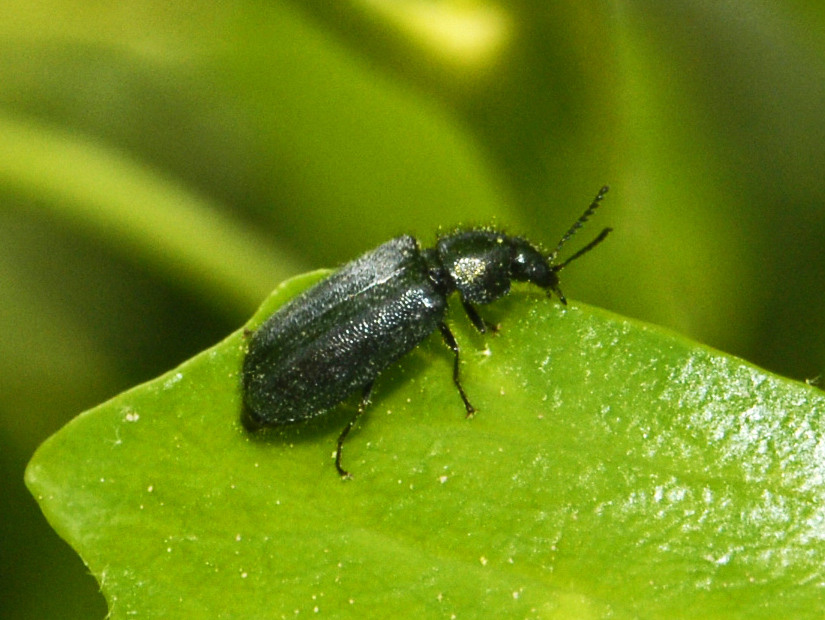
- Dasytes tristicula. Female

Scientific classification
- Kingdom: Animalia
- Phylum: Arthropoda
- Clade: Pancrustacea
- Class: Insecta
- Order: Coleoptera
- Suborder: Polyphaga
- Infraorder: Cucujiformia
- Family: Melyridae
- Genus: Dasytes
- Species: D. tristicula

Binomial name
- Dasytes tristicula Mulsant & Rey, 1868

Synonyms
- Dasytes (Hypodasytes) sublaevis Mulsant & Rey, 1868; Dasytes (Hypodasytes) occiduus Mulsant & Rey, 1870; Dasytes (Hypodasytes) mulsanti Schilsky, 1894; Dasytes (Hypodasytes) baudii Jacobson, 1913

= Dasytes tristicula =

Species of beetle

Dasytes tristicula is a species of beetles belonging to the family Melyridae. The species name is frequently misspelled as "tristiculus" in the literature.

== Distribution ==
This Mediterranean species is present in France, Italy and Spain.

== Description ==
Dasytes tristicula can reach a body length of about 4–5 mm (0.16–0.20 in). These small black beetles have long erect black pubescence over the entire surface of the elytra and pronotum. The females usually show a broad transversal band of lighter pubescence anteriorly.

== Phenology ==
Adults can be found from April to June.
