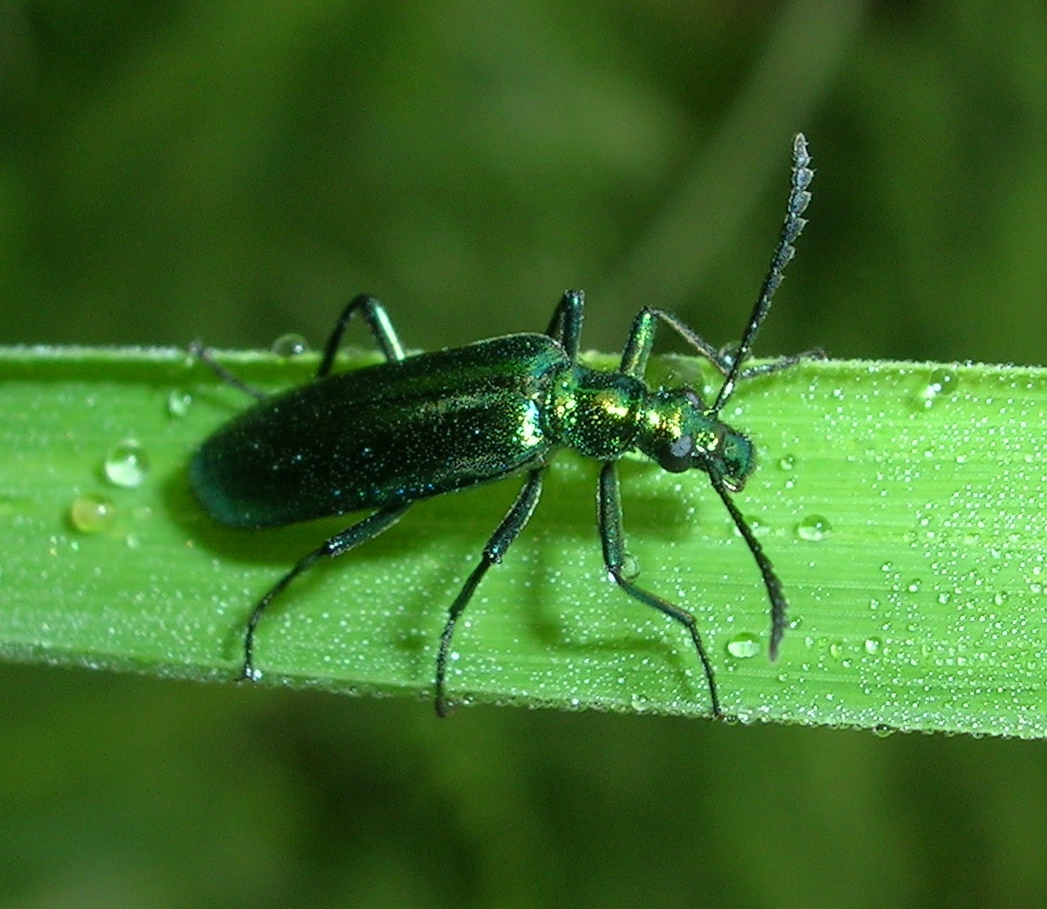
- Idgia belli from India

Scientific classification
- Domain: Eukaryota
- Kingdom: Animalia
- Phylum: Arthropoda
- Class: Insecta
- Order: Coleoptera
- Suborder: Polyphaga
- Infraorder: Cucujiformia
- Family: Prionoceridae
- Genus: Idgia; Laporte, 1836

= Idgia =

Genus of beetles

Idgia is a genus of beetles in the family Prionoceridae. They are distributed within the Old World tropics. These elongated beetles have soft elytra. Males have a comb on the inner edge of the distal tarsal segment of the foreleg.

Species that have been described in the genus include:

- I. abdominalis Pic, 1920
- I. abyssinica Champion, 1919
- I. amplipennis Pic, 1923
- I. andrewesi Bourgeois, 1907
- I. angustata Champion, 1919
- I. apicalis (Gerstacker, 1871)
- I. apicata Gorham, 1895
- I. arabica (Walker, 1871)
- I. ardesica Pic, 1908
- I. assimilis (Hope, 1831)
- I. asirensis Wittmer, 1980
- I. atricornis Pic, 1920
- I. bagorensis Pic, 1920
- I. bakeri Pic, 1920
- I. belli Gorham, 1895
- I. bimaculata Pic, 1910
- I. caeruliventris Champion, 1919
- I. cavilabris Champion, 1919
- I. chloroptera Redtenbacher, 1868
- I. cincta Pic, 1920
- I. confusa Pic, 1920
- I. costata Pic, 1920
- I. costulata Pic, 1941
- I. curticeps Pic, 1920
- I. cyanea Pic, 1906
- I. cyanocephala Champion, 1919
- I. cyanipennis Pic, 1920
- I. cyanura Champion, 1919
- I. dasytoides Champion, 1919
- I. decolor Champion, 1919
- I. deusta Fairmaire, 1878
- I. dichroa Champion, 1919
- I. dimelaena (Walker, 1859)
- I. dimidiata (Gerstacker, 1871)
- I. diversiceps Pic, 1925
- I. dohertyi Pic, 1912
- I. dubia Gyll., 1808
- I. elongaticeps Pic, 1923
- I. femorata Champion, 1919
- I. flavibuccis Bourgeois, 1892
- I. flavicollis Redtenbacher, 1878
- I. flavirostris Pascoe, 1860
- I. flavithorax Pic, 1927
- I. flavilabris Champion, 1919
- I. flavolimbata Champion, 1919
- I. foveifrons Fairmaire, 1900
- I. fruhstorferi Pic, 1920
- I. fulvicollis Reichenbach, 1849
- I. geniculata Champion, 1919
- I. gorhami Pic, 1911
- I. grandis Pic, 1935
- I. granulipennis Pic, 1920
- I. griseolineata Pic, 1934
- I. haemorrhoidalis Pic, 1906
- I. hoffmanni Gressitt, 1939
- I. huegeli (Redtenbacher, 1868)
- I. humeralifer Pic, 1920
- I. incerta Pic, 1920
- I. indicola Champion, 1919
- I. iriomoteana Nakane, 1980
- I. javana Champion, 1919
- I. laticornis Champion, 1919
- I. lineata Pic, 1920
- I. longicollis Pic, 1925
- I. longipalpis Champion, 1919
- I. longipes Pic, 1920
- I. longissima Pic, 1909
- I. luteipes Champion, 1919
- I. luzonica Pic, 1924
- I. melanocephala (Fabricius, 1781)
- I. maculicornis Pic, 1925
- I. maculiventris Champion, 1919
- I. maindroni Pic, 1909
- I. major Pic, 1908
- I. marginata Champion, 1919
- I. mindanaosa Pic, 1947
- I. melanura Kollar & Redtenbacher, 1844
- I. minuta Pic, 1920
- I. moupinensis Fairmaire, 1889
- I. nilgirica Champion, 1919
- I. nitida Champion, 1919
- I. obscurimembris Pic, 1923
- I. oculata Redtenbacher, 1868
- I. oedemeroides Pic, 1920
- I. opacipennis Pic, 1920
- I. pallidicolor Pic, 1906
- I. parlicularipes Pic, 1920
- I. particularicornis Pic, 1939
- I. plectrophora Champion, 1919
- I. revoili Pic, 1920
- I. rostrifera Champion, 1919
- I. rouyeri Pic, 1906
- I. semitecta Champion, 1919
- I. stamperi Pic, 1924
- I. subparallela Pic, 1920
- I. terminata Cast., 1840
- I. testaceipes Pic, 1908
- I. thibetana (Obenberger, 1918)
- I. uncigera Champion, 1919
- I. ungulata Champion, 1919
- I. varicornis Champion, 1919
- I. varipes Champion, 1919
- I. virescens Champion, 1919
- I. viridivittata Champion, 1919
