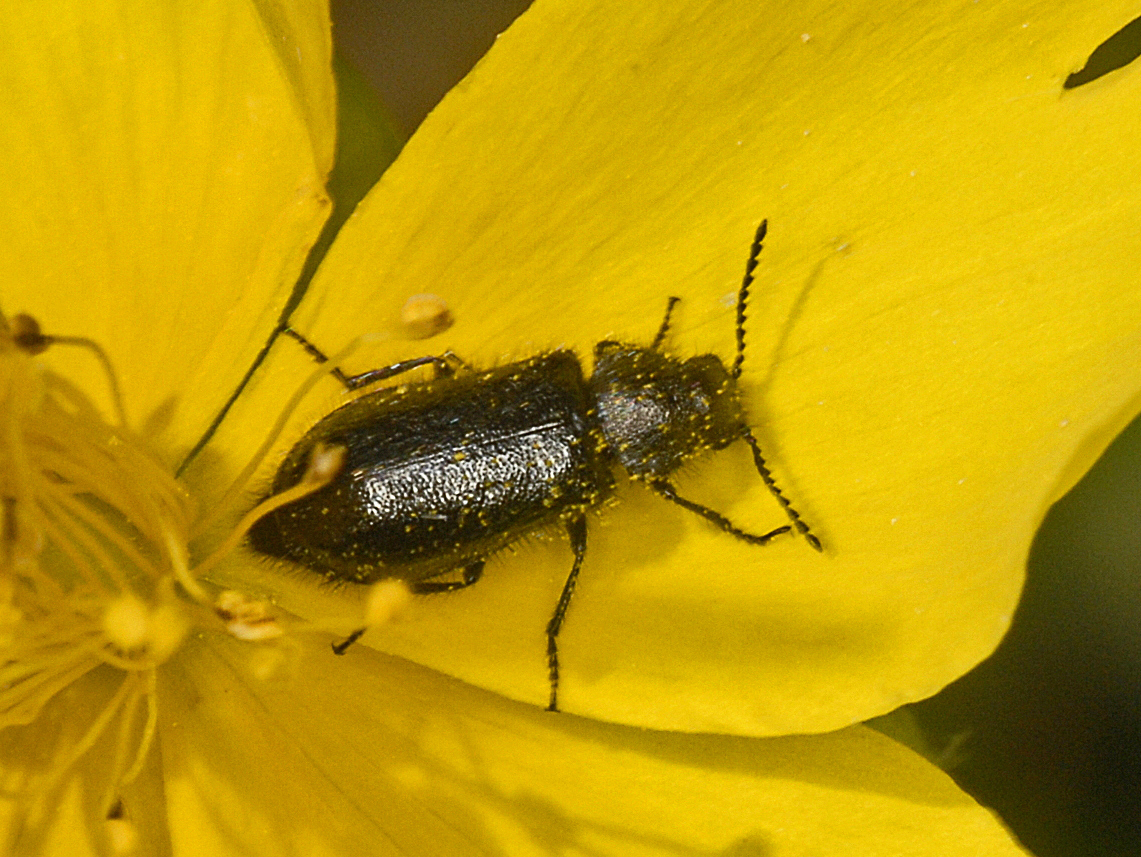
- Dasytes gonocerus. Female

Scientific classification
- Kingdom: Animalia
- Phylum: Arthropoda
- Clade: Pancrustacea
- Class: Insecta
- Order: Coleoptera
- Suborder: Polyphaga
- Infraorder: Cucujiformia
- Family: Melyridae
- Genus: Dasytes
- Species: D. gonocerus

Binomial name
- Dasytes gonocerus Mulsant & Rey, 1868

Synonyms
- Dasytes erratus Schilsky, 1895; Dasytes staudingeri Schilsky, 1897; Dasytes troglavensis Apfelbeck, 1911

= Dasytes gonocerus =

Species of beetle

Dasytes gonocerus is a species of soft wing flower beetles belonging to the family Melyridae.

== Distribution ==
This species has an extensive and discontinuous presence in part of Europe (Andorra, Bosnia and Herzegovina, Bulgaria, Croatia, Switzerland, France, Italy and Spain).

== Habitat ==
It mainly occurs at high altitude in mountainous meadows of central Spain, of the Cantabrian mountain, on the Pyrenees, on the Massif Central, in the western part of the Alps, in part of the Apennines and on several summits of the Balkans.

== Description ==
Dasytes gonocerus can reach a body length of about 4.5–5.5 mm (0.18–0.22 in). These small black beetles have long erect black pubescence over the entire surface of the elytra and pronotum.

This species is very similar to Dasytes alpigradus and Dasytes lombardus. The three species are morphologically very close and only the males can be differentiated with certainty after examination of their reproductive organs (aedeagus).

== Phenology ==
Adults can be found from July to September. These beetles feed on pollen and can be found especially on yellow Asteraceae.
