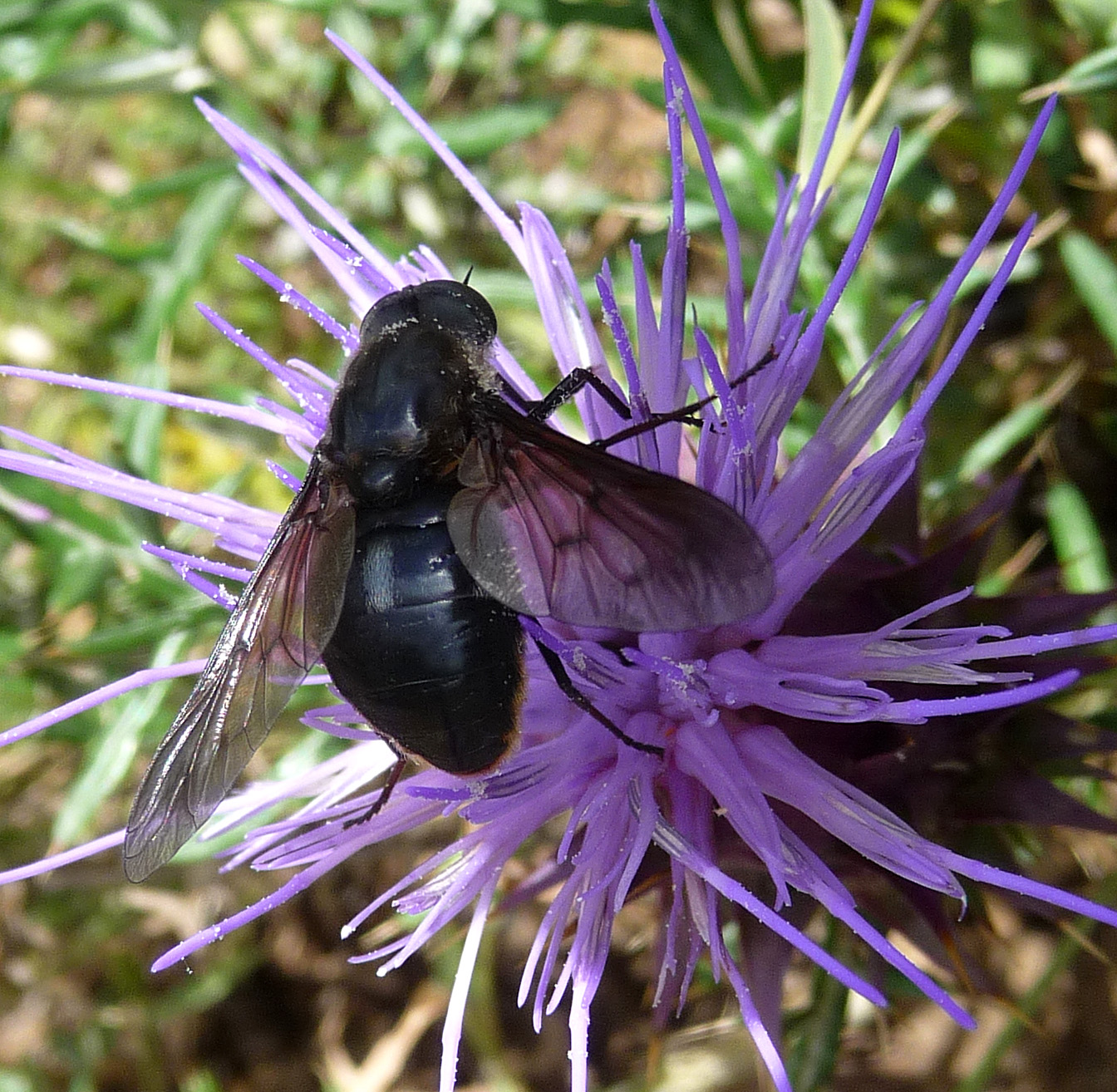

Scientific classification
- Domain: Eukaryota
- Kingdom: Animalia
- Phylum: Arthropoda
- Class: Insecta
- Order: Diptera
- Family: Bombyliidae
- Subfamily: Usiinae; Becker

Tribes
- Apolysini Evenhuis; Usiini Becker

= Usiinae =

Subfamily of flies

Usiinae is a subfamily of bee flies in the family Bombyliidae. There are at least 3 genera and 180 described species in Usiinae.

== Genera ==
These three genera belong to the subfamily Usiinae:

- Apolysis Loew, 1860^{i c g b}
- Parageron Paramonov, 1929^{c g}
- Usia Latreille, 1802^{c g}

Data sources: i = ITIS, c = Catalogue of Life, g = GBIF, b = Bugguide.net
