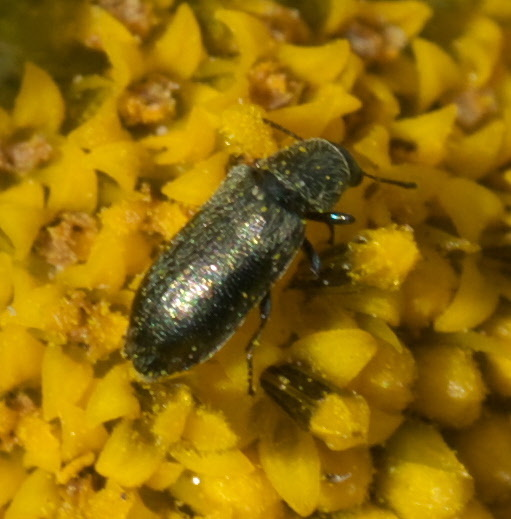
- Listrus senilis

Scientific classification
- Kingdom: Animalia
- Phylum: Arthropoda
- Class: Insecta
- Order: Coleoptera
- Suborder: Polyphaga
- Infraorder: Cucujiformia
- Family: Melyridae
- Subfamily: Dasytinae
- Genus: Listrus; Motschulsky, 1859

= Listrus =

Genus of beetles

Listrus is a genus of soft-winged flower beetles in the tribe Listrini. These beetles are pollinators and often found in flowers during spring and summer.

== Description ==
Adult Listrus are around 3 mm in body length. They are cylindrical, often gray, and sometimes have a pattern of spots on their elytra.

== Taxonomy ==
Listrus includes the following species:

- Listrus gentry
- Listrus cephalicus
- Listrus canescens
- Listrus caseyi
- Listrus balteellus
- Listrus glabratus (Hatch, 1962)
- Listrus medicatus (Blaisdell, 1927)
- Listrus robustus (Blaisdell, 1937)
- Listrus amplicollis
- Listrus bifasciatus
- Listrus angulatus
- Listrus anacapensis
- Listrus quadricollis (Hatch, 1962)
- Listrus annulatus
- Listrus plenus (Casey, 1895)
- Listrus senilis (LeConte, 1852)
- Listrus confusus (Casey, 1895)
- Listrus interruptus
- Listrus olympianus (Blaisdell, 1921)
- Listrus provincialis (Blaisdell, 1921)
- Listrus lanei
