= Apolysis sigma =

Scientific classification
- Domain: Eukaryota
- Kingdom: Animalia
- Phylum: Arthropoda
- Class: Insecta
- Order: Diptera
- Family: Bombyliidae
- Genus: Apolysis
- Species: A. sigma

Binomial name
- Apolysis sigma (Coquillett, 1902)

Synonyms
- Geron sigma Coquillett, 1902

Species of fly

Apolysis sigma is a species of bee fly in the family Bombyliidae. It is widespread in North America.
