= Erysimum deflexum =

Conservation status
- Critically Imperiled (NatureServe)

Scientific classification
- Kingdom: Plantae
- Clade: Tracheophytes
- Clade: Angiosperms
- Clade: Eudicots
- Clade: Rosids
- Order: Brassicales
- Family: Brassicaceae
- Genus: Erysimum
- Species: E. deflexum

Binomial name
- Erysimum deflexum J. D. Hooker & Thomson

Species of plant

Erysimum deflexum, the bent treacle mustard, is a herbaceous plant, a member of the family Brassicaceae.

== Description ==
The stems are 20 to 25 centimetres tall, and flowers are 1.5 to 2 centimetres across.

== Distribution ==
It is a native species to East Himalayas.

== Taxonomy ==
It was named by Joseph Dalton Hooker, and George Thomson, in J. Proc. Linn. Soc., Bot. 5: 165. in 1861.
