= Apolysis (fly) =

Scientific classification
- Kingdom: Animalia
- Phylum: Arthropoda
- Clade: Pancrustacea
- Class: Insecta
- Order: Diptera
- Family: Bombyliidae
- Subfamily: Usiinae
- Genus: Apolysis; Loew, 1860

Diversity
- 118 species

Genus of flies

Apolysis is a genus of bee flies in the family Bombyliidae. There are almost 120 described species in Apolysis.

== See also ==
- List of Apolysis species
