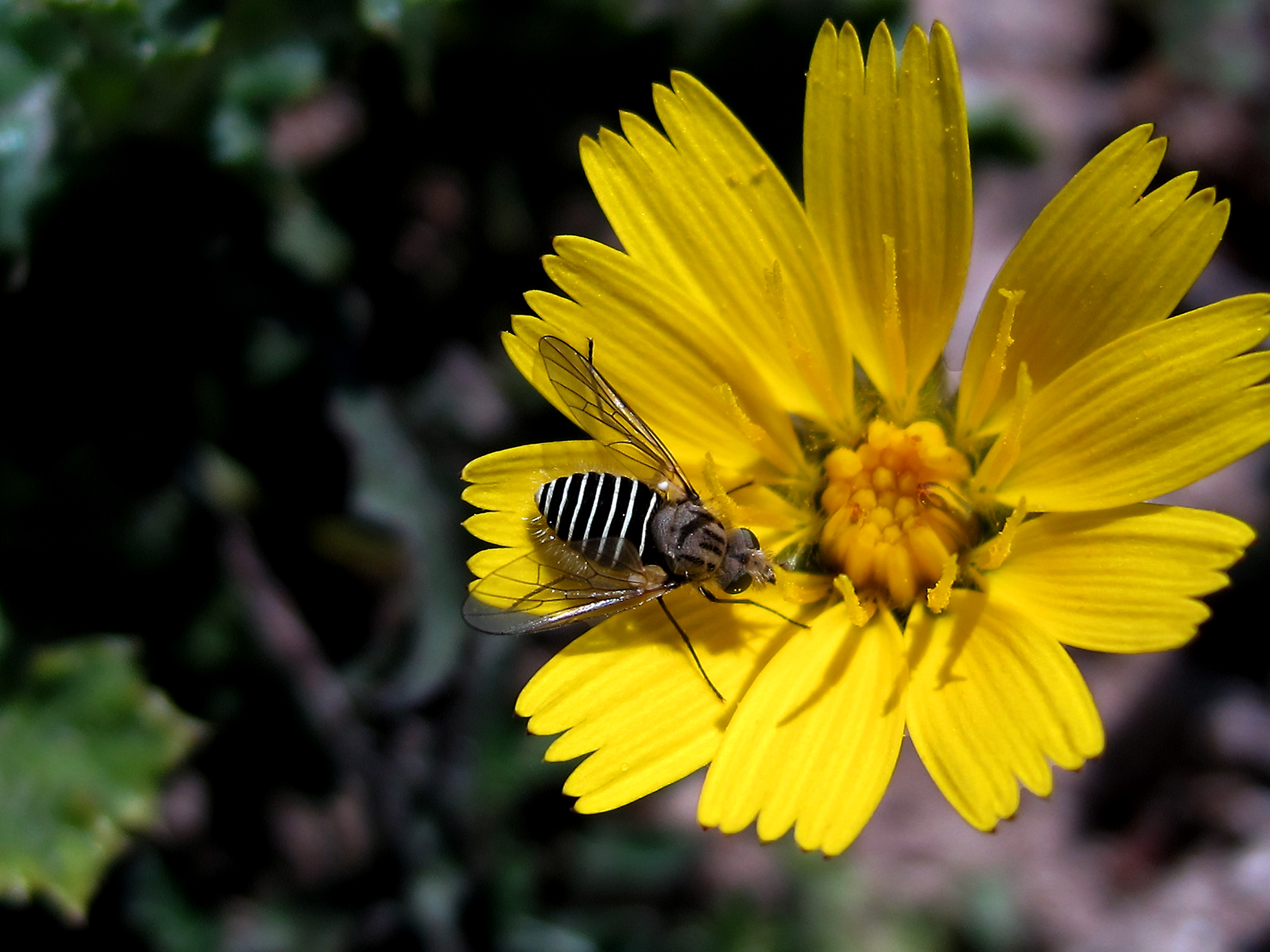

Scientific classification
- Kingdom: Animalia
- Phylum: Arthropoda
- Class: Insecta
- Order: Diptera
- Family: Bombyliidae
- Subfamily: Usiinae
- Tribe: Usiini
- Genus: Parageron; Paramonov, 1929

= Parageron =

Genus of flies

Parageron is a genus of bee flies within the family Bombyliidae. Members of this genus can be found in Europe.

== Species ==
- Parageron additivaneura Carles-Tolrá 2009
- Parageron aurata (Macquart, 1848)
- Parageron beijingensis Yang & Yang, 1994
- Parageron dimonicus Zaitzev, 1996
- Parageron emeljanovi Zaitzev, 1975
- Parageron erythraeus (Greathead, 1967)
- Parageron grata (Loew, 1856)
- Parageron griseus Paramonov, 1947
- Parageron incisa (Wiedemann, 1830)
- Parageron lutescens (Bezzi, 1925)
- Parageron major (Macquart, 1840)
- Parageron minor (Efflatoun, 1945)
- Parageron modestus (Loew, 1873)
- Parageron negevi Zaitzev, 1996
- Parageron punctipennis (Loew, 1846)
- Parageron raydahensis El-Hawagry & Al Dhafer 2016
- Parageron turkmenicus Paramonov, 1947
- Parageron volkovitshi Zaitzev, 1996
- Parageron zimini Paramonov, 1947
