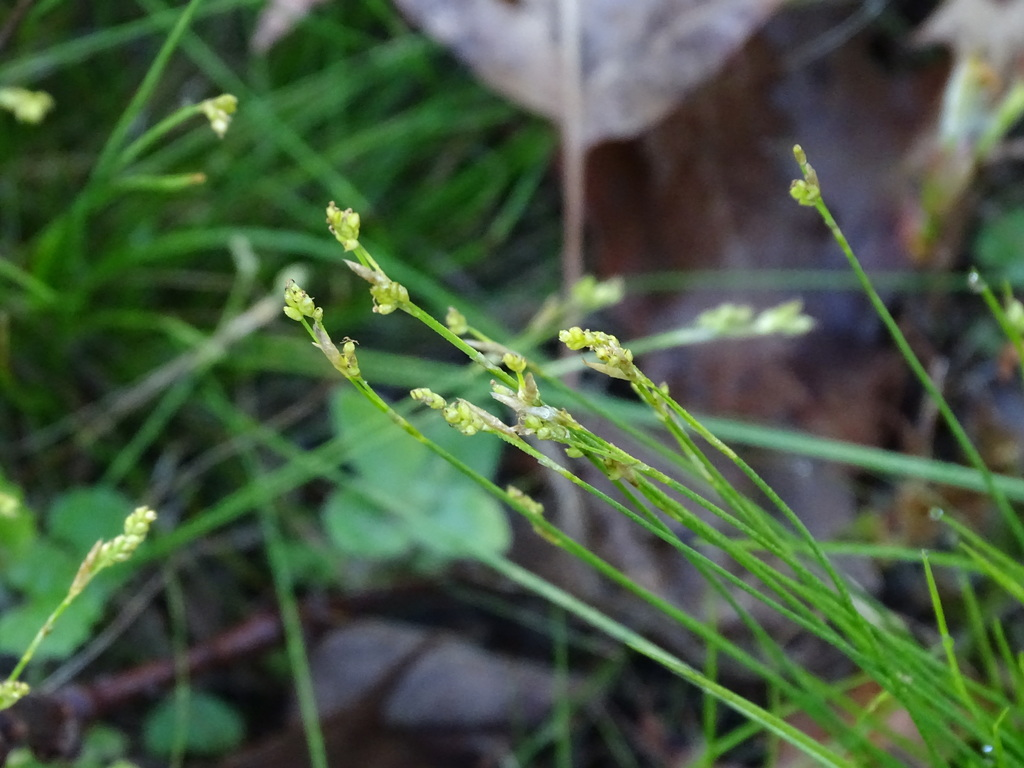

Conservation status
- Secure (NatureServe)

Scientific classification
- Kingdom: Plantae
- Clade: Tracheophytes
- Clade: Angiosperms
- Clade: Monocots
- Clade: Commelinids
- Order: Poales
- Family: Cyperaceae
- Genus: Carex
- Subgenus: Carex subg. Carex
- Section: Carex sect. Albae
- Species: C. eburnea

Binomial name
- Carex eburnea Boott

= Carex eburnea =

Species of grass-like plant

Carex eburnea, known as ivory sedge, ebony sedge, and bristleleaf or bristle-leaved sedge, is a small and slender sedge native to North America, from Alaska and Newfoundland south to central Mexico (San Luis Potosí and Querétaro).

== Description ==
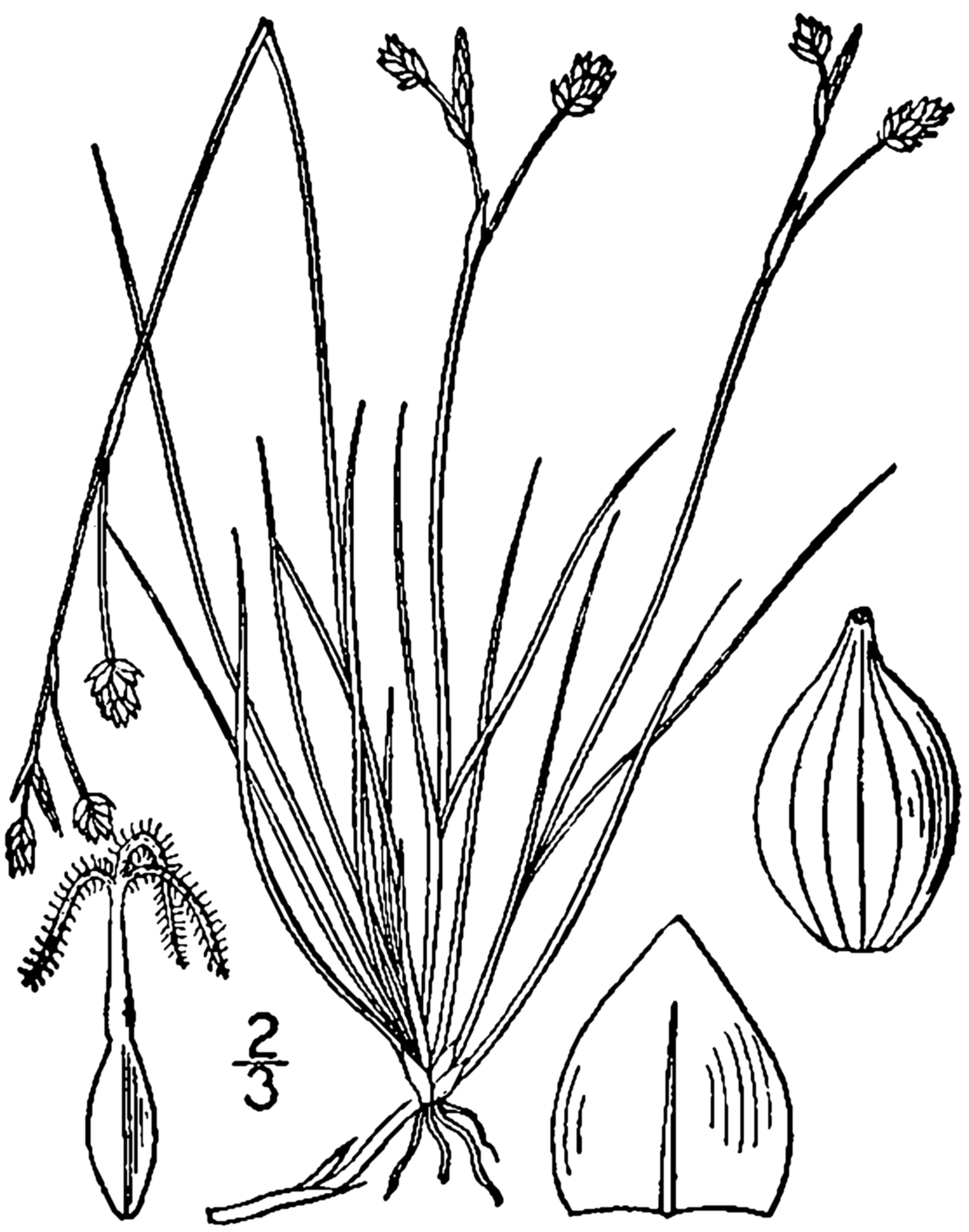
illustration

Ivory sedge is a clump-forming sedge that spreads gradually by slender, light brown rhizomes to form colonies. It has narrow leaves, 0.2 to 1 mm (0.008 to 0.039 in) wide and 3 to 21 cm (1 to 8 in) long, that grow from the base of the plant and alternately on the culms (stems). The culms are longer than the leaves, 7 to 31 cm (2 3/4 to 12 1/4 in) long. The bases of the leaves and culms are wrapped in a light brown sheath. The leaves dry up after the growing season and persist at least until the next spring.

Each inflorescence (flower cluster), at the end of a culm, has one staminate (male) spike above two to three pistillate (female) spikes, each enclosed at the base by a tubular bract. There are 3 to 10 florets in each pistillate spike. The scales under the florets are white and translucent.

Pollinated florets produce three-sided seeds (achenes) that are glossy blackish-brown when ripe, 1.5–2.2 mm (0.059–0.087 in) long by 0.7–1.1 mm (0.028–0.043 in) wide. The stem of the inflorescence and the stems of the pistillate spikes are very short at blooming time, but lengthen a great deal by the time the seed matures, so that the clusters of achenes overtop the withered staminate spike and the stem is always longer than the leaves.

== Distribution and habitat ==
Ivory sedge usually grows in coniferous or mixed woodlands, sometimes in fens, stable dunes, or alvar (shallow soil above limestone). It prefers sandy or gravelly soil with a neutral to alkaline pH.
