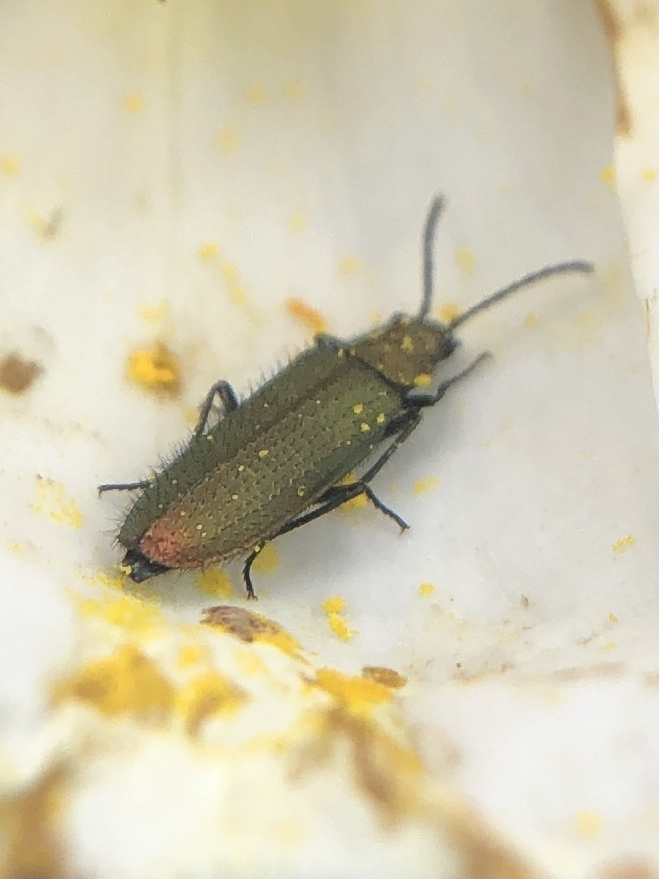
- Lobonyx aeneus, Spain

Scientific classification
- Domain: Eukaryota
- Kingdom: Animalia
- Phylum: Arthropoda
- Class: Insecta
- Order: Coleoptera
- Suborder: Polyphaga
- Infraorder: Cucujiformia
- Family: Prionoceridae
- Genus: Lobonyx du Val, 1859

Species
- see text

= Lobonyx =

Genus of beetles

Lobonyx is a genus of soft-winged flower beetles in the family Prionoceridae. There are at least 11 described species in Lobonyx.
