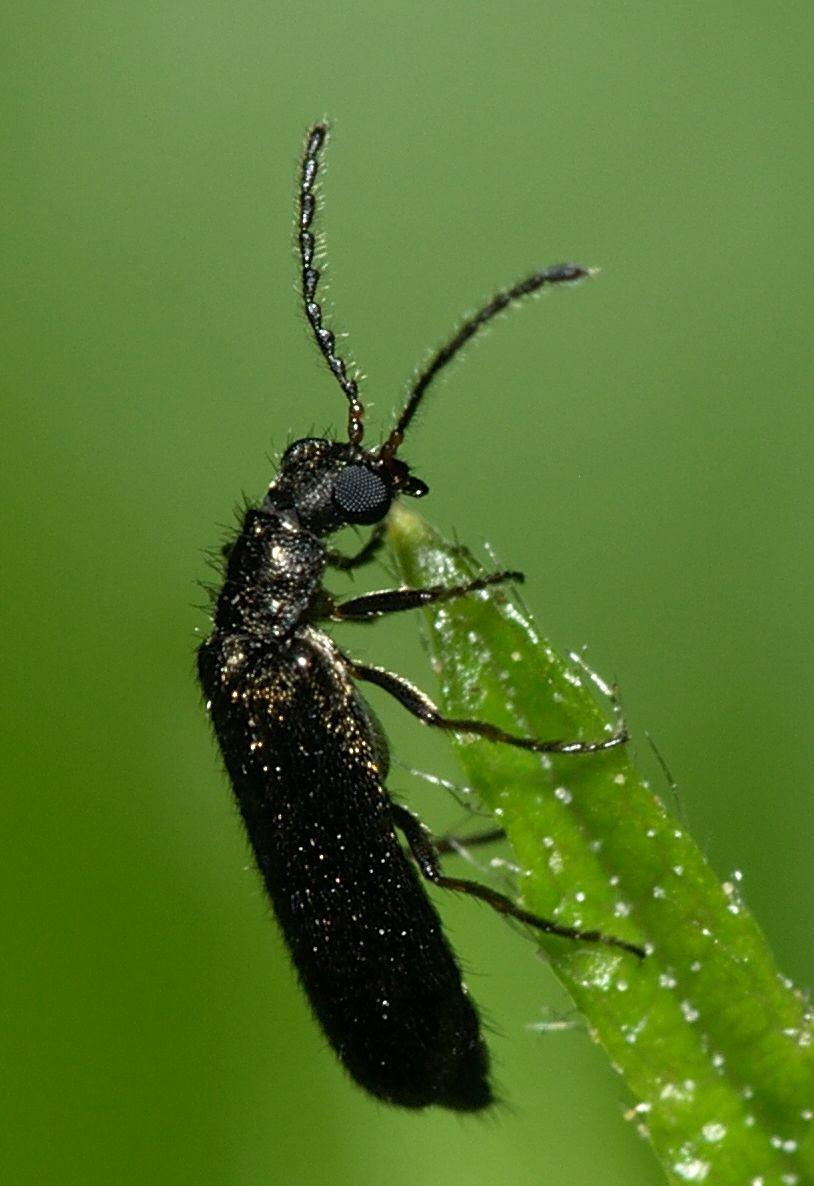
- D. plumbea

Scientific classification
- Kingdom: Animalia
- Phylum: Arthropoda
- Clade: Pancrustacea
- Class: Insecta
- Order: Coleoptera
- Suborder: Polyphaga
- Infraorder: Cucujiformia
- Family: Melyridae
- Subfamily: Dasytinae
- Genus: Dasytes; Paykull, 1799

= Dasytes =

Genus of beetles

Dasytes is a genus of beetles in the family Melyridae, especially common in the Palaearctic.

D. plumbea is one of the more common species, found on flowers, where it feeds on pollen. It is about 3 to 5 mm long.

== Nomenclature ==
Gimmel & Mayor in 2024 corrected a long-standing error in the grammatical gender of the genus name:

"The genus name Dasytes is derived from the feminine Greek noun δᾰσῠ́της (dasutes), which, when transliterated into Latin, becomes dasytes. Most, but not all, authors have treated Dasytes as masculine, unfortunately including Paykull in the original description of the genus; however, Dasytes must be considered feminine (ICZN 1999: Article 30.1.2). ... This also affects genus-group names ending in -dasytes, all of which are to be treated as feminine."

== European species ==
- D. aeneiventris
- D. aequalis
- D. aerata
- D. albosetosa
- D. alpigradus
- D. alticola
- D. baudii
- D. blascoi
- D. borealis
- D. bourgeoisi
- D. brenskei
- D. bulgarica
- D. buphtalmus
- D. caerulea
- D. calabrus
- D. canariensis
- D. coerulescens
- D. cretica
- D. croceipes
- D. dispar
- D. doderoi
- D. dolens
- D. errata
- D. flavescens
- D. fuscipes
- D. fuscula
- D. gonocerus
- D. graeculus
- D. grenieri
- D. grisea
- D. hickeri
- D. incana
- D. inexspectata
- D. israelsoni
- D. iterata
- D. korbi
- D. lanzarotensis
- D. laufferi
- D. lombardus
- D. longipennis
- D. lucana
- D. marginata
- D. metallica
- D. microps
- D. modesta
- D. moniliata
- D. monstrosipes
- D. montana
- D. montivaga
- D. moreli
- D. murina
- D. nigra
- D. nigricornis
- D. nigrita
- D. nigroaenea
- D. nigrocyanea
- D. nigropilosa
- D. nigropunctata
- D. obscura
- D. occidua
- D. oculata
- D. paupercula
- D. plumbea
- D. producta
- D. provincialis
- D. roberti
- D. setosa
- D. staudingeri
- D. striatula
- D. subacuminata
- D. subaenea
- D. subalpina
- D. subfasciata
- D. tarda
- D. terminalis
- D. thoracica
- D. timida
- D. torretassoi
- D. tristicula
- D. troglavensis
- D. variolosa
- D. virens
D. aerata on Pyrola minor

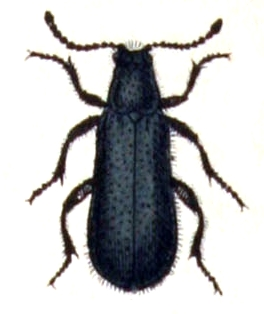
D. caerulea
