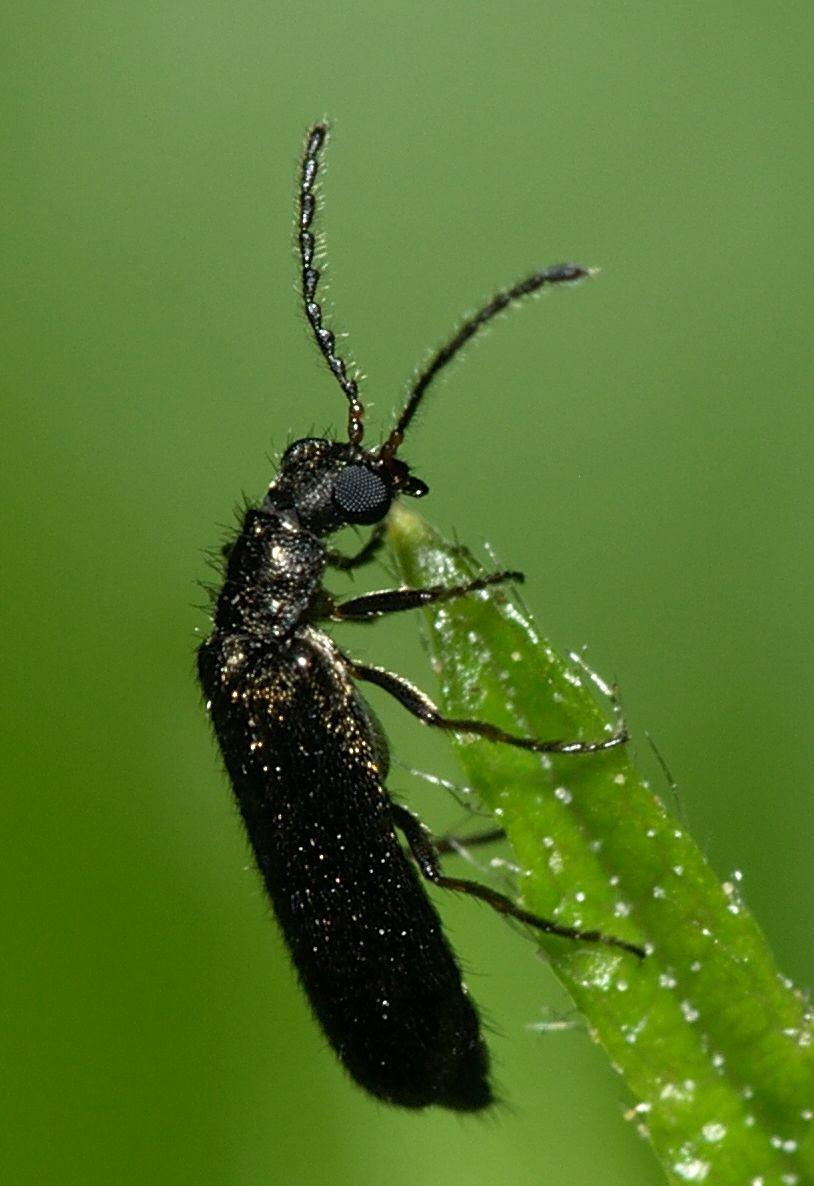

Scientific classification
- Kingdom: Animalia
- Phylum: Arthropoda
- Clade: Pancrustacea
- Class: Insecta
- Order: Coleoptera
- Suborder: Polyphaga
- Infraorder: Cucujiformia
- Family: Melyridae
- Genus: Dasytes
- Species: D. plumbea

Binomial name
- Dasytes plumbea (O. F. Müller, 1776)

= Dasytes plumbea =

European beetle introduced to N. America

Dasytes plumbea is a species of beetle that is native to the Palearctic, but has also been introduced to North America. The species name is frequently misspelled as "plumbeus" in the literature.

== Description ==
Dasytes plumbea is a small, dark beetle, highly polished with a greenish or bluish reflection, approximately 4–5 mm long. It is a pollen and nectar feeder, often transporting pollen to other flowers in the process.

== Range ==
It is common throughout central, northern, and western Europe; it has also been found in North America, mainly around Greater Vancouver.

== Habitat ==
It is usually found on flowers and shrubs along embankments and the edges of forests; adults are also found on decomposing wood, while larvae are predators there.
