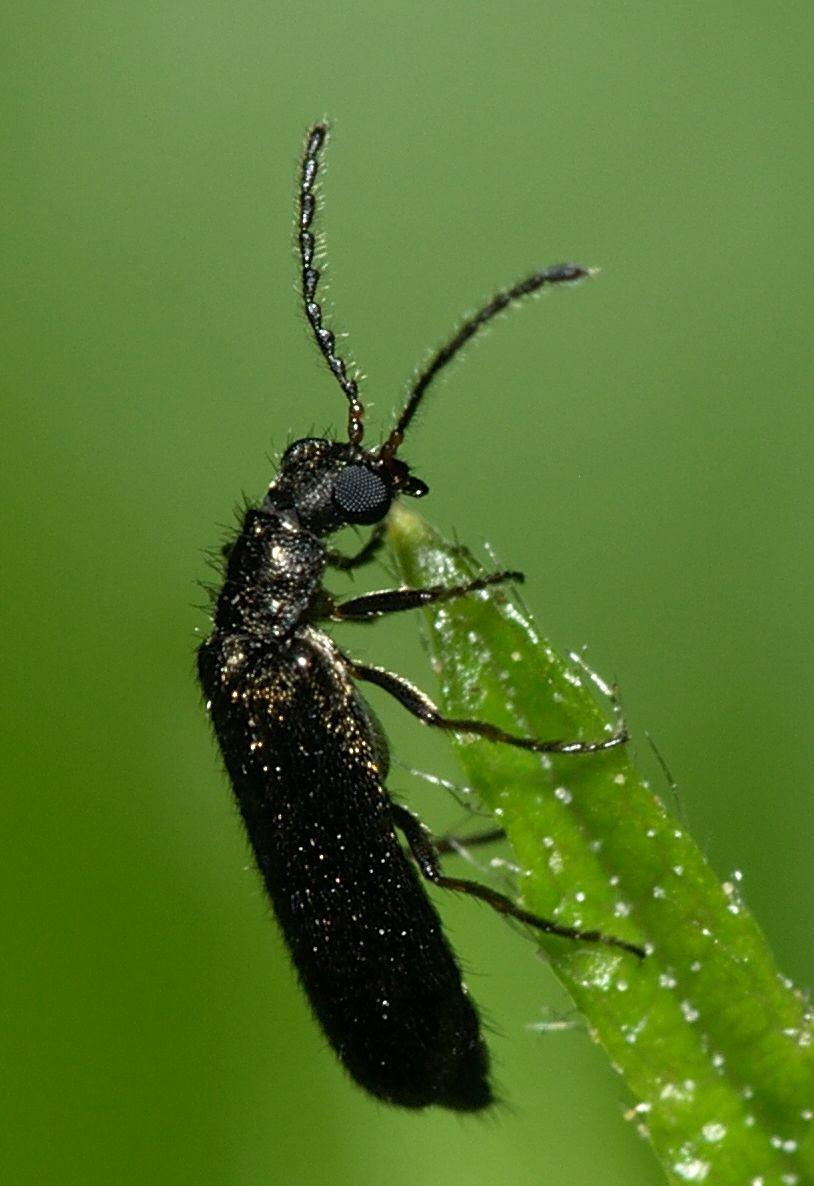
- Dasytes plumbeus

Scientific classification
- Kingdom: Animalia
- Phylum: Arthropoda
- Clade: Pancrustacea
- Class: Insecta
- Order: Coleoptera
- Suborder: Polyphaga
- Infraorder: Cucujiformia
- Family: Melyridae
- Subfamily: Dasytinae; Laporte, 1840

Tribes
- Chaetomalachiini; Danaceini; Dasytini; Eparchiini; Listrini; Vecturini

Synonyms
- Dasytidae Laporte, 1840

= Dasytinae =

Subfamily of beetles

Dasytinae is a subfamily of soft-wing flower beetles, beetles of the family Melyridae, historically sometimes treated as a separate family, "Dasytidae".

== Description and distribution ==
Dasytinae are typically small (<8 mm) and parallel-sided, with brownish to blackish integument (rarely metallic), and with or without a covering of short pubescence.

They are most common and diverse in xeric regions of North America (especially the genera Trichochrous and Listrus) and Central Asia.
