= Georges François Reuter =

French botanist and plant collector

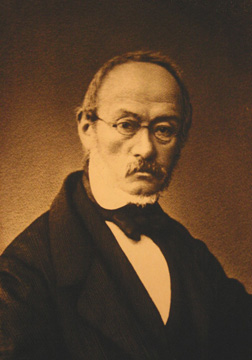
Georges François Reuters

Georges François Reuter (30 November 1805 – 23 May 1872) was a French botanist and plant collector. He was born in Paris, and died in Geneva.

Initially an engraver, in 1835 he switched vocations and dedicated his time and energy towards botany. Beginning in 1835 he worked as a curator of Augustin Pyramus de Candolle's herbarium, and from 1841 to 1849, he was curator of Pierre Edmond Boissier's herbarium. He also collaborated with Boissier on numerous projects that included various plant collection trips. From 1849 until his death, he was director of the botanical garden in Geneva.

In 1838 the botanical genus Reutera was named in his honor by Boissier.

== Published works ==
- "Diagnoses plantarum novarum hispanicarum praesertim in Castella nova lectarum" (with Pierre Edmond Boissier), 1842.
- Essai sur la végétation de la Nouvelle Castille, 1843 - Essay on the vegetation of New Castile
- "Pugillus plantarum novarum Africae borealis Hispaniaeque australis" (with Pierre Edmond Boissier), 1852.
- Quelques notes sur la végétation de l'Algérie, 1852 - Some notes on the vegetation of Algeria.
- Catalogue des plantes vasculaires qui croissent naturellement aux environs de Genéve, 1861 - Catalog of vascular plants native to the environs of Geneva.
