= Peter William Ball =

Canadian botanist (born 1932)

Peter William Ball (born 1932 in Croydon, UK) is an English-born botanist, plant collector, and plant taxonomist, specializing in caricology (the study of the genus Carex).

After completing his O-Levels in 1948, Ball studied at Whitgift School, where he was taught by Cecil Thomas Prime, co-author of The Shorter British Flora (1948). In 1952 Ball matriculated at the University of Leicester, where he studied under Tom G. Tutin. Ball graduated from the University of Leicester with a B.Sc. in 1955 and a Ph.D. in 1960. While he was a graduate student, he worked with Tutin on a revision of Salicornia for the second edition of Flora of the British Isles (1962). As a graduate student, he also worked, with the support of a Leverhulme Fellowship, from 1957 to 1959 at the University of Liverpool on the Flora Europaea project. After obtaining his doctorate he worked until 1969 on the Flora Europeae project with the support of a research fellowship.

As part of this Ball was also involved in producing a checklist for the flora of Albania, at the time there was no published flora giving reliable records for that region. For both his Salicornia work and for the Flora Europaea Ball undertook many collecting trips in both Britain and in southern Europe, visiting Greece in 1961, former Yugoslavia (south-west Serbia in particular) in 1963 and Spain (Almeria) in 1967.

He collected botanical specimens in Cheshire in 1960 and in Merionethshire in 1961.

Ball became in 1970 a professor of botany at the University of Toronto Mississauga (UTM), where he retired as professor emeritus. He is the author or co-author of many scientific articles, most of which deal with the genus Carex. He contributed to and co-edited, with Anton A. Reznicek and David F. Murray, the Cyperaceae section of the Flora of North America. Ball also contributed three articles to volume 4 of the Flora of North America.

== Selected publications ==
- Reznicek, A. A.; Ball, P. W. (1974). "The taxonomy of Carex series Lupulinae in Canada". Canadian Journal of Botany. 52 (11): 2387–2399. doi:10.1139/b74-310. ISSN 0008-4026.
- Reznicek, A. A.; Ball, P. W. (1979). "The Status of Two New England "Endemic" Carices: Carex Elachycarpa and C. Josselynii (Cyperaceae)". Taxon. 28 (1–3): 217–223. doi:10.2307/1219580. hdl:2027.42/149729. JSTOR 1219580.
- Webber, J. M.; Ball, P. W. (1979). "(472-473) Proposals to Reject Carex rosea and Carex radiata of Eastern North America (Cyperaceae)". Taxon. 28 (5/6): 611. doi:10.2307/1219824. JSTOR 1219824.
- Webber, J. M.; Ball, P. W. (1980). "Introgression in Canadian Populations of Lycopus Americanus Muhl. And L. Europaeus L. (Labiatae)". Rhodora. 82 (830): 281–304. JSTOR 23311910.
- Webber, J. M.; Ball, P. W. (1984). "The taxonomy of the Carex rosea group (Section Phaestoglochin) in Canada". Canadian Journal of Botany. 62 (10): 2058–2073. doi:10.1139/b84-281.
- Crins, William J.; Ball, Peter W. (1987). "Variation in Carex Hostiana (Cyperaceae)". Rhodora. 89 (859): 247–259. JSTOR 23313072.
- Ford, Bruce A.; Ball, Peter W. (1988). "A Reevaluation of the Triglochin Maritimum Complex (Juncaginaceae) in Eastern and Central North America and Europe". Rhodora. 90 (863): 313–337. JSTOR 23312435.
- Crins, William J.; Ball, Peter W. (1988). "Sectional Limits and Phylogenetic Considerations in Carex Section Ceratocystis (Cyperaceae)". Brittonia. 40 (1): 38–47. doi:10.2307/2806873. JSTOR 2806873. S2CID 39085479.
- Crins, William J.; Ball, Peter W. (1989). "Taxonomy of the Carex flava complex (Cyperaceae) in North America and northern Eurasia. I. Numerical taxonomy and character analysis". Canadian Journal of Botany. 67 (4): 1032–1047. doi:10.1139/b89-137.
- Crins, William J.; Ball, Peter W. (1989). "Taxonomy of the Carex flava complex (Cyperaceae) in North America and northern Eurasia. II. Taxonomic treatment". Canadian Journal of Botany. 67 (4): 1048–1065. doi:10.1139/b89-138.
- Ball, P. W. (1990). "Some aspects of the phytogeography of Carex". Canadian Journal of Botany. 68 (7): 1462–1472. doi:10.1139/b90-185.
- Ford, Bruce A.; Ball, Peter W.; Ritland, Kermit (1991). "Allozyme Diversity and Genetic Relationships among North American Members of the Short-Beaked Taxa of Carex sect. Vesicariae (Cyperaceae)". Systematic Botany. 16 (1): 116–131. doi:10.2307/2418977. JSTOR 2418977.
- Ford, Bruce A.; Ball, Peter W. (1992). "The Taxonomy of the Circumpolar Short-Beaked Taxa of Carex sect. Vesicariae (Cyperaceae)". Systematic Botany. 17 (4): 620. doi:10.2307/2419731. JSTOR 2419731.
- Ford, Bruce A.; Ball, Peter W.; Ritland, Kermit (1993). "Genetic and macromorphologic evidence bearing on the evolution of members of Carex section Vesicariae (Cyperaceae) and their natural hybrids". Canadian Journal of Botany. 71 (3): 486–500. doi:10.1139/b93-053.
- Ball, Peter W.; Zoladz, Margaret (1994). "The Taxonomy of Carex Petricosa (Cyperaceae) and Related Species in North America". Rhodora. 96 (888): 295–310. JSTOR 23313137.
- Ball, Peter W. (1998). "Carex mckittrickensis (Cyperaceae), a New Species from Western Texas". Novon. 8 (3): 220–224. doi:10.2307/3392004. JSTOR 3392004.
- Harris, Stuart A.; Ball, Peter W. (2004). "New records of Cyperaceae and Juncaceae from the Yukon Territory". The Canadian Field-Naturalist. 118 (2): 266–267. doi:10.22621/cfn.v118i2.926.
- Crins, William J.; Ball, Peter W. (1983). "The taxonomy of the Carex pensylvanica complex (Cyperaceae) in North America". Canadian Journal of Botany. 61 (6): 1692–1717. doi:10.1139/b83-182.
