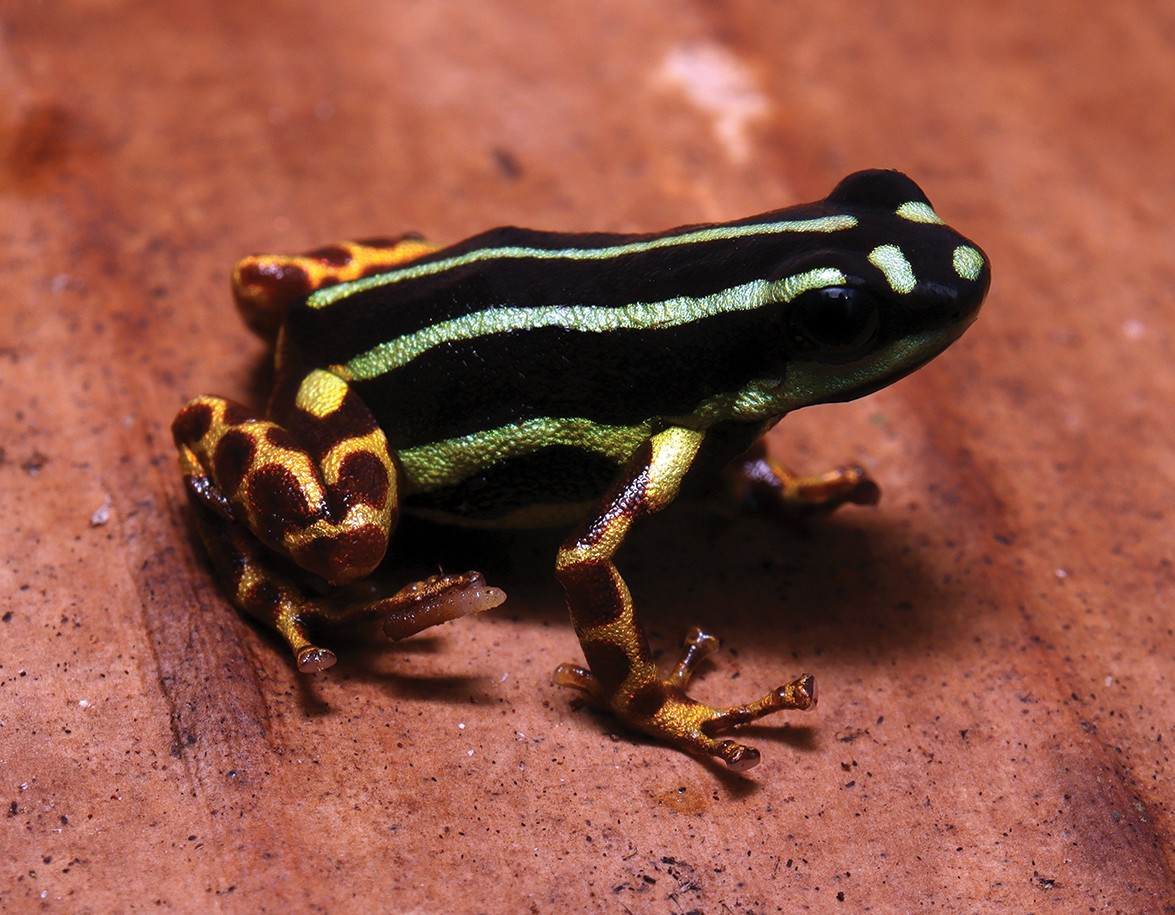

Conservation status
- Data Deficient (IUCN 3.1)

Scientific classification
- Kingdom: Animalia
- Phylum: Chordata
- Class: Amphibia
- Order: Anura
- Family: Dendrobatidae
- Subfamily: Dendrobatinae
- Genus: Ranitomeya
- Species: R. aquamarina

Binomial name
- Ranitomeya aquamarina Mônico et al., 2025
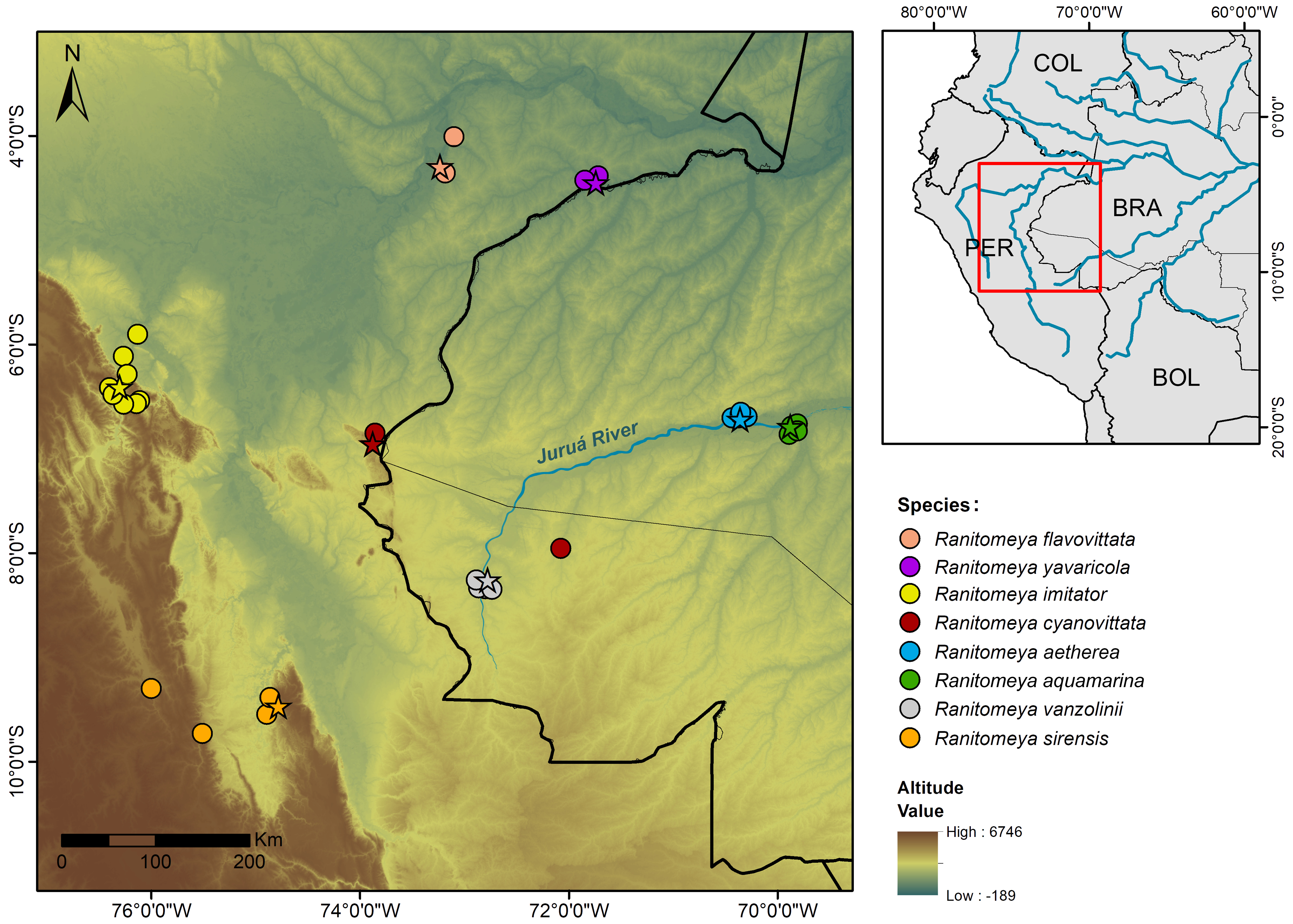
- Type locality [★] and other known localities [●] in Brazil

= Ranitomeya aquamarina =

Species of frogs

Ranitomeya aquamarina, also known as the metallic poison frog, is a species of small frog in the family Dendrobatidae endemic to the Juruá River basin of Brazil. It is one of at least 18 species named in the genus Ranitomeya and is uniquely characterized by its bright blue to yellow-green and black body and metallic spotted legs.

== Discovery ==
A series of four Rapid Assessment Program for Environmental and Long-Term Ecological Research (RAPELD) modules were recently established in the Juruá River basin of Brazil, a region of the Amazon rainforest that is poorly studied and difficult to access. After monitoring these modules through 2023 and 2024, researchers identified an unusual frog in the genus Ranitomeya. It was only observed in one of the four RAPELD sites—near the Eiru River, a tributary of the Juruá River—in Eirunepé of Amazonas, Brazil. 13 adult individuals—eight males and five females—were collected from this site for further study.

In 2023, Twomey and colleagues referred a population of frogs from a locality 60 kilometres (37 mi) south of the aforementioned RAPELD site to "Ranitomeya sp. Envira", who noted the likely novelty of this species. A 2024 review describing efforts to discover new frog species identified the RAPELD site specimens as Ranitomeya aff. sirensis.

In April 2025, Alexander T. Mônico and colleagues described Ranitomeya aquamarina as a new species of Ranitomeya based on the RAPELD site specimens. The holotype specimen, INPA-H 47568, is an adult male collected in March 2024. The other collected specimens were assigned as paratypes. The Enivra site specimens were suggested to belong to this species based on molecular similarities. A single individual photographed in 2007 by Alexander Lees 330 kilometres (210 mi) north of the type locality and reported on citizen science platform iNaturalist is also suspected to represent R. aquamarina based on morphological similarities, implying a significantly greater geographic range.

=== Etymology ===
The specific name, "aquamarina", is derived from a Latin word meaning "sea water", also referring to a gemstone and blue-green color. This name was chosen to reference both the water-like metallic shades of the animals' dorsal stripes and the philosophical value (like a gem) of the species' discovery.

== Description ==
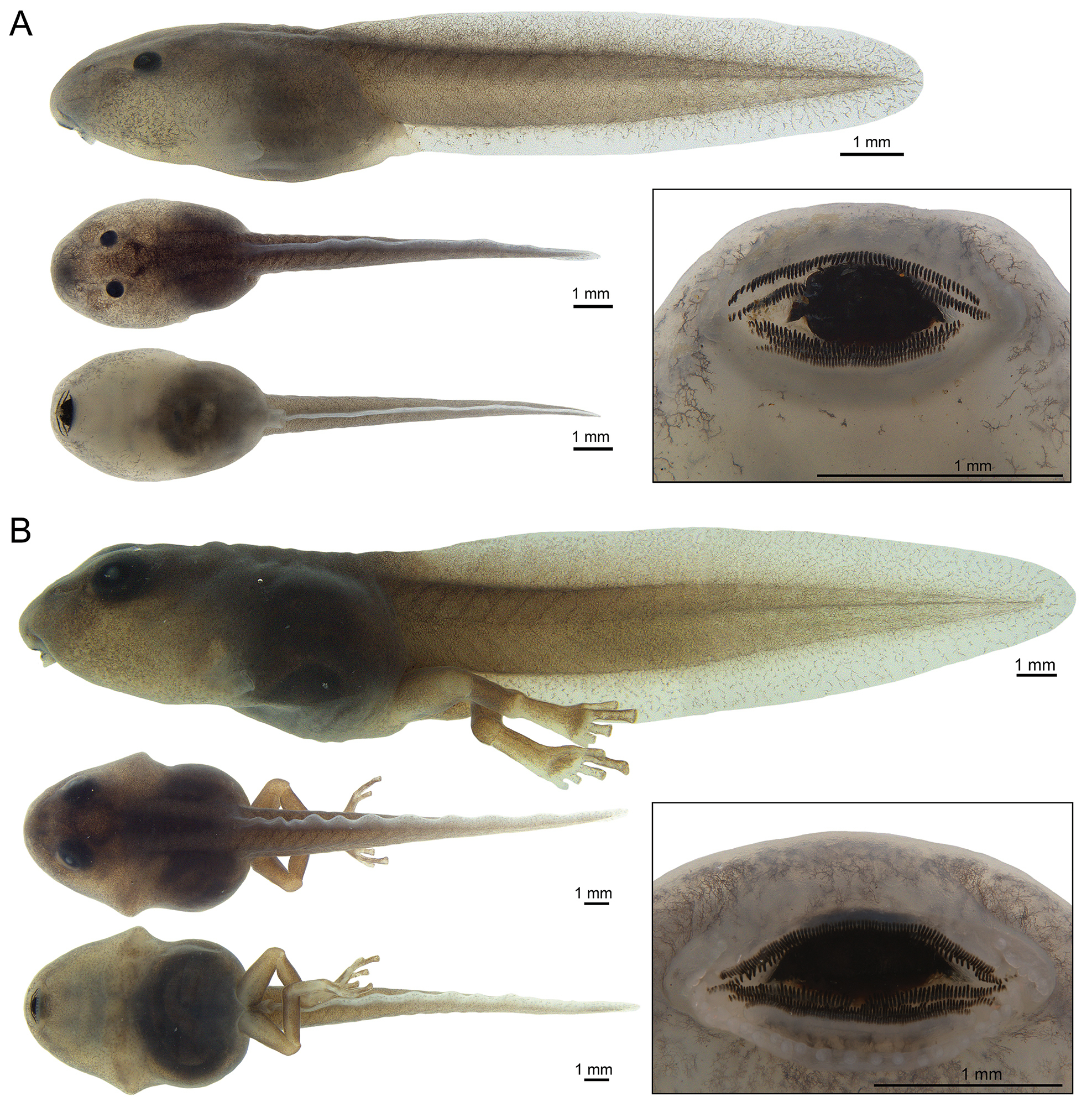
Preserved tadpoles of Ranitomeya aquamarina

Ranitomeya aquamarina is characterized by having a jet black dorsum (upper side) with three light metallic yellow-green to turquoise-green stripes running parallel from front to back. The venter (underside) is also black with a metallic olive- to yellowish-green reticulated (netlike) pattern. The gular (throat) region demonstrates a similar yellow-green color. The arms and legs are metallic orange in color, with deep carmine spots. A prominent sulfur-yellow spot is visible on the top of the thighs.

== Classification ==
In their 2025 description of Ranitomeya aquamarina, Mônico and colleagues tested the phylogenetic relationships of Ranitomeya species using Bayesian inference. They recovered R. aquamarina as the sister taxon to a clade formed by R. flavovittata and R. vanzolinii in the R. vanzolinii species group. The results of their analyses are displayed in the cladogram below.

- Ranitomeya
  - ⊞R. defleri, toraro, variabilis & reticulata species groups ⇒
    - R. defleri & R. toraro species groups
      - Ranitomeya defleri
      - - Ranitomeya toraro
        - Ranitomeya aff. toraro
    - - Ranitomeya variabilis species group
        - Ranitomeya aff. variabilis
        - - Ranitomeya variabilis
          - - Ranitomeya aff. ventrimaculata 1
            - - Ranitomeya aff. ventrimaculata 2
              - Ranitomeya amazonica
      - Ranitomeya reticulata species group
        - - Ranitomeya aff. fantastica
          - - Ranitomeya fantastica
            - - Ranitomeya benedicta
              - Ranitomeya summersi
        - - Ranitomeya uakarii
          - - Ranitomeya ventrimaculata
            - Ranitomeya reticulata
    ⊟
  - Ranitomeya vanzolinii species group
    - - Ranitomeya sirensis
      - Ranitomeya aff. sirensis
    - - - Ranitomeya imitator
        - - Ranitomeya aquamarina
          - - Ranitomeya flavovittata (sensu stricto)
            - - Ranitomeya flavovittata
              - Ranitomeya vanzolinii
      - - Ranitomeya yavaricola
        - - Ranitomeya cyanovittata
          - Ranitomeya aetherea
