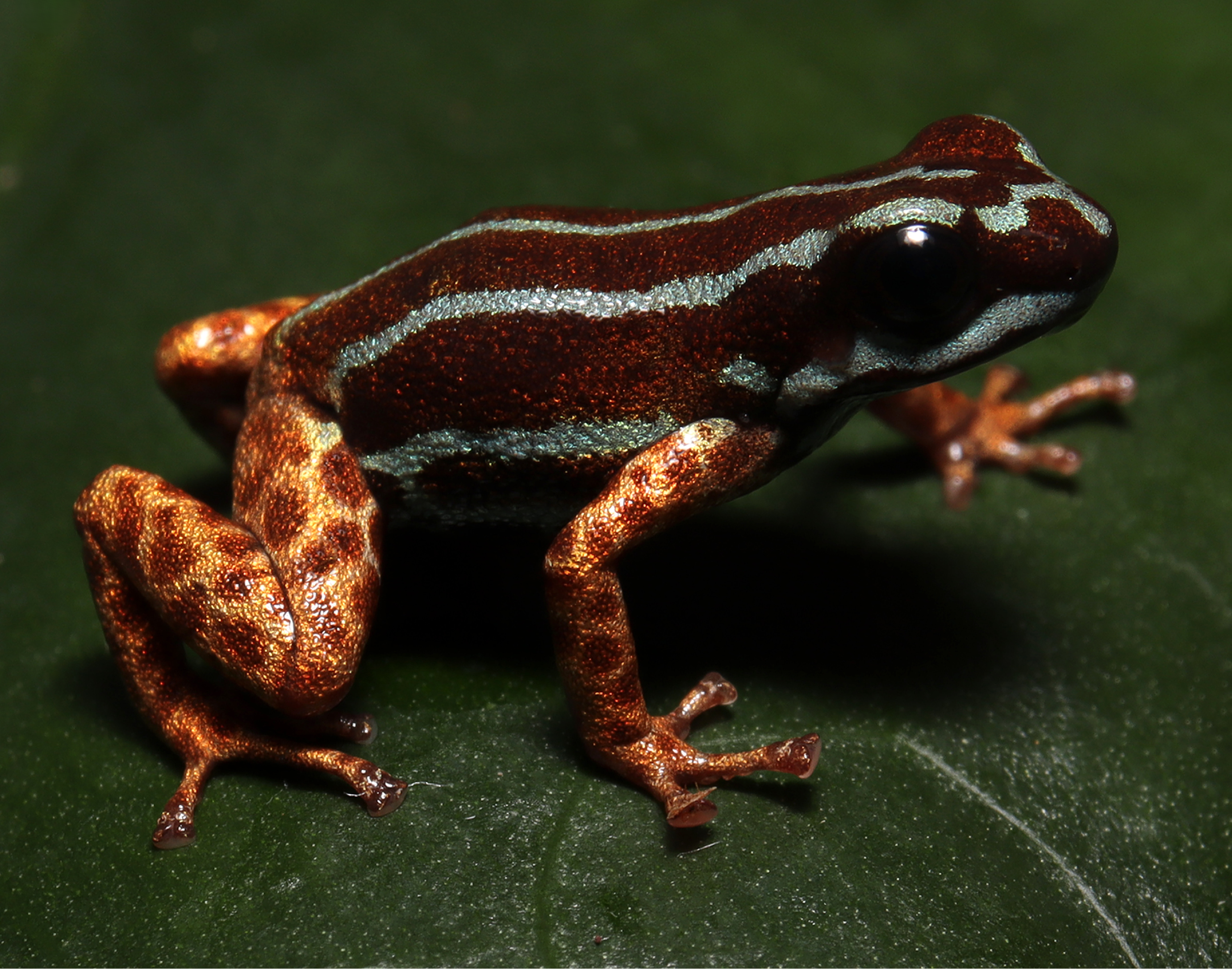

Scientific classification
- Kingdom: Animalia
- Phylum: Chordata
- Class: Amphibia
- Order: Anura
- Family: Dendrobatidae
- Subfamily: Dendrobatinae
- Genus: Ranitomeya
- Species: R. aetherea

Binomial name
- Ranitomeya aetherea Koch et al., 2025
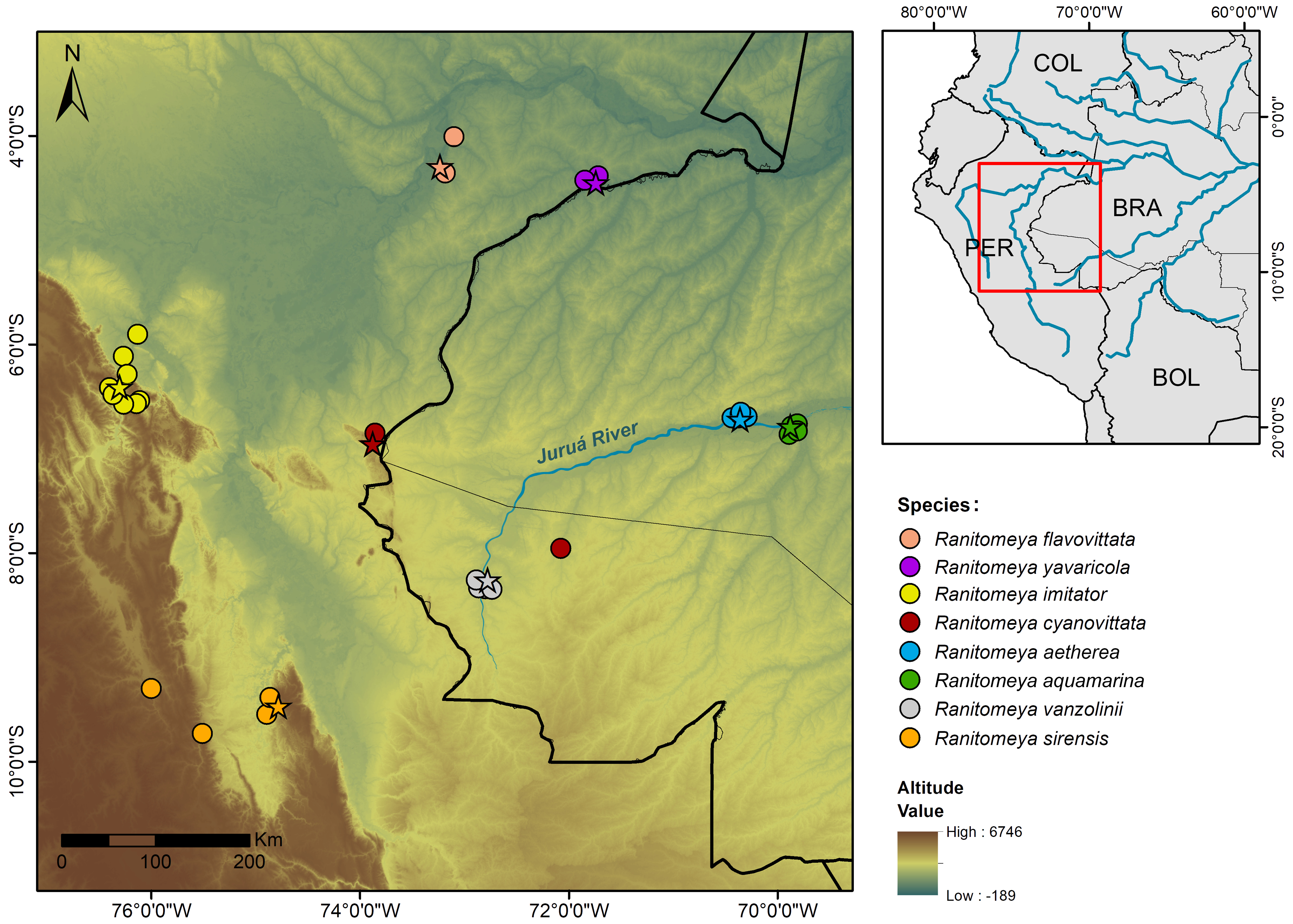
- Type locality [★] and other known localities [●] in Brazil

= Ranitomeya aetherea =

Species of frogs

Ranitomeya aetherea is a species of small frog in the family Dendrobatidae endemic to the Juruá River basin of Brazil. It is one of at least 18 species named in the genus Ranitomeya and is uniquely characterized by its light blue and dark brown body and metallic spotted legs.

== Discovery ==
A series of four Rapid Assessment Program for Environmental and Long-Term Ecological Research (RAPELD) modules were recently established in the Juruá River basin of Brazil, a region of the Amazon rainforest that is poorly studied and difficult to access. After monitoring these modules through 2023 and 2024, researchers identified an unusual frog in the genus Ranitomeya. It was only observed in one of the four RAPELD sites, in Eirunepé of Amazonas, Brazil. 26 adult individuals—nineteen males and seven females—were collected from this site for further study.

These specimens were preliminarily referred to as Ranitomeya cf. yavaricola by Twomey and colleagues in 2023, who noted their morphological similarity to this species, but noted the significant geographic separation of about 300 kilometres (190 mi) between the two populations. In contrast, Mônico and colleagues described the specimens as Ranitomeya aff. cyanovittata in their 2025 publication naming Ranitomeya aquamarina.

In May 2025, Esteban Diego Koch and colleagues described Ranitomeya aetherea as a new species of Ranitomeya based on these specimens. The holotype specimen, INPA-H 47581, is an adult male collected in March 2024. The other collected specimens were assigned as paratypes.

=== Etymology ===
The specific name, "aetherea", is derived from a Latin word meaning "heavenly". This name was chosen to reference both the blue shade of the animals' dorsal stripes and the enchanting feeling noted by the researchers who discovered the species.

== Description ==
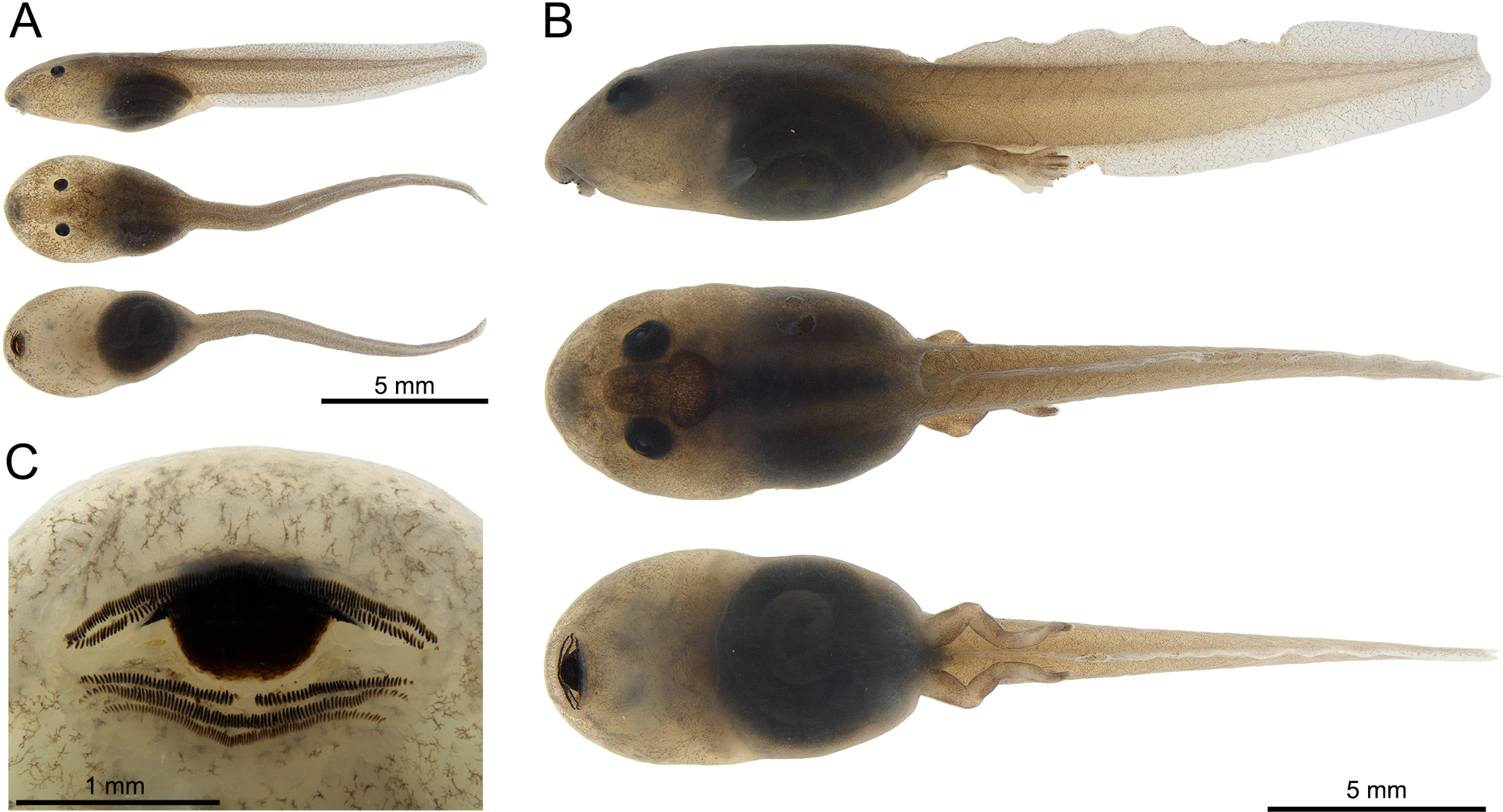
Preserved tadpoles of Ranitomeya aetherea

Ranitomeya aetherea is characterized by having a dark reddish brown dorsum (upper side) with three light blue stripes running parallel from front to back. The gular region (throat) and venter (underside) are also light blue, with dark spots. The arms and legs are metallic copper in color, with light reddish brown spots and patches of light blue at the base of each appendage. The tadpole does not exhibit the characteristic blue patterns until its final stage (stages 37–38).

== Classification ==
In their 2025 description of Ranitomeya aetherea, Koch and colleagues tested the phylogenetic relationships of Ranitomeya species using Bayesian inference. They recovered R. aetherea as the sister taxon to R. cyanovittata in a well-supported clade also including R. yavaricola in the R. vanzolinii species group. The results of their analyses are displayed in the cladogram below.

- Ranitomeya
  - ⊞ R. defleri, toraro, variabilis & reticulata species groups ⇒
    - R. defleri & R. toraro species groups
      - Ranitomeya defleri
      - - Ranitomeya toraro
        - Ranitomeya aff. toraro
    - - Ranitomeya variabilis species group
        - Ranitomeya aff. variabilis
        - - Ranitomeya variabilis
          - - Ranitomeya aff. ventrimaculata 1
            - - Ranitomeya aff. ventrimaculata 2
              - Ranitomeya amazonica
      - Ranitomeya reticulata species group
        - - Ranitomeya aff. fantastica
          - - Ranitomeya fantastica
            - - Ranitomeya benedicta
              - Ranitomeya summersi
        - - Ranitomeya uakarii
          - - Ranitomeya ventrimaculata
            - Ranitomeya reticulata
    ⊟
  - Ranitomeya vanzolinii species group
    - - Ranitomeya sirensis
      - Ranitomeya aff. sirensis
    - - - Ranitomeya imitator
        - - Ranitomeya aquamarina
          - - Ranitomeya flavovittata (sensu stricto)
            - - Ranitomeya flavovittata
              - Ranitomeya vanzolinii
      - - Ranitomeya yavaricola
        - - Ranitomeya cyanovittata
          - Ranitomeya aetherea
