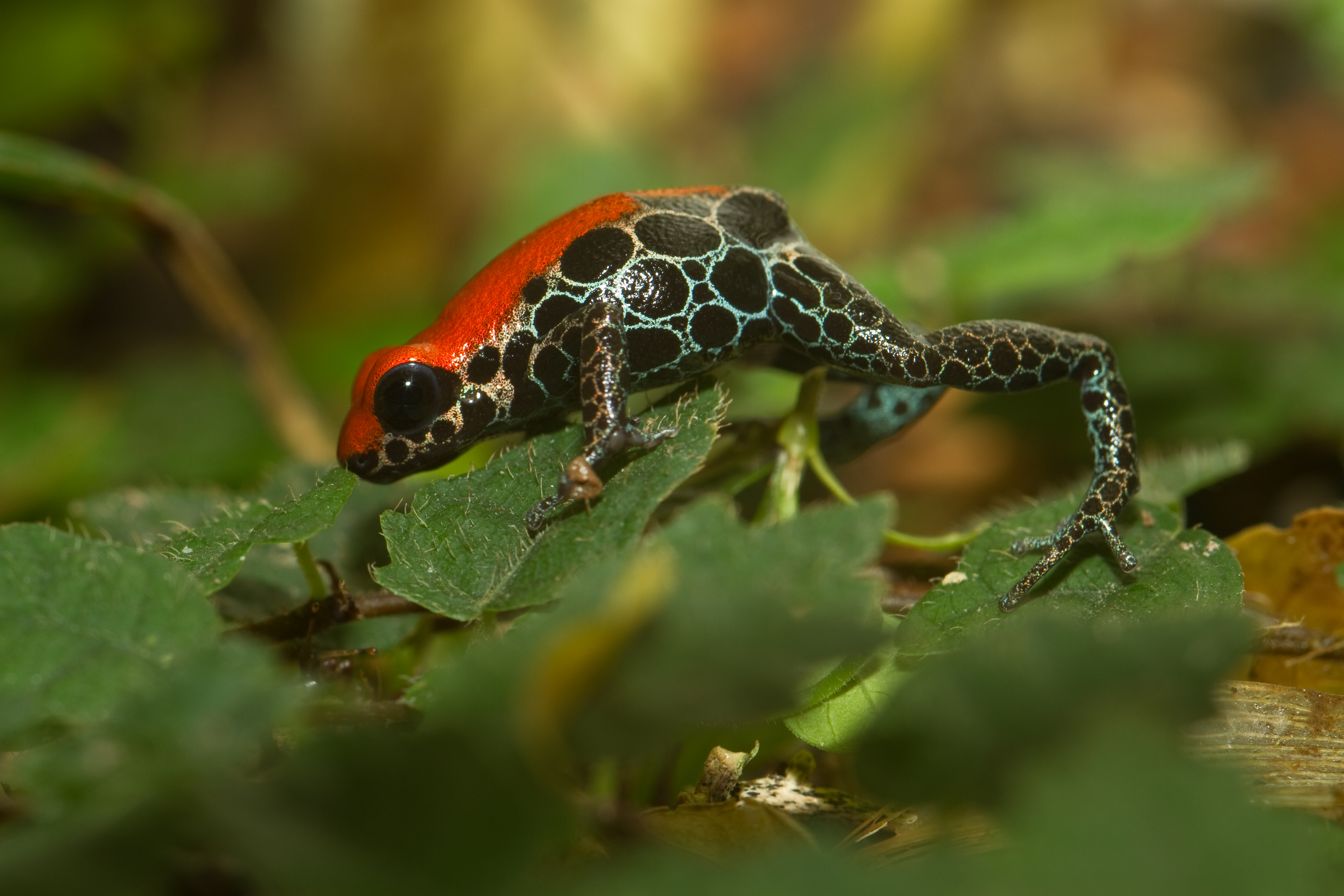

Conservation status
- Least Concern (IUCN 3.1)

Scientific classification
- Kingdom: Animalia
- Phylum: Chordata
- Class: Amphibia
- Order: Anura
- Family: Dendrobatidae
- Genus: Ranitomeya
- Species: R. reticulata

Binomial name
- Ranitomeya reticulata (Boulenger 1884)

Synonyms
- Dendrobates reticulatus

= Red-backed poison frog =

Species of amphibian

The red-backed poison frog (Ranitomeya reticulata) is a species of frog in the family Dendrobatidae. It is an arboreal insectivorous species, and is the second-most poisonous species in the genus, after R. variabilis. Like many species of small, poisonous frogs native to South America, it is grouped with the poison dart frogs, and is a moderately toxic species, containing poison capable of causing serious injury to humans, and death in animals such as chickens. R. reticulata is native to the Amazon rainforest in Peru and Ecuador.

== Poison ==
The red-backed poison frog is a moderately toxic dendrobatid, and is the second-most poisonous of the frogs in the genus Ranitomeya. Its toxins are used as the frog's natural defense mechanisms, making them inedible to many, if not most, of the predators in its natural area. To advertise its poison and further reduce the risk of injury, the red-backed poison frog displays its brilliant warning colors, especially its red-orange back, for which it is named. Like all dendrobatids, it does not manufacture its poison itself, but rather is theorized to take the toxins from the ants, mites, and beetles on which it lives. It absorbs the insects' poisons into its body, which is immune to the poison. The poison is stored in skin glands just beneath the frog's epidermis. The poison seeps through open wounds and orifices, and, it is believed, through the pores. This defense is especially effective against mammalian and avian predators, and, to a lesser extent, reptilian ones. Amazonian ground snakes have a limited resistance to the poison, and occasionally will attack such frogs.

== Habitat ==
This frog lives in primary and secondary rainforests. This frog has been observed between 150 and 340 meters above sea level.

== Description ==
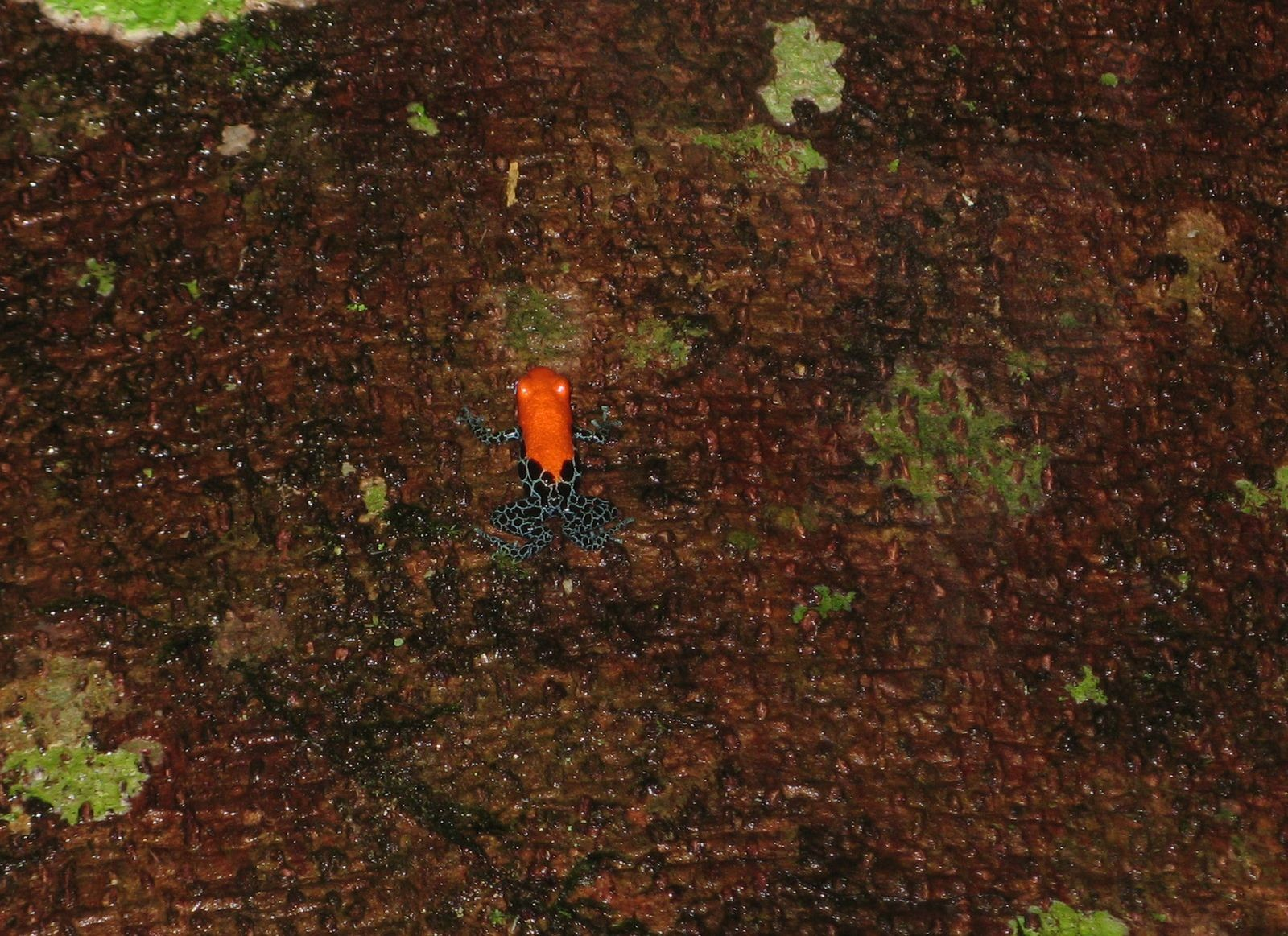
R. reticulata climbing a tree.

The adult male frog measures 13.0 to 15.0 mm in snout-vent length and the adult female frog about 14.0–17.0 mm. The dorsal surfaces of the head and body are metallic red or red-brown in color. Some frogs have black spots. The tops of the four legs, flanks, and belly are gray or blue-gray with black reticulation. As they are very small, they often attempt to advertise their poison by flaunting such colors or by ascending trees to escape from predators. If isolated from any form of escape, R. reticulata will use their poison as a defense mechanism. R. reticulata are more slimly built than many dendrobatids, which combined with their small size, gives them the ability to squeeze into minute hiding places.

== Reproduction ==
R. reticulata naturally live in groups of five or six. At the end of the wet season, several of these groups join in large breeding gatherings. As with other poison dart frogs, the males court the females by calling to capture their attention, and then by gently stroking and licking them. A female will signal that she is sufficiently impressed by stamping her hind feet. The two frogs will then mate. The fact that the breeding season begins at the end of the wet season ensures that the eggs will be laid at the beginning of the next wet season, ensuring that the young will have a steady supply of water to keep them alive. The female frog lays eggs on the ground.

Once the eggs hatch, the male carries the tadpoles into the canopy. The tadpoles have a water-soluble adhesive mucus that helps them stick to their father's back. The male R. reticulata will deposit the tadpoles into the tiny pools that accumulate in the centre of bromeliads. The female will then feed the tadpoles with infertile eggs that she lays into the water. Once the tadpoles become froglets, they are led by their parents to an existing group of red-backed poison frogs. While the young froglets are accepted by all members of the group, only their parents will look after the young frogs.

== As pets ==
R. reticulata is considered a species for advanced dart hobbyists only. Their small size, breeding difficulties, and generally difficult care relative to other darts shows through high mortality rates with novice keepers. These difficulties are also the reason that the frog is fairly uncommon in the dart frog hobby and command a price upwards of $125–150 U.S. dollars per frog. It is also recommended to only keep them in pairs unless the tank size is substantial (55 gallons or larger), as there are many witness accounts and anecdotal reports of heavy same-sex aggression in smaller enclosures.

== Threats ==
The IUCN classifies this frog as least concern of extinction because of its large range. What danger it faces comes from deforestation by humans. For example, people burn trees to make charcoal to sell as fuel. Scientists also cite the capture of live frogs for the international pet trade.

The frog's range includes at least one protected park: Reserva Nacional Allpahuayo Mishana.

== See also ==
- Splash-back poison frog
- Ranitomeya imitator
- Reticulated poison frog
