= Ranitomeya rubrocephala =

Scientific classification
- Kingdom: Animalia
- Phylum: Chordata
- Class: Amphibia
- Order: Anura
- Family: Dendrobatidae
- Genus: Ranitomeya
- Species: R. rubrocephala

Binomial name
- Ranitomeya rubrocephala (Schulte, 1999)

Synonyms
- Dendrobates rubrocephalus Schulte, 1999

Species of amphibian

Ranitomeya rubrocephala is a species of frog of doubtful taxonomic status in the family Dendrobatidae.

== Taxonomy and description ==
Taxonomic status of Ranitomeya rubrocephala is dubious, considered either nomen dubium or nomen inquirendum. The original species description was based on two specimens from an unspecific locality in the eastern slopes of the Andes in the Pasco Region, Peru, likely collected in 1956 by an unknown collector. Ranitomeya rubrocephala is a small (snout–vent length less than 15 mm (0.6 in)) frog that in preservative is entirely black, except for the reddish-orange head and throat patch. However, the specimens are in bad condition, making it very difficult to associate newly collected specimens with this species. Ranitomeya rubrocephala is perhaps conspecific with Ranitomeya benedicta.
