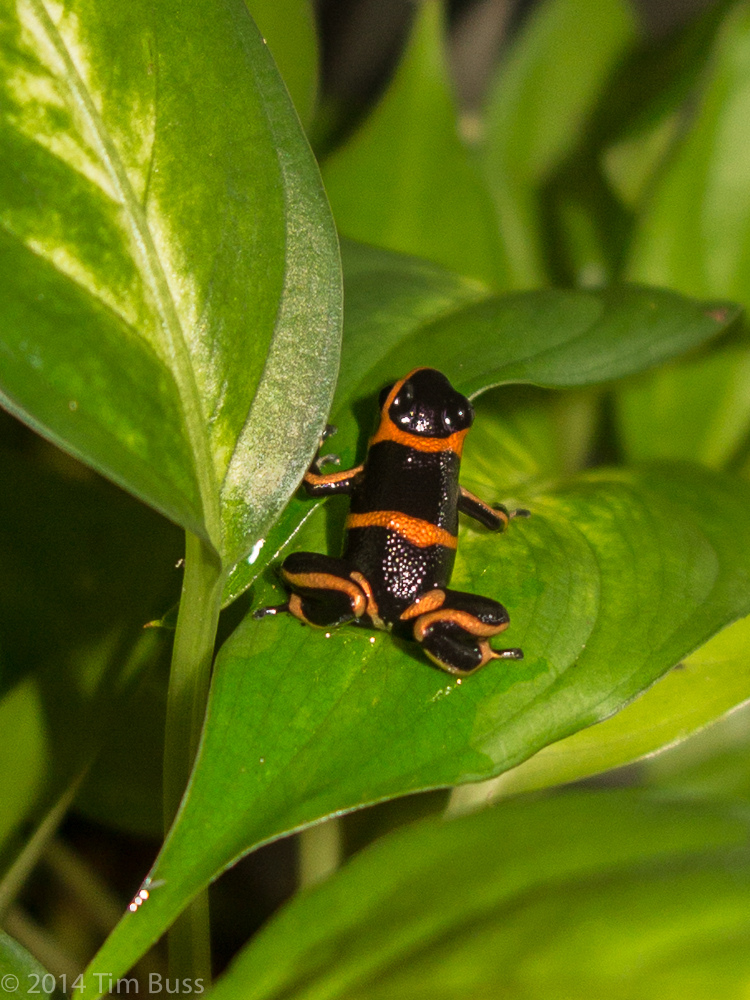

Conservation status
- Endangered (IUCN 3.1)

Scientific classification
- Kingdom: Animalia
- Phylum: Chordata
- Class: Amphibia
- Order: Anura
- Family: Dendrobatidae
- Genus: Ranitomeya
- Species: R. summersi

Binomial name
- Ranitomeya summersi Brown, Twomey, Pepper, and Sanchez-Rodriguez, 2008

Synonyms
- Dendrobates summersi (Brown, Twomey, Pepper, and Sanchez-Rodriguez, 2008)

= Ranitomeya summersi =

Species of amphibian

Ranitomeya summersi, sometimes referred to as Summers' poison frog, is a species of poison dart frogs found in the central Huallaga River drainage and adjacent Cordillera Azul National Park in central Peru. Before 2008, the species was considered a subspecies of Ranitomeya fantastica. The IUCN considers it an endangered species because of limited habitat range, habitat loss, and collection for the pet trade.

== Morphology ==
Ranitomeya summersi is one of the smallest species of poison dart frogs, commonly known as "thumbnail" darts. It has an orange and black banded pattern and a large snout to vent length. Males and females exhibit no sexual dimorphism in snout to vent length, exhibiting a range from 15.5 mm to 20.4 mm. This species possesses a black marking over the eyes extending past the tympanum giving them the appearance of a mask. The species is a Batesian mimicry of Ranitomeya Variabilis. While Ranitomeya imitator can copy the appearance of R. summersi, R. summersi can be distinguished from the imitator by its soft buzz call which can only be heard less than 1 m away, and its dark mask which covers the tympanum. In contrast the Ranitomeya imitator calls are much louder and can be heard from 5 m away.

== Habitat ==
This diurnal frog is primarily terrestrial. It inhabits dry primary and secondary submontane forest. It has been observed between 180 and 700 meters above sea level.

== Life cycle ==
The female frog lays eggs in leaf litter in clutches of 6–9. After the eggs hatch, the male frog carries them to pools of water inside holes in trees or in the axils of the plant Dieffenbachia.

== Threats ==
The IUCN classifies this frog as endangered because of the considerable and ongoing habitat loss associated with widespread deforestation in favor of both small-scale farming and agrobusiness. This frog is highly prized as a terrarium pet and can be captured for the international pet trade. Although there was some legal export circa 2001 and although it is possible to rear this animal in captivity, almost all the pet frogs currently held by humans are either illegal captures or the descendants of illegal captures.

The frog's range has not been found to include any protected parks, but it passes near Cordillera Escalera Regional Conservation Area and Cordillera Azul National Park. As of 2018, the frog has not been formally observed as present in these parks.
