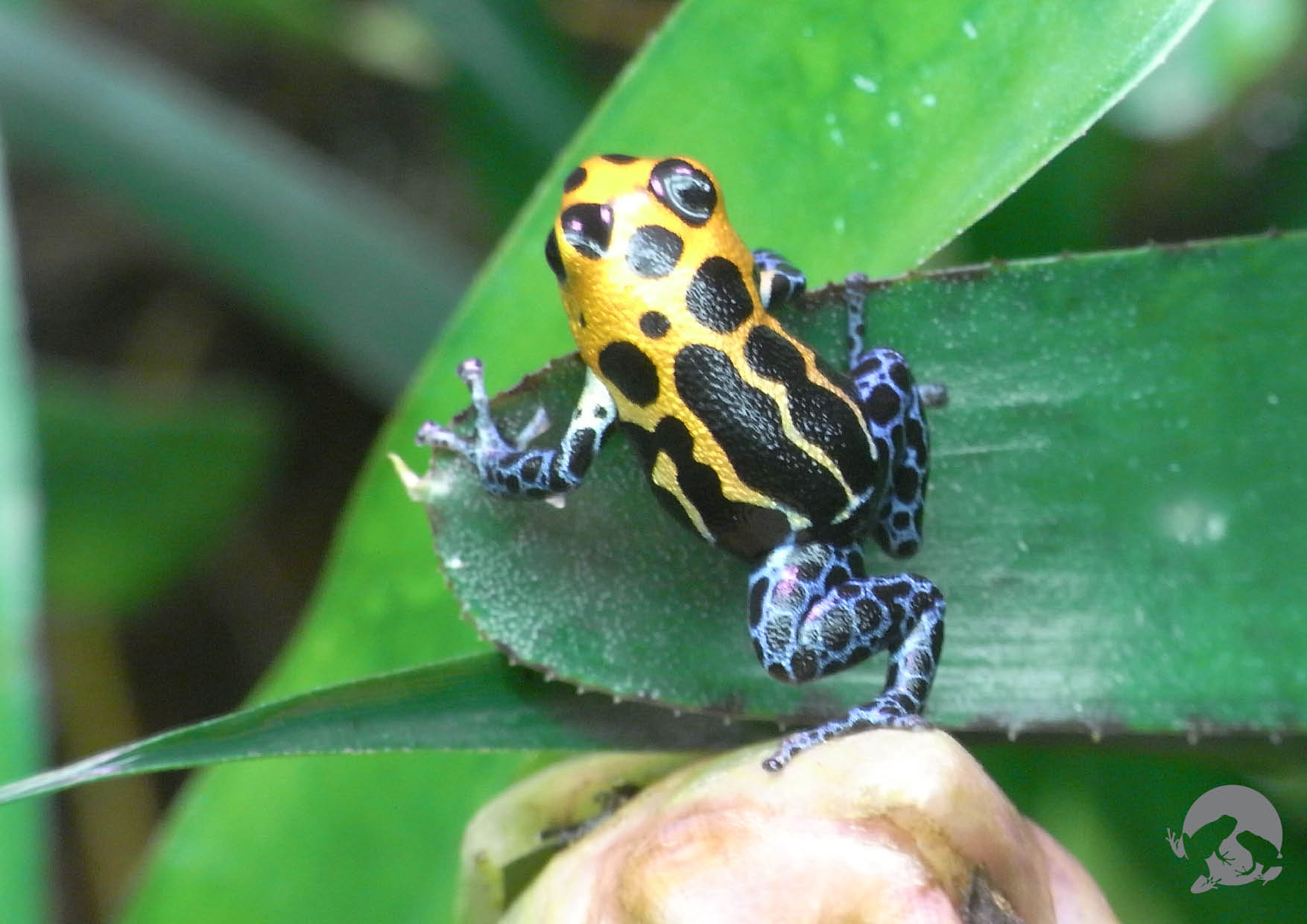
- R. imitator
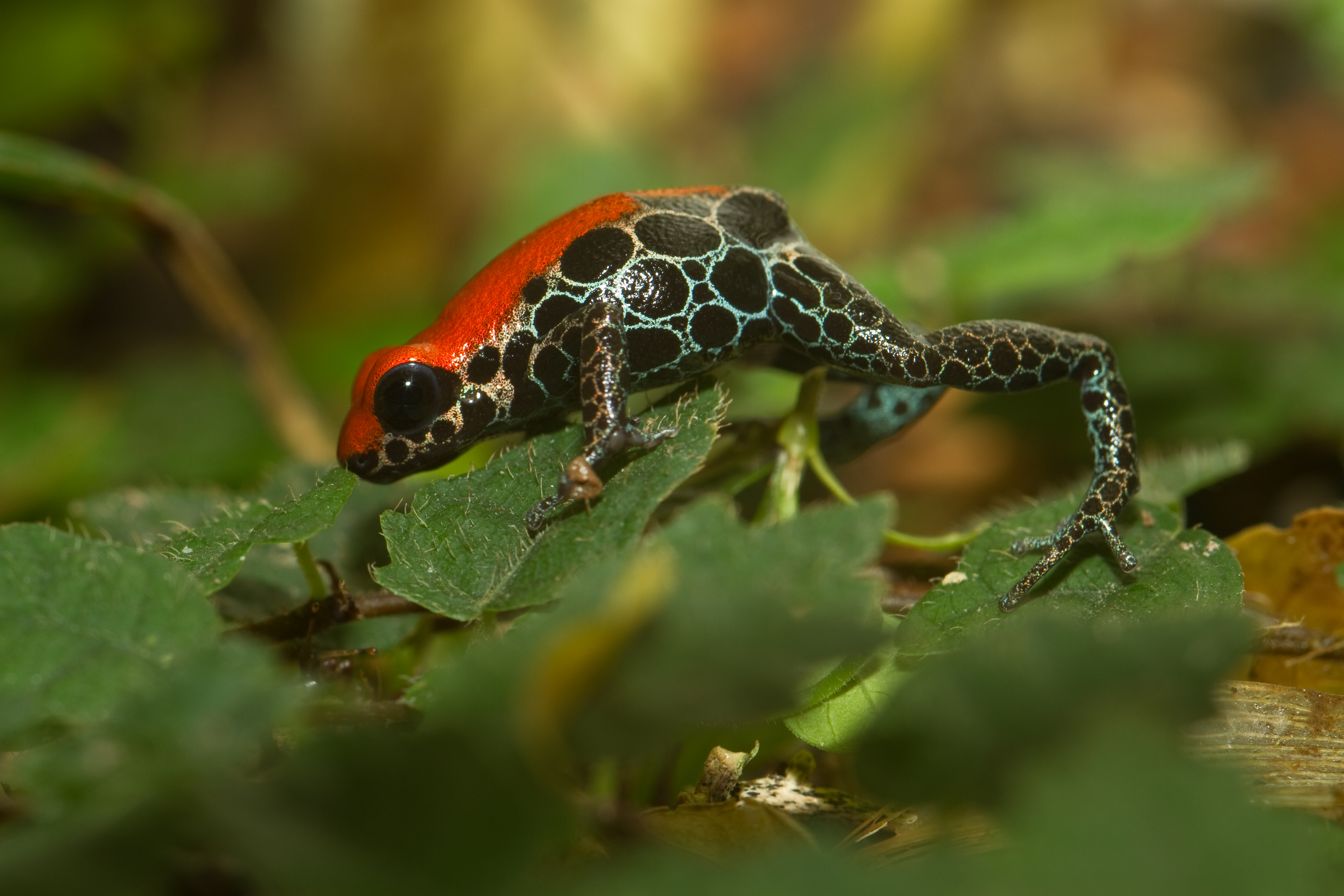
- R. reticulata

Scientific classification
- Kingdom: Animalia
- Phylum: Chordata
- Class: Amphibia
- Order: Anura
- Family: Dendrobatidae
- Subfamily: Dendrobatinae
- Genus: Ranitomeya; Bauer, 1986

Diversity
- 16 species (see text)

= Ranitomeya =

Genus of amphibians

Ranitomeya is a genus of dart poison frogs found in Panama and South America south to Peru and Brazil, possibly into Bolivia.

== Taxonomy ==
In 2006 Grant et al. revised the systematics of poison dart frogs and placed many species formerly classified in the genera Dendrobates, Minyobates and Phyllobates in Ranitomeya. In 2011 Brown and colleagues, following other scientists who assumed the existence of two distinct clades in Ranitomeya, erected the genus Andinobates for 12 species of Ranitomeya.

Ranitomeya and Andinobates frogs can be distinguished from those in genera such as Dendrobates in that they are generally smaller, have more than two colors, and seem to glitter if viewed from certain angles. Ranitomeya is widespread in the Amazon basin, whereas Andinobates species are found only in the northern Andes down to Central America.

== Description ==
Adults measure no more than 21 mm (0.83 in) in snout–vent length and are typically brightly colored, often with bright yellow, red, or green dorsum that can be uniform in color or with stripes or dots. Also the throat has distinctive color, usually yellow, orange or red. Dorsal skin is smooth or weakly granular. The head is narrower than the body. Fingers and toes bear discs, with those on the fingers being large. Some species in the genus, such as R. variabilis, exhibit tadpole transport and cannibalistic behavior.

== Threats ==
Many Ranitomeya species are threatened by habitat loss and collection for the pet trade.

== Species ==
There are currently 18 accepted species in the genus Ranitomeya:

Image	Scientific name	Distribution
	Ranitomeya aetherea Koch, Mônico, Dayrell, Ferreira, Dantas, Moravec, and Lima, 2025	Juruá River basin, western Brazil
	Ranitomeya amazonica (Schulte, 1999)	northeastern Amazonian Peru (Loreto Region, including the type locality) and extreme southeastern Colombia (Amazonas Department), and expected in the adjacent Brazil, Venezuela; extreme southern Guyana; eastern French Guiana; the mouth of the Amazon in Brazil
	Ranitomeya aquamarina Mônico, Koch, Dayrell, Moravec and Lima, 2025	Juruá River basin, western Brazil
	Ranitomeya benedicta Brown, Twomey, Pepper, and Sanchez-Rodriguez, 2008	
	Ranitomeya cyanovittata Pérez-Peña, Chávez, Twomey, and Brown, 2010	Pampas del Sacramento in southern Loreto and eastern San Martín Region, northeastern Peru
	Ranitomeya defleri Twomey and Brown, 2009	southeastern Colombia
	Ranitomeya fantastica (Boulenger, 1884)	eastern Sierra del Divisor, Loreto, Peru
	Ranitomeya flavovittata (Schulte, 1999)	northern San Martín and Loreto Regions, Peru
	Ranitomeya imitator (Schulte, 1986)	Loreto Region, Peru
	Ranitomeya reticulata (Boulenger, 1884)	eastern Peru.
	Ranitomeya sirensis (Aichinger, 1991)	Amazon rainforest in Peru and Ecuador.
	Ranitomeya summersi Brown, Twomey, Pepper, and Sanchez-Rodriguez, 2008	central Huallaga River drainage and adjacent Cordillera Azul National Park in central Peru
	Ranitomeya toraro Brown, Caldwell, Twomey, Melo-Sampaio, and Souza, 2011	western Brazil in the states of Acre and Amazonas, and in the north of Rondônia state
	Ranitomeya uakarii (Brown, Schulte, and Summers, 2006)	southern Peru (Madre de Dios), central Peru (Pachitea drainage), western Brazil (near Porto Walter), along the upper Amazon (in Peru and Colombia), and as far west as central Guyana.
	Ranitomeya vanzolinii (Myers, 1982)	Amazonian rainforests of Brazil and Peru
	Ranitomeya variabilis (Zimmermann and Zimmermann, 1988)	Huallaga River drainage of San Martín Region, Peru
	Ranitomeya ventrimaculata (Shreve, 1935)	Brazil, southeastern Colombia, Ecuador, French Guiana, and Peru.
	Ranitomeya yavaricola Pérez-Peña, Chávez, Twomey, and Brown, 2010	Rio Yavari-Mirin, Loreto, Peru

Dendrobates rubrocephalus Schulte, 1999 is placed here incertae sedis.

In 2025, a team of researchers published the description of two new Ranitomeya species, R. aquamarina and R. aetherea, representing the first species named in the genus in more than ten years. The publications describing these species were accompanied by a molecular phylogenetic analysis including all members of the genus named to that point. These results are displayed in the cladogram below, with species groups noted.

- Ranitomeya
  - - - Ranitomeya defleri species group
        Ranitomeya defleri
      - Ranitomeya toraro species group
        - Ranitomeya toraro
        - Ranitomeya aff. toraro
    - - Ranitomeya variabilis species group
        - Ranitomeya aff. variabilis
        - - Ranitomeya variabilis
          - - Ranitomeya aff. ventrimaculata 1
            - - Ranitomeya aff. ventrimaculata 2
              - Ranitomeya amazonica
      - Ranitomeya reticulata species group
        - - Ranitomeya aff. fantastica
          - - Ranitomeya fantastica
            - - Ranitomeya benedicta
              - Ranitomeya summersi
        - - Ranitomeya uakarii
          - - Ranitomeya ventrimaculata
            - Ranitomeya reticulata
  - Ranitomeya vanzolinii species group
    - - Ranitomeya sirensis
      - Ranitomeya aff. sirensis
    - - - Ranitomeya imitator
        - - Ranitomeya aquamarina
          - - Ranitomeya flavovittata (sensu stricto)
            - - Ranitomeya flavovittata
              - Ranitomeya vanzolinii
      - - Ranitomeya yavaricola
        - - Ranitomeya cyanovittata
          - Ranitomeya aetherea
