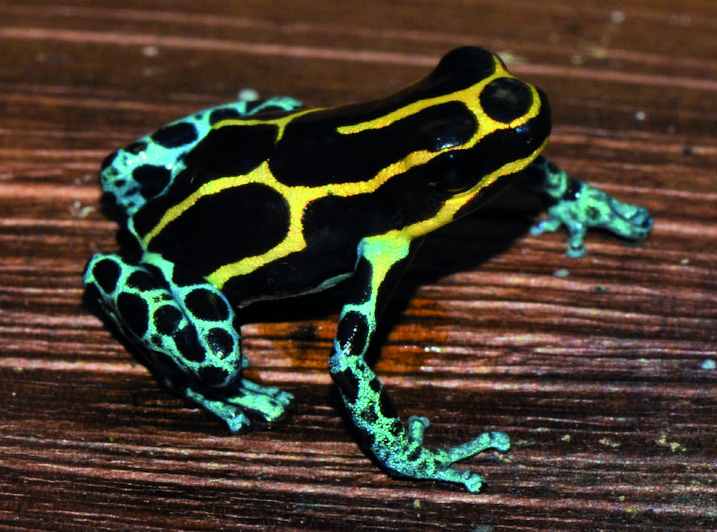
- Amapá, Brazil

Conservation status
- Data Deficient (IUCN 3.1)

Scientific classification
- Kingdom: Animalia
- Phylum: Chordata
- Class: Amphibia
- Order: Anura
- Family: Dendrobatidae
- Genus: Ranitomeya
- Species: R. variabilis

Binomial name
- Ranitomeya variabilis (Zimmermann and Zimmermann, 1988)

Synonyms
- Dendrobates variabilis Zimmermann and Zimmermann, 1988

= Zimmerman's poison frog =

Species of amphibian

Ranitomeya variabilis, formerly known as Dendrodates variabilis, is a species of small poison dart frog distributed in northern Peru, along the eastern slope of Andes in the upper Rio Huallaga drainage basin. Its common name, Zimmerman's poison frog, is named after Elke Zimmermann, a German zoologist who described the morph of this species and differentiated it from D. ventrimaculatus. The species was formerly considered to be synonymous with Ranitomeya ventrimaculata.

Ranitomeya variabilis usually has a bright yellow body with deep blue limbs, and black spots or stripes across the ventral side of the body. The colors change in some geographic locations. R. variabilis has different mimicry relationships with two other species. Like other frogs in the same family, R. variabilis has toxic skin alkaloid which repels potential predators.

R. variabilis are cannibalistic even as tadpoles, so adult male parents may allow tadpoles to jump on their backs and transport them to less crowded areas. Adult R. variabilis use chemical cues to determine the presence of tadpoles and whether they are cannibalistic or not.

== Description ==
=== Adults ===
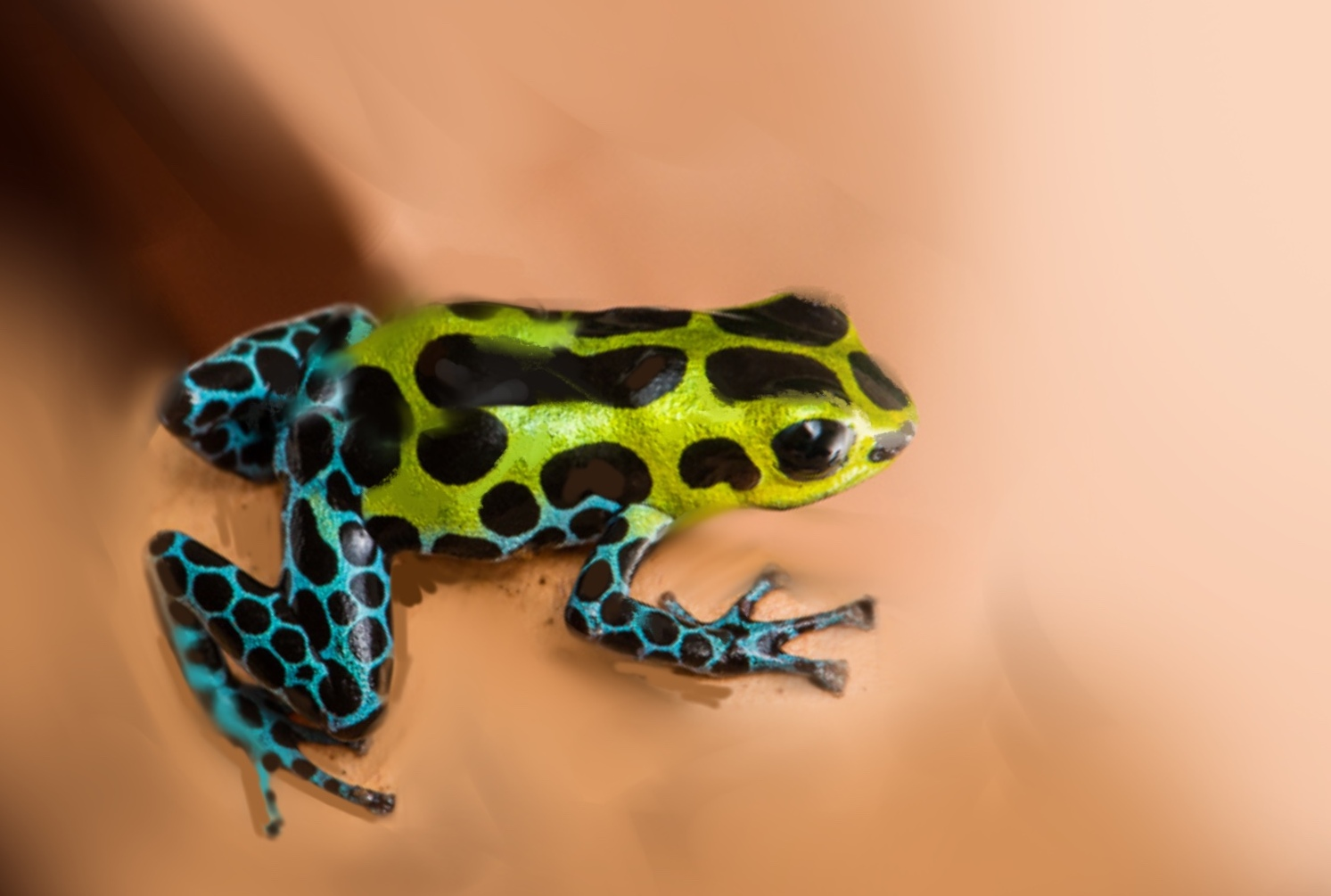
Illustration

R. variabilis are characterized by a black spot on the tip of the snout and the black Y-shaped pattern on their back. The species' body color ranges from yellow to green and the body color terminates where the arms insert. Limbs are usually blue with black spotted pattern, throats are usually bright yellow, and the ventral side of their bodies are usually light blue. However, because Ranitomeya variabilis is a polymorphic species with high genetic diversity, its pattern and color may change depending on the geographical location. Adult R. variabilis contain two morphs: stripped and spotted morphs. The stripped morphs are commonly found in lowland regions whereas the spotted morphs are distributed among highland regions. Females are also significantly larger than males in R. variabilis.

=== Tadpoles ===
Tadpoles have dark and slightly brownish bodies with incomplete wide dorsal gaps and emarginated oral discs. The black-brown color changes to a black-green pattern during metamorphosis. In preservative, the grey dorsal body color appears to be dark brown with darker spots. The lateral tail is still light brown. The posterior part of the tadpole body appears to be slightly opaque, and the intestine can be seen. The ventral fin is transparent with brown spots.

== Taxonomy ==
R. variabilis belongs to the genus Ranitomeya, a monophyletic evolutionary group. It is most closely related to the species R. amazonica. The genus Ranitomeya is divided into four separate species groups, and R. variabilis along with R. amazonica belong to the variabilis group.

== Habitat and distribution ==
R. variabilis is native to South America. It is mainly distributed in the western region of the Amazonian-Orinocan Lowlands, which is around northern Peru, Ecuador, western Brazil, and the southern Colombia region. R. variabilis can be found as far as 195 kilometers southeast of Brazil.

The average rainfall in areas in which R. variabilis habituate is around 2500 mm, with a dry season between June and September. This dry season is correlated with changes in parental and egg deposition behaviors. Temperature varies from 16 to 32 °C and tends to be on the lower end during the dry season. Adults are often found in secondary to ancient forests because of the presence of ideal oviposition sites. Individuals have also been found around higher arboreal perches.

=== Conservation ===
R. variabilis populations are threatened by habitat loss and fragmentation due to agricultural development and logging. R. variabilis is involved in illegal pet trafficking for poison dart frogs.

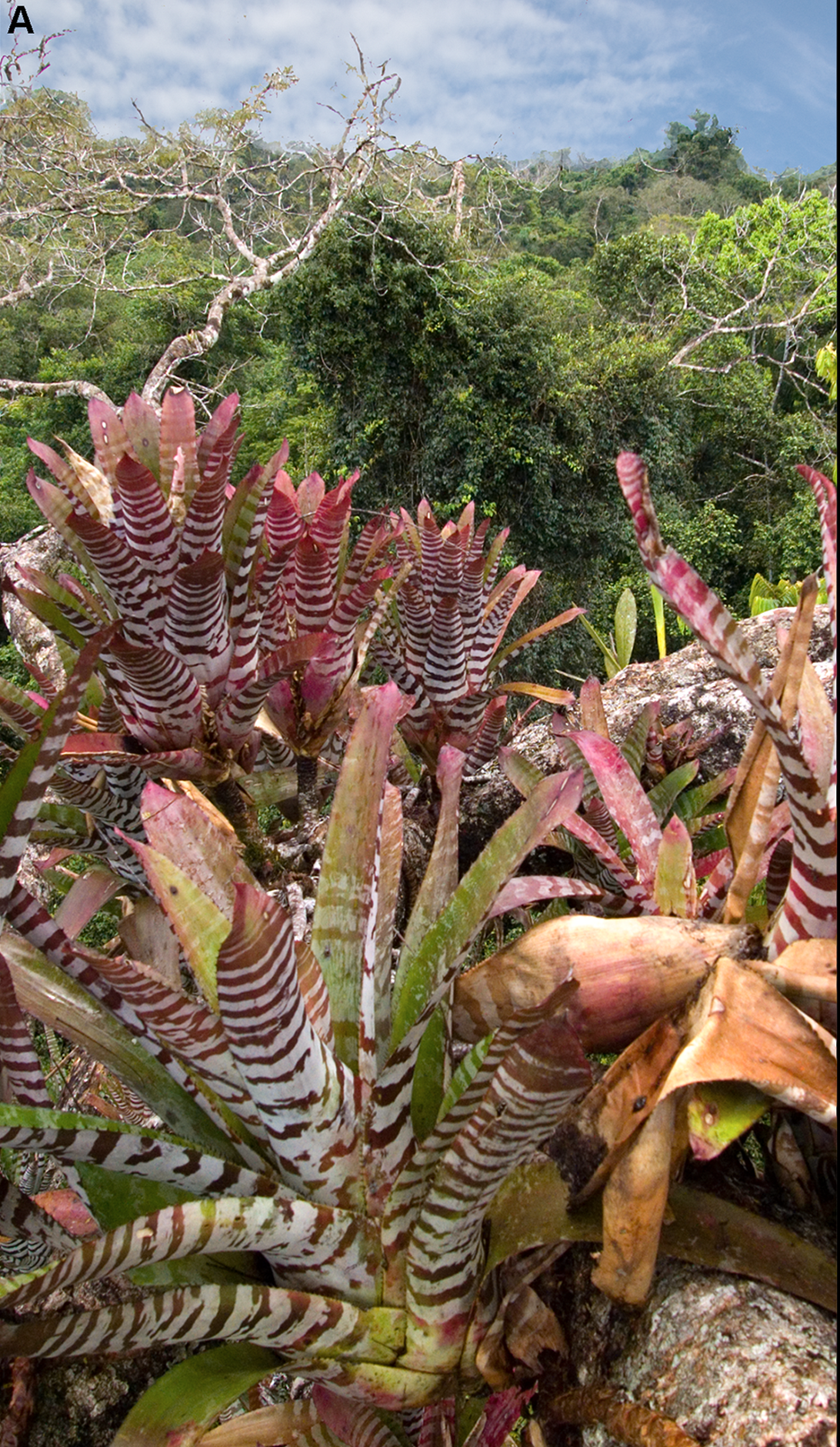
Arboreal habitat of Ranitomeya variabilis with epiphytic bromeliad Aechmea zebrina.

== Home range and territoriality ==
Home range is the general region in which an individual travels for food acquisition; adult R. variabilis occupy home ranges averaging around 31.3 square meters. Because the species exhibits male uniparental care, home ranges are less strongly associated with phytotelmata availability and territoriality is minimal when compared with the biparental R. imitator, and male individuals are often observed far away from their reproductive sites. Due to their promiscuous mating system, there is also less home range overlap between individual breeding pairs.

== Diet ==
R. variabilis tadpoles are known to be omnivorous and cannibalistic. In addition to eggs and conspecific tadpoles in the same phytotelma, R. variabilis tadpoles are also able to feed on organic detritus, small insect larvae, and other anuran eggs.

Adult R. variabilis generally prey on ants, fruit flies, termites, and small beetles.

== Reproduction ==
Reproduction occurs during the day and peaks after rain. Males initiate advertisement calls when they see a female and approach the female with increasing calling frequency. Males usually call around suitable phytotelma, and once the female lay the eggs, the male fertilize them. Female R. variabilis usually lay around 2-6 eggs in water. The species also has a promiscuous mating system, meaning males and females mated randomly and polygynously. R. variabilis exhibit little to no mate fidelity.

Male R. variabilis call from arboreal perches in the presence of females. The calling frequency increases as the male approach the female. Calling only occurs when males attempt to attract females. R. variabilis makes a buzzing call ranging from 106 – 297 pulses per second, each pulse ranging from 0.14 to 0.44 seconds and intervals ranging from 0.6 to 2.0 seconds. These short, high-frequency (4386 – 5624 Hz) calls are common among other frogs within the variabilis group.

Two males wrestle to determine dominance when they come into conflict over a female. The winner has the opportunity to fertilize the eggs first. The subordinate male has the chance to fertilize the egg after the dominant male while the dominant male continues to court the female, even after the initial fertilization. This fertilization process can repeat in multiple cycles.

=== Oviposition ===
R. variabilis breed in phytotelmata, small pools of water captured by plant cavities. Using phytotelmata may reduce the risk of predation because of the scattered location of water. However, this limits the space for tadpole development and increases intraspecies competition, leading to cannibalism among tadpoles. R. variabilis are found to use multiple species of plants for tadpole deposition, primarily Bromeliads of the genus Aechmea, but occasionally using others, such as in Dieffenbachia and Heliconia. The average pool size of these phytotelmata is around 112 milliliters.

Researchers have found that adult R. variabilis avoid laying eggs in phytotelmata with non-familiar tadpoles but would not avoid phytotelmata with tadpoles that they have placed there themselves. One explanation for this phenomenon is that occasionally adults would attempt to feed tadpoles with eggs. A piece of evidence for this is observations of egg deposition with tadpoles during the dry season, when tadpoles are developing. Unlike their close relatives R. imitator and R. vanzolinii, R. variabilis lay their eggs just below water level to keep the eggs moisturized, have access to oxygen, and possibly as food if placed with tadpoles.

In R. variabilis, oviposition is not closely related to the home range.

== Parental care ==
R. variabilis exhibits uniparental male care. Females do not return to phytotelmata for egg feeding. Although R. variabilis are unable to recognize kinship or their own offspring, they often return to the same phytotelma to lay their larvae. There is also evidence for adults revisiting and sleeping in the phytotelmata within the home range. Because tadpoles are cannibalistic, the male parent oftentimes separates the siblings by transporting them into other phytotelmata, which increases individual offspring's fitness. This tadpole transportation action often occurs 10–15 days after oviposition. Males can usually transport 1 to 6 tadpoles. When a male frog approaches the water body, tadpoles would almost "jump" on the back of the adult, mimicking an attack movement, while adults would not assist this mounting movement. One study showed that R. variabilis tadpoles demonstrate attraction to adult frogs that stop by the phytotelma, with no species discrimination, and no attraction to 3-D printed frog models.

== Chemical cues ==
Adult R. variabilis can distinguish the presence of tadpoles through chemical cues and whether a tadpole is cannibalistic or not. Research published in 2011 demonstrated that when parents of R. variabilis are choosing between clean water and water previously treated with cannibalistic tadpoles, the parents avoided the treated water despite the absence of visual cues. Additionally, when parents have to choose between clean water and water in which cannibalistic tadpoles are present, parents again strongly avoided water containing cannibalistic tadpoles. On the other hand, when parents have to choose between clean water and water in which non-cannibalistic tadpoles are present, there is no significance between parent preferences.

Male R. variabilis can distinguish chemical cues of different species. Adults would avoid egg deposition when chemical cues were produced by the species in the same family, Dendrobatidae. The specific chemical molecule has not been identified, but it can be inferred that the evolution of producing this specific chemical compound is only present in closely related species. On the other hand, R. variabilis demonstrate a preference for Osteocephalus larvae in phytotelmata. This is due to R. variabilis's ability to recognize specific non-cannibalistic species tadpoles such as O. mimeticus and O. lenoniae. This could be an evolutionary trait, as non-cannibalistic species can serve as a convenient food source for hatching R. variabilis tadpoles.

Though chemical cues seem to be the main method for identifying the presence of tadpoles in phytotelma since eggs and tadpoles are usually hidden in the bottom, the mechanism of how the chemicals are released still remains unclear.

== Mimicry ==
R. variabilis is a Batesian mimic of R. summersi, and R. imitator is a Müllerian mimic of R. variabilis. However, the R. imitator has an extra nose spot which differs from the single spot from R. variabilis. These two species are known to inhabit overlapping regions. Avian predators are the major predators for most dendrobatid frogs in the family and are the primary force to drive evolution of dendrobatid frog pattern including Müllerian mimicry.

== Cannibalism ==
R. variabilis tadpoles are known to have cannibalistic behaviors including eating eggs and waiting for the egg to hatch to consume the tadpoles. Some adults will even transport tadpoles to phytotelma that already contain eggs to have their offspring feed on the clutch. Observations have been made of tadpoles eating only the embryo and not the egg capsules.
