= Ranitomeya toraro =

Conservation status
- Least Concern (IUCN 3.1)

Scientific classification
- Kingdom: Animalia
- Phylum: Chordata
- Class: Amphibia
- Order: Anura
- Family: Dendrobatidae
- Genus: Ranitomeya
- Species: R. toraro

Binomial name
- Ranitomeya toraro Brown, Caldwell, Twomey, Melo-Sampaio, and Souza, 2011

Species of frog

Ranitomeya toraro, the Apuriná poison frog, is a species of frog in the family Dendrobatidae. It is endemic to Colombia and Brazil and possibly nearby Peru.

== Taxonomy ==
Scientists used to classify this frog as conspecific with Adelphobates quinquevittaus and Ranitomeya ventrimaculata under the names Dendrobates quiquevittatus and Dendrobates ventrimaculatus but reevaluated the classifications in 2011.

== Description ==
The adult frog measures 15–17 mm in snout-vent length. The toes of all four feet have climbing disks. The skin of the frog's head and back is black. It has stripes, like other frogs in Ranitomeya, but they are thinner and narrower. This frog has stripes from its eyelids to its vent and one in the middle from the snout to the vent. There is a yellow spot on the snout. There is a ventrolateral stripe that is green-blue in color near the front legs and yellow near the groin. The chin is yellow in color with black spots. The belly and legs are black with light blue patterns that form ovals.

== Habitat ==
This frog lives in undisturbed primary and secondary forest in Amazonia. The frogs have been found on leaf litter, on logs, and on branches as high as 35 cm higher than the ground.

== Life cycle ==
Scientists have observed two clutches of eggs, one above a pool of water in a bromeliad plant, and one single egg above a pool of water in a bananeira-brava plant. They have also observed tadpoles swimming in the pools in P. guayanese and Heliconia plants, one tadpole per pool. Scientists think the tadpoles might engage in conspecific cannibalism. They have also seen adult male frogs carrying tadpoles on their backs. Other frogs in Ranitomeya carry their tadpoles to transport them from one pool of water to another.

== Threats ==
The IUCN classifies this frog as least concern of extinction because of its large range and population. Scientists believe it might be at some risk of capture for the international pet trade, but no one has been caught selling it yet as of 2023.
