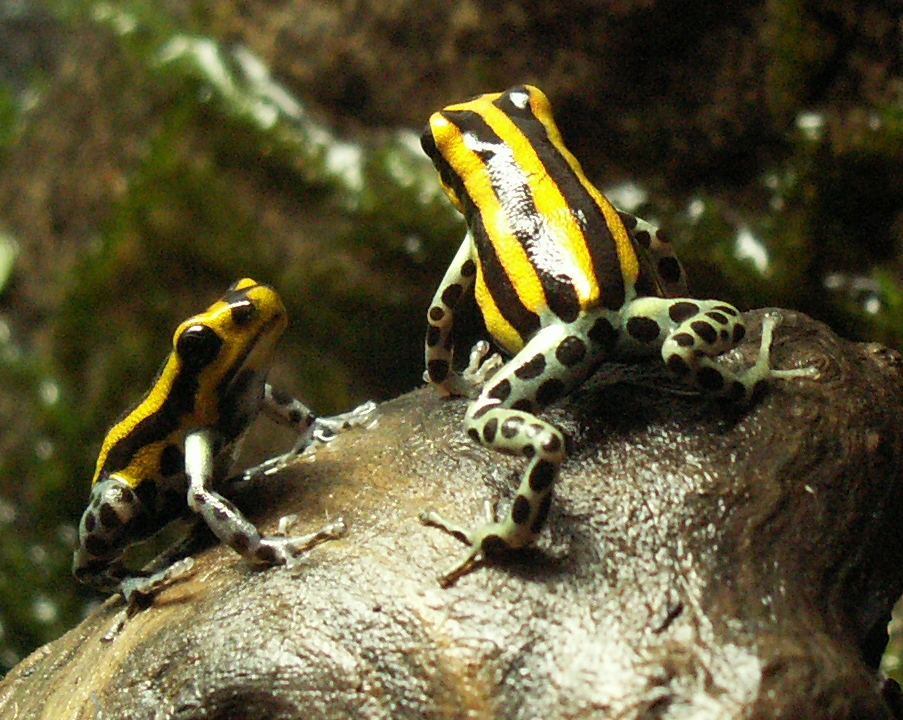

Conservation status
- Least Concern (IUCN 3.1)

Scientific classification
- Kingdom: Animalia
- Phylum: Chordata
- Class: Amphibia
- Order: Anura
- Family: Dendrobatidae
- Genus: Ranitomeya
- Species: R. sirensis

Binomial name
- Ranitomeya sirensis (Aichinger, 1991)

Synonyms
- Dendrobates sirensis Aichinger, 1991; Ranitomeya biolat (Morales, 1992); Ranitomeya lamasi (Morales, 1992)

= Sira poison dart frog =

Species of amphibian

Ranitomeya sirensis or the Sira poison frog is a species of poison dart frog found in the Amazonian rainforests of northern Bolivia (Pando Department), westernmost Brazil (Acre), and eastern Peru.

== Etymology ==
Scientists gave this frog the Latin name sirensis because of the place where it was first formally observed: Serranía de Sira.

== Description ==
The adult male frog measures 15–17 mm long in snout-vent length. This species has a number of distinct color morphs. The frogs that live in the Sira mountains have red skin on their backs with turquoise-green coloration on their limbs. Their bellies are blue-green with one red patch each. Frogs in other parts of the species' range are black with yellow stripes. All of these frogs have disks on their toes for climbing.

== Poison ==
Like most Ranitomeya species, R. sirensis is a mildly toxic poison dart frog. Its skin secretes small amounts of pumiliotoxins which coat the frog and cause pain and mild muscle spasms if the frog is handled carelessly. The symptoms may be more severe if the frog is ingested, but unlike the Phyllobates and Oophaga species, R. sirensis secretes the comparatively mild pumiliotoxin C in very small quantities due to its tiny size. As a result, sirensis mostly rely on their agility, speed, and ability to take shelter in the leaf litter or in dense foliage for protection.

R. sirensis, as with all dendrobatid frogs, loses its poison in captivity. The reason for the loss of its toxicity is thought to be the removal of a toxic insect or other invertebrate from the diet. Scientists have determined that members of the genus Phyllobates derive their dangerously potent toxins from local melyrid beetles. As R. sirensis is much less toxic than the Phyllobates species, the source of its toxin is not thought to be melyrid beetles; instead, it is likely an invertebrate that remains undiscovered.

== Habitat ==
This diurnal frog lives in secondary rainforests, where it has been observed between 200 and 1560 meters above sea level. This frog has also been found on some plantations that grow less intensive crops, such as coffee, but it does not live on farms with densely planted monocultures.

== Life cycle ==
Only the male frog takes care of the young. After the eggs hatch, the male frog carries the tadpoles to different pools of water inside bamboo plants or other plants. The tadpoles eat what they find there, such as mosquito larva.

== Conservation ==
The IUCN classifies this frog as least concern of extinction because of its large range. What threat it faces comes from capture for the international pet trade, which can render the species or some of its colormorphs locally endangered. Scientists recommend area-specific measures against their capture for this reason. This frog also faces some threat from habitat loss associated with deforestation in favor of agriculture.

The frog's range includes protected parks such as Yanachaga Chemillén National Park, Reserva Comunal El Sira, Manu National Park, Bahuaja-Sonene National Park and Tambopata National Reserve.
