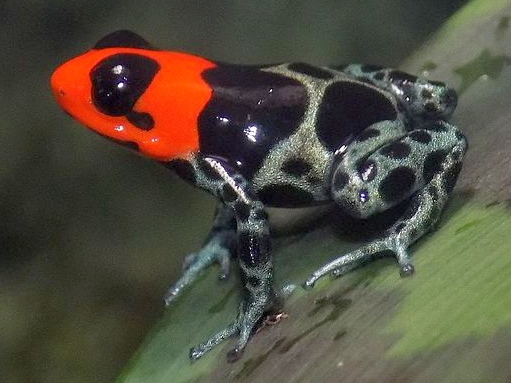

Conservation status
- Vulnerable (IUCN 3.1)

Scientific classification
- Kingdom: Animalia
- Phylum: Chordata
- Class: Amphibia
- Order: Anura
- Family: Dendrobatidae
- Genus: Ranitomeya
- Species: R. benedicta

Binomial name
- Ranitomeya benedicta Brown, Twomey, Pepper, and Sanchez-Rodriguez, 2008

Synonyms
- Dendrobates benedicta (Brown, Twomey, Pepper, and Sanchez-Rodriguez, 2008)

= Ranitomeya benedicta =

Species of amphibian

Ranitomeya benedicta, sometimes called the blessed poison frog, is a species of poison dart frogs found in the lowland rainforest of the Pampas del Sacramento in southern Loreto and eastern San Martín Region, northeastern Peru. Before 2008, the species was considered a subspecies of Ranitomeya fantastica. The IUCN considers the species vulnerable because of limited habitat range, habitat loss, and collection for the pet trade.

== Morphology ==
Ranitomeya benedicta is one of the larger species of thumbnail poison dart frogs. It has a red head and a large snout to vent length which helps distinguish it from other Ranitomeya such as the smaller red-backed poison frog. Males can reach approximately 16.5 mm in length from snout to vent, while the larger females can reach approximately 18.4 mm with some reaching 20.2 mm. Besides their red head they also possess black markings over their eyes which resembles a W-shaped mask and have black colored limbs, dorsum, and venter with a blue reticulated pattern. In some populations, however, the reticulated pattern might not appear, instead showing some of the limbs or parts of the dorsum only being uniformly blue. While Ranitomeya fantastica might resemble this species, this species contains a head that's clearly red while R. fantastica head contains colors that are closer to a bright orange coloration.

== Habitat ==
This frog inhabits lowland primary rainforest and older secondary rainforest. It has been observed between 150 and 405 meters (490 and 1,300 ft) above sea level. It has been seen in tangled branches and in dead trees on the ground. This frog is diurnal and partially terrestrial, though small-scale farmers and loggers have seen the frog jumping away when the trees are felled.

== Life cycle ==
The male frog's voice sounds like a buzz. Scientists have never heard the frog call in the wild, but frogs in terrariums call at all times of day.

The female frog lays 4–6 eggs per clutch. After the eggs hatch, the adult frog carries the tadpoles to different pools of water in bromeliad plants.

== Threats ==
The IUCN classifies this frog as vulnerable to extinction because of habitat loss. Much of its range is uninhabited and not subject to deforestation, but parts of it are, especially in favor of agriculture and logging. People also began to capture this frog for the international pet trade shortly after the original description was published, in some cases cutting down trees to search the bromeliads for frogs to sell. It is also reared legally in captivity.

The frog's range includes at least one protected park: Cordillera Azul National Park.
