= Venter =

Venter or Venters is an Afrikaans (and rarely, Jewish) surname, and may refer to:

== Venter ==
- AJ Venter (b. 1973), South African rugby union footballer
- Al J Venter (b. 1938), author
- André Venter (b. 1970), South African rugby union footballer
- Ben Venter (b. 1987), South African rugby union footballer
- Bill Venter (b. 1934), South African businessman
- Brendan Venter (b. 1969), South African rugby union footballer
- Christoffel Venter (1892–1977), South African military commander
- Craig Venter (1946–2026), American biologist and businessman
- Danny Venter (b. 1987), South African association football player
- F.A. Venter (1916–1997), Afrikaans writer
- Floris Venter (1886–unknown), South African cyclist
- Francois Venter (b. 1991), South African rugby union footballer
- Hanco Venter (b. 1993), South African rugby union footballer
- Henco Venter (b. 1992), South African rugby union footballer
- Jacobus Johannes Venter (1814–1889), South African Boer political figure
- Jan Venter (b. 1988), South African swimmer
- Kyle Venter (b. 1991), American soccer player
- Mariella Venter (b. 2000), South African swimmer
- Orla Venter (b. 1976), Namibian long jumper
- Rina Venter (b. 1938), South African Minister of Health from 1989 to 1994
- Ruan Venter (b. 1992), South African rugby union footballer
- Ruan Venter (b. 2002), South African international rugby union footballer
- Shaun Venter (b. 1987), South African rugby union footballer
- Walter Venter (b. 1984), South African rugby union footballer

== Venters ==
- Alex Venters (1913–1959), Scottish footballer
- Jock Venters (1910–1978), Scottish footballer
- Jonny Venters (b. 1985), American baseball player

== Places ==
- Venter, the Hungarian name for Vintere village, Holod Commune, Bihor County, Romania
- Venter, Virginia, United States
- Ventersdorp, North West Province, South Africa

== Origin ==
The commonly accepted origin of the surname finds its roots in the Netherlands, however due to poor record-keeping there are doubts whether or not this is true. During the Church Reformation, the persecuted were known to board ships bound for far-off lands (South Africa being one with its recent establishment as a trading post for the Dutch East India Company (VOC) and their representative Jan van Riebeeck in 1652. During these escapes names were often changed, thus muddying the water.

One disputing theory is that Venter does not derive from the Dutch "Van Deventer", but rather from the French "Fender" as Huguenots sought refuge in the new settlement in the mid- to late 17th century.

There are still many missing links in the genealogy of the Venter family.

== See also ==
- Abdomen – the term venter may refer to the ventral side of an animal or plant organ
