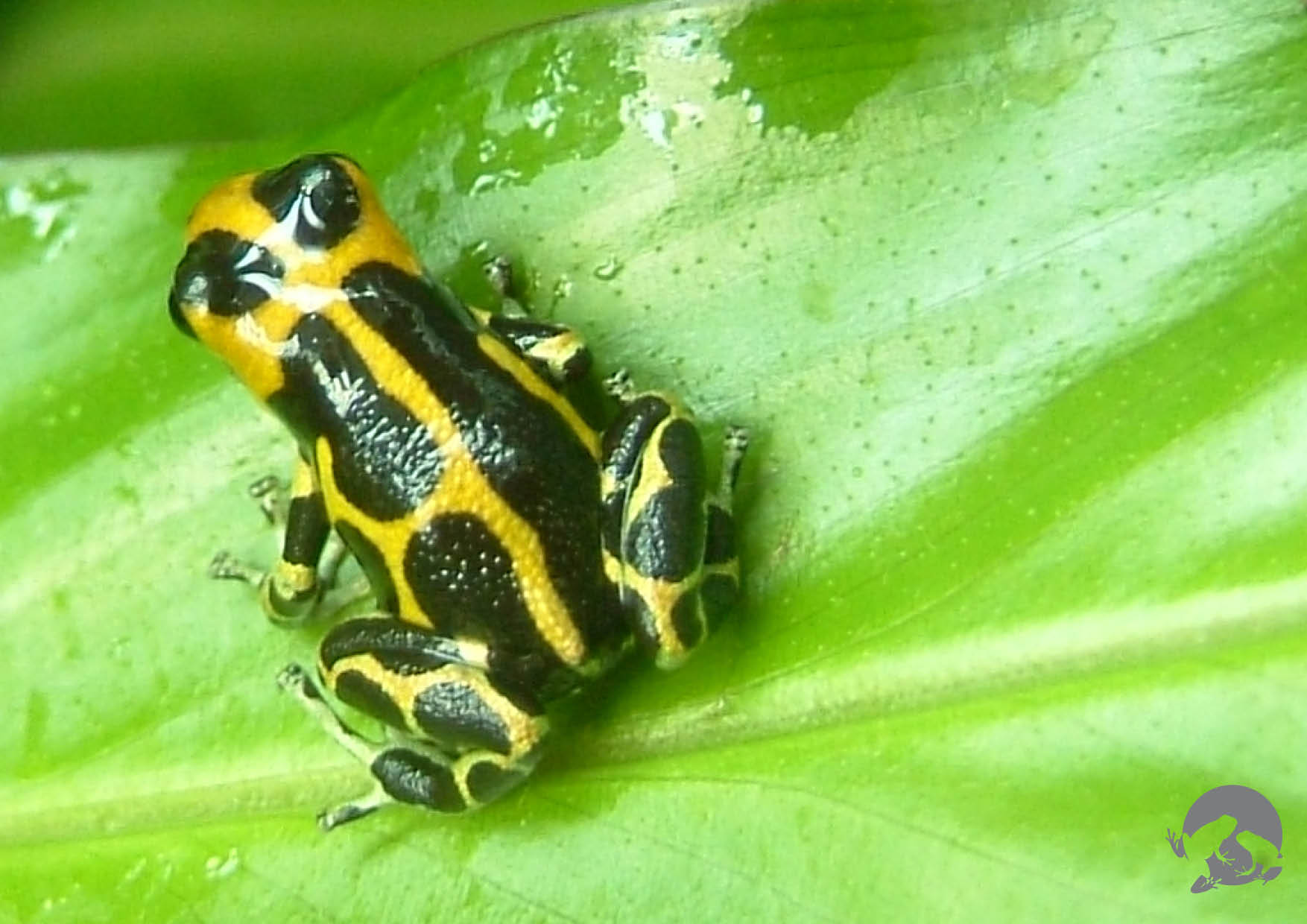

Conservation status
- Least Concern (IUCN 3.1)

Scientific classification
- Kingdom: Animalia
- Phylum: Chordata
- Class: Amphibia
- Order: Anura
- Family: Dendrobatidae
- Genus: Ranitomeya
- Species: R. imitator

Binomial name
- Ranitomeya imitator (Schulte, 1986)

Synonyms
- Dendrobates imitator Schulte, 1986

= Mimic poison frog =

Species of amphibian

Ranitomeya imitator (formerly Dendrobates imitator), is a species of poison dart frog found in the north-central region of eastern Peru. Its common names include mimic poison frog and poison arrow frog, and it is one of the best known dart frogs. It was discovered in the late 1980s by Rainer Schulte who later split it up into more subspecies; describing each as a specific color morph, and sometimes having a separate behavioral pattern. The acoustics, morphs, and behavior of the species have been extensively researched.

== Habitat ==
This frog has been found in primary and old-growth secondary rainforests between 200 and 1200 meters above sea level. This frog is diurnal, with two periods of activity, one early in the day and one later.

The male frogs are territorial, and will attack other males that enter their range. Generally, the frog chooses one good plant to retreat to and works from there. Mated pairs have closely overlapping ranges.

== Diet ==
These frogs eat ants, mites, and other invertebrates, such as flies, beetles, and springtails.

== Color morphology ==
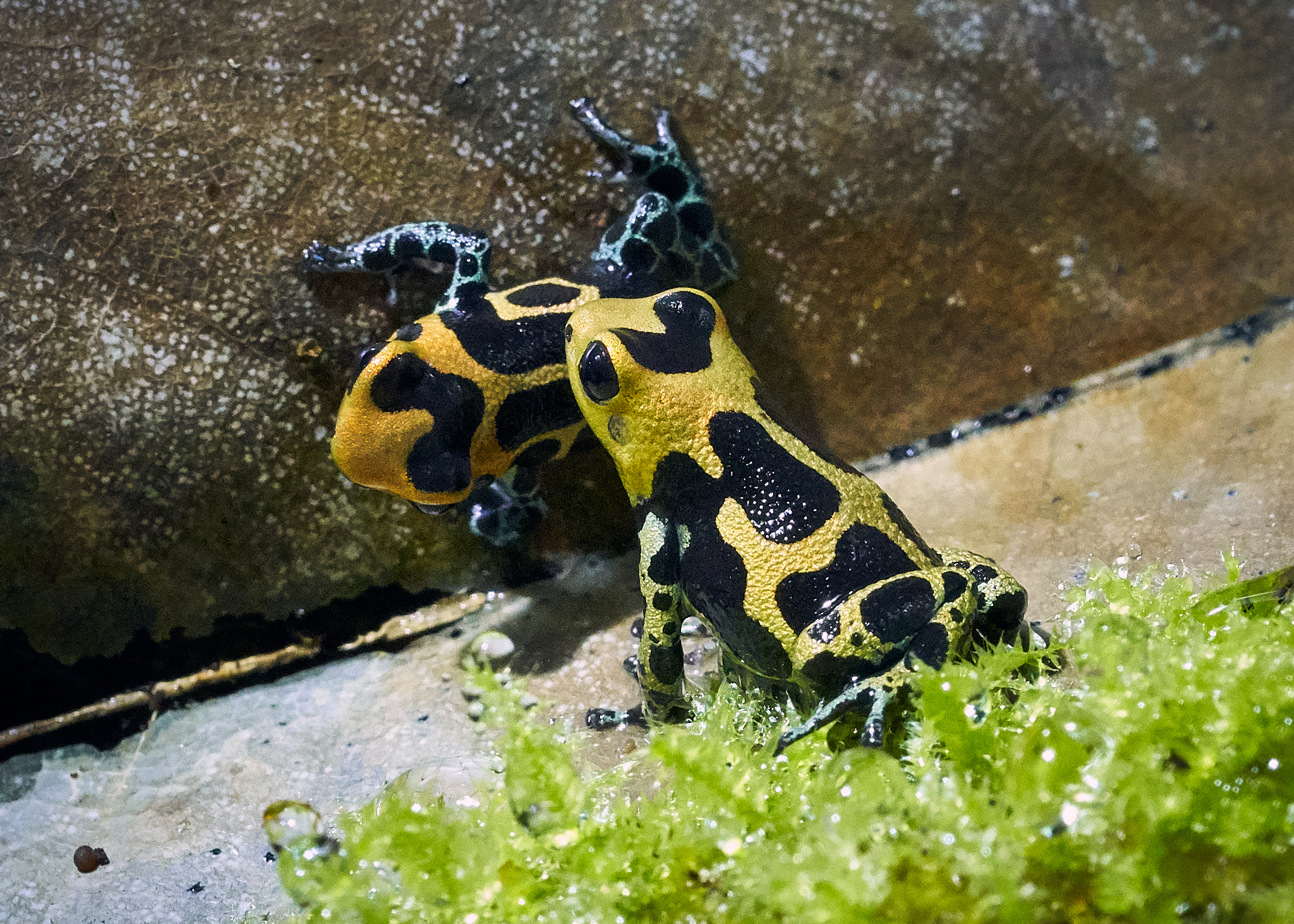
Captive-bred R. imitator 'Chazuta'

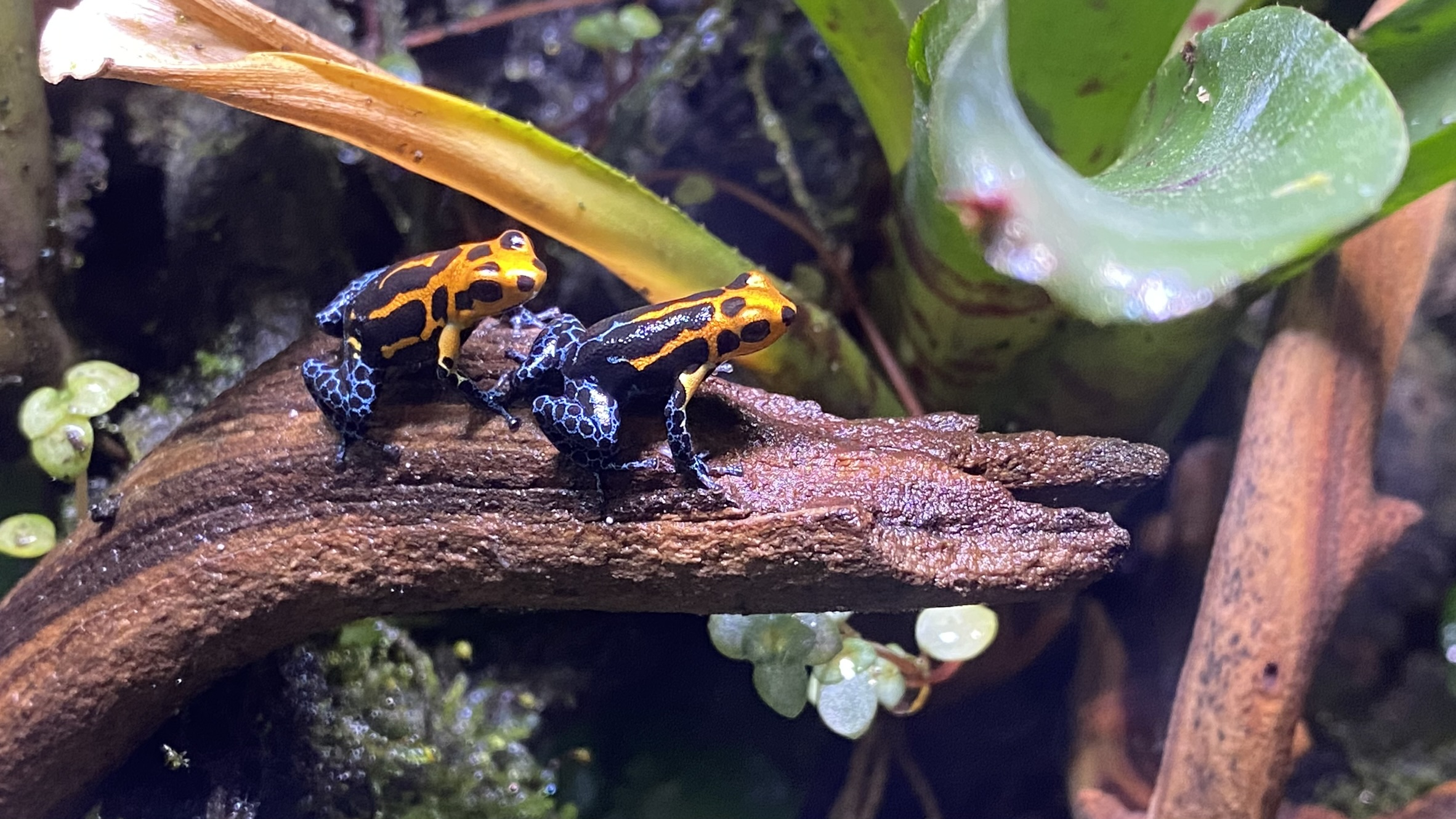
Ranitomeya imitator "Varadero" poison dart frog

Among different populations of R. imitator, different color morphs are present to mimic other poison frog species. There are four color morphs among R. imitator populations that mimic closely related sympatric (existing in the same area) species: varadero (R. fantastica), striped (lowland R. variabilis), spotted (highland R. variabilis), and banded (R. summersi). The geographic distribution of these morphs primarily includes geographically isolated populations in different areas of Peru, however there are a number of "transition zones" between populations where different color morphs interact. The striped morph is the most widely spread, mimicking the striped Ranitomeya variabilis and can be found throughout the lower Huallaga River drainage in Peru. The spotted morph mimics the highland spotted frog Ranitomeya variabilis with mainly blue-green coloration, but can be found in other forms, sometimes in yellow. Although R. imitator closely resembles R. variabilis in coloration with its striped morph, the two species differ in many key aspects. R. imitator provides biparental care and is a monogamous species, while R. variabilis provides solely paternal care and is polygamous. The aradero morph is a lowland form that lives nearby another but does not resemble it. Last, the banded morph, a mimic of Ranitomeya summersi, lives in much drier climates than the average R. imitator and is most often found in Dieffenbachia and Heliconia plants.

=== Interactions between different morphs ===
While populations of different color morphs are concentrated in different areas of Peru, there are transition zones between populations where different color morphs may interact. These transition zones have been particular areas of interest to study reproductive isolation and incipient speciation, and recent research suggests that color pattern is likely a driving factor in reproductive isolation, as some transition zones show evidence of assortative mating, where individuals of one morph prefer to mate with others of the same morph. Mating calls by males are an important factor in mating, and often need to be distinct in order to attract females of the same species. In R. imitator, male calls vary little among different color morphs, however it has been suggested that color pattern is the principal component that drives speciation.

== Toxicity ==
Like most other Ranitomeya species, R. imitator has a mild toxicity compared to other poison dart frogs. It produces the potent pumiliotoxin B, but its small size limits the amount of poison it can secrete. Like other poison dart frogs, it does not produce toxin in captivity. It probably gains its poison from consuming toxic insects or other invertebrates in the wild. Frogs of the related genus Phyllobates may derive their toxins from local melyrid beetles of genus Choresine.

== Reproduction and parental care ==
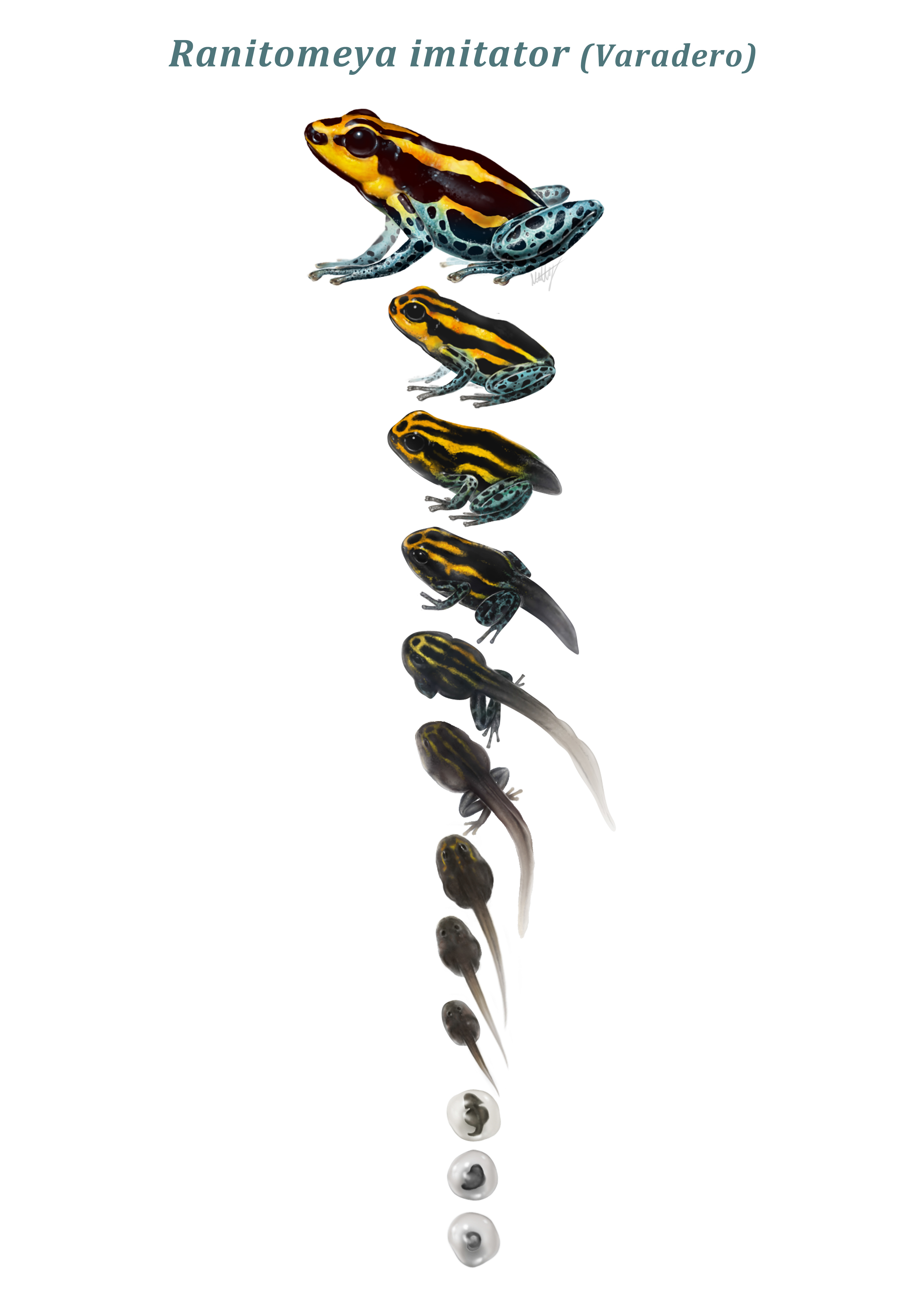
Ranitomeya imitator's developmental life stages.

The reproductive and parental care behaviors exhibited by this species have been of great interest to a variety of researchers, namely because R. imitator is the first amphibian to show evidence of monogamy, and because it independently evolved biparental care. Further, the occurrence of both of these factors supports the hypothesis that biparental care favors the evolution of monogamy, for which evidence has previously been restricted to other groups of vertebrates. The parental care provided to R. imitator offspring has been demonstrated to be vital for offspring growth and success.

=== Courtship and oviposition ===
To attract mates, males will initiate calls while approaching a female. If the female is receptive to the male's courtship, she will follow him to an oviposition site where they will mate. She will then deposit fertilized eggs on a plant to allow them to develop. The number of tadpoles that successfully hatch and make it to their breeding pool is relatively small, where one study observed a range of 1-4 tadpoles per mated pair.

=== Male parental care ===
After mating occurs, the male will guard the fertilized eggs. Upon hatching, the male will transport individual tadpoles to their own respective phytotelma, which are small pools of water within plants. Additionally, the male will strategically place tadpoles in certain rearing sites, specifically avoiding predators. After tadpoles are in their rearing sites, the male will call while next to tadpoles which signals to the mother to feed an individual. Tadpole begging, a behavior in which tadpoles vibrate their body, also encourages the mother to provide trophic (eggs specifically for nutrition) eggs.

=== Female parental care ===
Female parental care is provided in the form of trophic egg feeding to offspring. After mating, the female will have a surplus of unfertilized eggs, which she provisions to offspring as food that aids in offspring growth and development. This form of biparental care is not uncommon in poison frogs. Researchers have found that poison frogs that use phytotelma to rear offspring are more likely to exhibit egg-feeding parental care, and that this combination favors the evolution of biparental care in these species. The hormonal regulation of parental care in this species remains somewhat unknown.

== Threats ==
Compared to many other dart frog species, Ranitomeya imitator has relatively large and stable wild populations. What threat it faces comes from habitat loss associated with farming, livestock cultivation, and logging. People also illegally collect and export this frog for the international pet trade. They have also been imported legally, and multiple captive-bred varieties exist in the pet trade.
