= Ranitomeya defleri =

Conservation status
- Least Concern (IUCN 3.1)

Scientific classification
- Kingdom: Animalia
- Phylum: Chordata
- Class: Amphibia
- Order: Anura
- Family: Dendrobatidae
- Genus: Ranitomeya
- Species: R. defleri

Binomial name
- Ranitomeya defleri Twomey and Brown, 2009

Species of frog

Ranitomeya defleri is a species of frog in the family Dendrobatidae. It is known from two sites in Colombia and Brazil, respectively.

== Description ==
The adult male frog measures 15.3–17.7 mm in from nose to rear end. The skin of the head and dorsum is black with large yellow blotches behind the eyes. There are other yellow marks on the head and a yellow-green vertebral stripe. There is a yellow mark in the shape of an hourglass under the chin. The belly and all four legs are black with dark blue reticulations that form spots on the legs and other marks on the ventrum.

== Etymology ==
Scientists named this frog for Thomas Defler, a primatologist who worked in Colombia for 32 years and founded the Estación Biológica Caparú.

== Habitat ==
This semi-arboreal frog inhabits lowland primary forest that remains wet year-round. When found, the frog was always near flowing water. This frog was observed at 68 meters above sea level and 98 meters above sea level.

== Life cycle ==
The male frog sits at the bottom of a tree or on a bromeliad plant high in the branches calls to the female frogs. Scientists describe his call a buzz. Tadpoles have been observed swimming in pools of water in bromeliads.

== Threats ==
The IUCN classifies this frog as least concern of extinction due to its presumed large range, which includes at least one protected park: Parque Nacional Natural Yaigojé Apaporis.

== Original description ==
- Twomey E; Brown JL (2009). "Another new species of Ranitomeya (Anura: Dendrobatidae) from Amazonian Colombia". Zootaxa. 2302 (1): 48–60. doi:10.11646/zootaxa.2302.1.4.
