= Ranitomeya yavaricola =

- Ranitomeya yavaricola in Atalaia do Norte, Amazonas, Brazil

Conservation status
- Data Deficient (IUCN 3.1)

Scientific classification
- Kingdom: Animalia
- Phylum: Chordata
- Class: Amphibia
- Order: Anura
- Family: Dendrobatidae
- Genus: Ranitomeya
- Species: R. yavaricola

Binomial name
- Ranitomeya yavaricola Pérez-Peña, Chávez, Twomey, and Brown, 2010

Species of frog

Ranitomeya yavaricola is a species of frog in the family Dendrobatidae. It is endemic to Peru and possibly nearby Brazil.

== Description ==
The adult male frog measures about 15.2–17.7 mm in snout-vent length and two adult female frogs were found to measure 16.8 and 17.7 mm. Sexual dimorphism appears to be limited to a slight difference in size, with larger females. The skin of the frog's body is black with turquoise spots and stripes on the back. There is one dot on the inside of each eye. The belly is blue-green with black spots. The iris of the eye is black in color.

Scientists used to think this was the same frog as Ranitomeya flavovittata, but R. flavovitata has black marks on its legs and R. yavaricola does not.

== Habitat ==
Despite considerable searching, scientists still know this frog solely from the type locality: The oxbow lake Lago Preto Paredón in Peru, 120 meters above sea level.

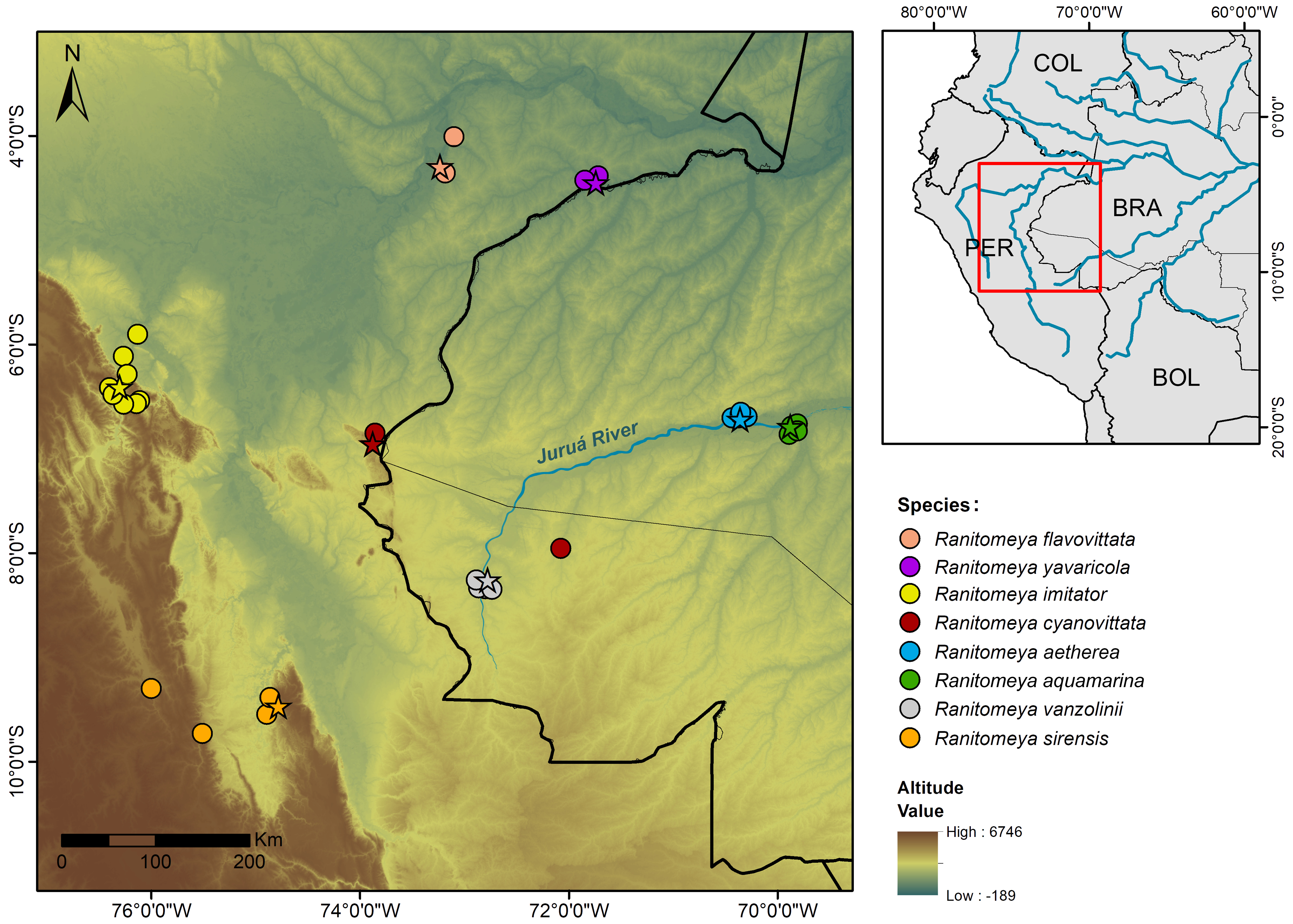
Geographic distribution of the species of the Ranitomeya vanzolinii species group. R. yavaricola is in purple in the top right.

This frog seems to prefer forests that never, but it has been observed near swamp. It lives in places with lots of Geonoma palms. it has been observed sitting on shrubs, branches, and epiphytes, hiding by roots and in plants.

== Life cycle ==
The female frog lays her eggs in pools of water in bromeliad plants, where the tadpoles later develop.

== Threats ==
The IUCN classifies this species as data deficient but notes that its habitat includes protected areas. However, the nearby forests, where the frog is presumed to also live, have several logging concessions. Like many frogs in Ranitomeya, there are concerns about R. yavaricola being caught and sold on the illegal pet trade. While scientists have noted some interested buyers, no one has been caught selling it yet. Scientists believe this is because the frog is so hard to find in the wild.

== Original description ==
- Perez-Pena PE; Chavez G; Twomey E; Brown JL (2010). "Two new species of Ranitomeya (Anura: Dendrobatidae) from eastern Amazonian Peru". Zootaxa (Abstract). 2439: 1–23. doi:10.11646/zootaxa.2439.1.1.
