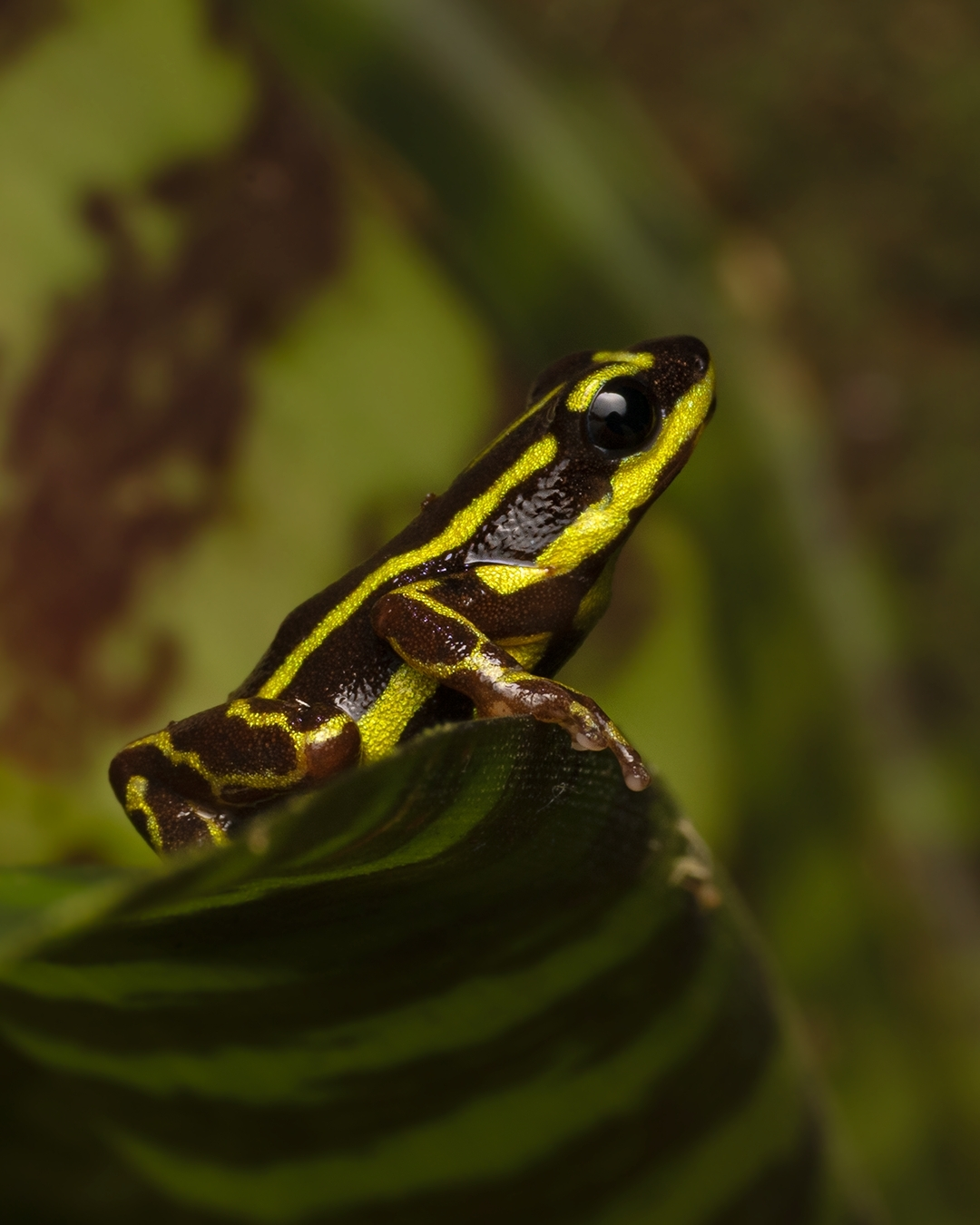

Conservation status
- Least Concern (IUCN 3.1)

Scientific classification
- Kingdom: Animalia
- Phylum: Chordata
- Class: Amphibia
- Order: Anura
- Family: Dendrobatidae
- Genus: Ranitomeya
- Species: R. cyanovittata

Binomial name
- Ranitomeya cyanovittata Pérez-Peña, Chávez, Twomey, and Brown, 2010

= Ranitomeya cyanovittata =

Species of frog

Ranitomeya cyanovittata is a species of frog in the family Dendrobatidae. It is native to Peru and scientists expect it also lives in Brazil.

== Description ==
Two adult frogs, one male and one female, measured 13.8 mm and 17.3 mm in snout-vent length, respectively. The skin of the frog's body is black with light blue spots and stripes all over the body, head, and legs. There are also some brown marks on the belly. The iris of the eye is black in color.

== Habitat ==
This frog diurnal frog lives in undisturbed upland forests near streams and other waters. People have observed this frog foraging for food in leaf litter. Scientists conclude that it prefers areas with partial coverage from ferns and other small plants. The frog has been observed between 200 and 400 meters above sea level. This frog's young live in pools of water in Heliconia plants.

== Threats ==
Scientists have classified this frog as least concern of extinction because of its large, undisturbed range. Because the frog's habitat is far from most human settlements and only accessible by helicopter, it has not been subject to much habitat loss.

The frog's range includes at least one protected park: Parque Nacional del Serra do Divisor.

== Original description ==
- Perez-Pena PE; Chavez G; Twomey E; Brown JL (2010). "Two new species of Ranitomeya (Anura: Dendrobatidae) from eastern Amazonian Peru". Zootaxa (Abstract). 2439: 1–23. doi:10.11646/zootaxa.2439.1.1.
