= Ranitomeya flavovittata =

Conservation status
- Least Concern (IUCN 3.1)

Scientific classification
- Kingdom: Animalia
- Phylum: Chordata
- Class: Amphibia
- Order: Anura
- Family: Dendrobatidae
- Genus: Ranitomeya
- Species: R. flavovittata

Binomial name
- Ranitomeya flavovittata (Schulte, 1999)

Synonyms
- Dendrobates flavovittatus Schulte, 1999

Species of frog

Ranitomeya flavovittata is a species of frog in the family Dendrobatidae. It is endemic to Peru and known with certainty only from the Loreto Region where its type locality is.

== Habitat and conservation ==
Ranitomeya flavovittata occur in old-growth and secondary tropical forests. They have been observed 500 meters above sea level.

== Life cycle ==
They seem to use Guzmania bromeliads for breeding. Male adults have been observed carrying tadpoles. In other species in Ranitomeya, the female frogs lay eggs on the ground or in leaf litter, and the adult frogs carry the tadpoles to pools of water in plants after hatching.

== Threats ==
The IUCN classifies this frog as least concern of extinction because of its large range. What threat it faces comes from deforestation associated with subsistence farming, wood harvesting, and logging. People also capture this frog to sell as part of the international pet trade.

The frog's known range includes one protected park: Reserva Comunal Tamshiyacu-Tahuayo.
