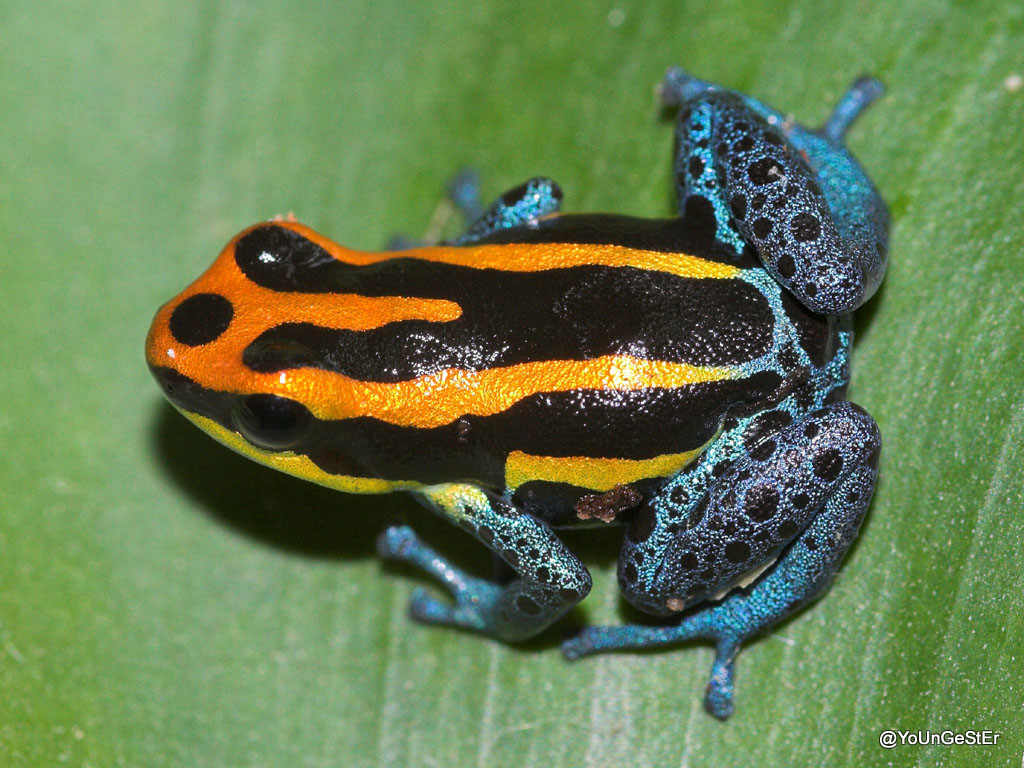

Conservation status
- Least Concern (IUCN 3.1)

Scientific classification
- Kingdom: Animalia
- Phylum: Chordata
- Class: Amphibia
- Order: Anura
- Family: Dendrobatidae
- Genus: Ranitomeya
- Species: R. amazonica

Binomial name
- Ranitomeya amazonica (Schulte, 1999)

Synonyms
- Dendrobates amazonicus Schulte, 1999

= Ranitomeya amazonica =

Species of amphibian

Ranitomeya amazonica is a poison dart frog in the genus Ranitomeya. It was first described by Rainer Schulte in 1999 as Dendrobates amazonicus when he separated it from Dendrobates ventrimaculatus, primarily on the basis of call characteristics. The validity of the species has been debated, but further studies, also including genetic data, support its validity.

== Distribution and habitat ==
This species has only been confirmed to reside in northeastern Peru within the Amazon Basin. It is diurnal and lives in primary forest and older secondary forest. Most of its habitats are pristine, but it has shown some tolerance to disturbance. It has been observed between 0 and 200 meters above sea level.

== Conservation status and threats ==
It is listed as "Least Concern" on the IUCN Red List based on the assessment from 2023. What threat it faces comes from habitat loss associated with agriculture and cattle cultivation.

An assessment of fifteen frogs in French Guiana showed that about 13 percent were infected with the fungus Batrachochytrium dendrobatidis, which causes chytridiomycosis.

This frog has been seen on the international pet trade, but because it is also raised in captivity, it is difficult to tell whether any given frog was raised in captivity or captured in the wild.

The frog occurs in at least two protected parks, Reserva Nacional Alpahuayo Mishana and Reserva Comunal Tamshiyacu-Tahuayo, and scientists infer it could live in many more.

== Description ==
Ranitomeya amazonica is 16–19 mm long with smooth, black skin. The torso is laterally striped orange or red while the legs and arms feature a mesh of blue, grey or green on black. There is no explicit sexual dimorphism in this frog, but females tend to be slightly bigger than males.
