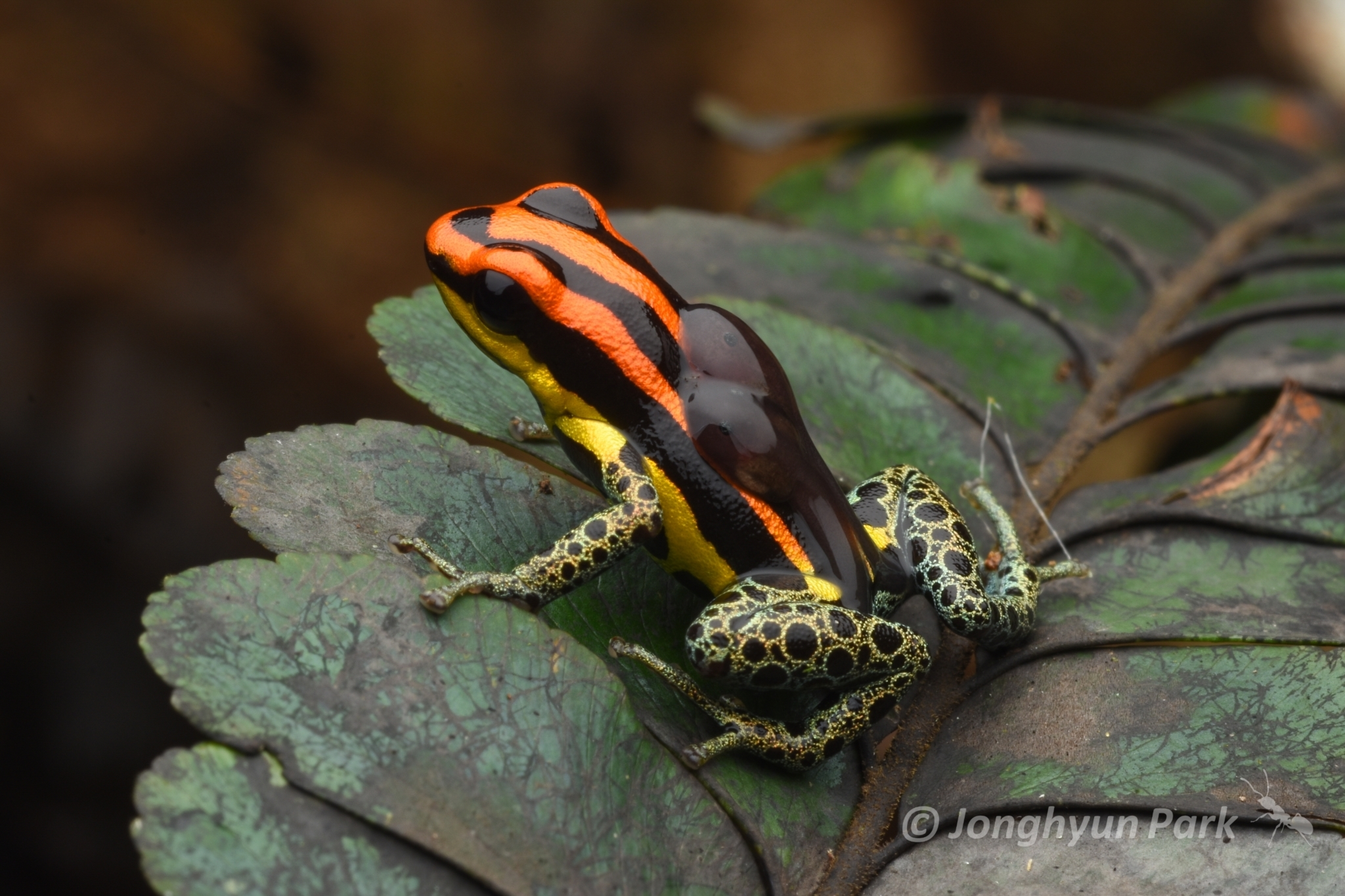

Conservation status
- Least Concern (IUCN 3.1)

Scientific classification
- Kingdom: Animalia
- Phylum: Chordata
- Class: Amphibia
- Order: Anura
- Family: Dendrobatidae
- Genus: Ranitomeya
- Species: R. uakarii

Binomial name
- Ranitomeya uakarii (Brown, Schulte, and Summers, 2006)

Synonyms
- Dendrobates uakarii

= Ranitomeya uakarii =

Species of amphibian

Ranitomeya uakarii, known as the red uakari poison frog, is a species of frog in the family Dendrobatidae. The species can be found in the Amazon basin, specifically in Brazil and Peru.

== Description ==
The adult frog measures about 13.04–16.16 mm (0.513–0.636 in) in snout-vent length. This frog has unusual coloration: Red-orange stripes down its sides and backbone against a black background. It has wide yellow stripes on its flanks. It has a black mark in the shape of the letter U on its head. All four legs are blue with small, fine black dots and spots. The iris of the eye is black in color.

== Habitat ==
This frog inhabits primary and longstanding secondary rainforests, though it is not limited to these habitats. This frog is primarily terrestrial but has been known to climb into the canopy several meters above the forest floor. This frog has been observed as high as 500 meters above sea level.

== Life cycle ==
The male frog finds a high perch and calls to the females in a buzzing voice. The frogs can reproduce all year, with reproductive capacity limited by food and bromeliad breeding sites. The female frog lays 2–7 eggs per clutch. If there is enough food, she can lay eggs four times a month, all year.

== Threats ==
The IUCN classifies this frog as least concern of extinction because of its large range and population. It may be in danger in some locations because of deforestation in favor of agriculture and overharvesting for the international pet trade.
