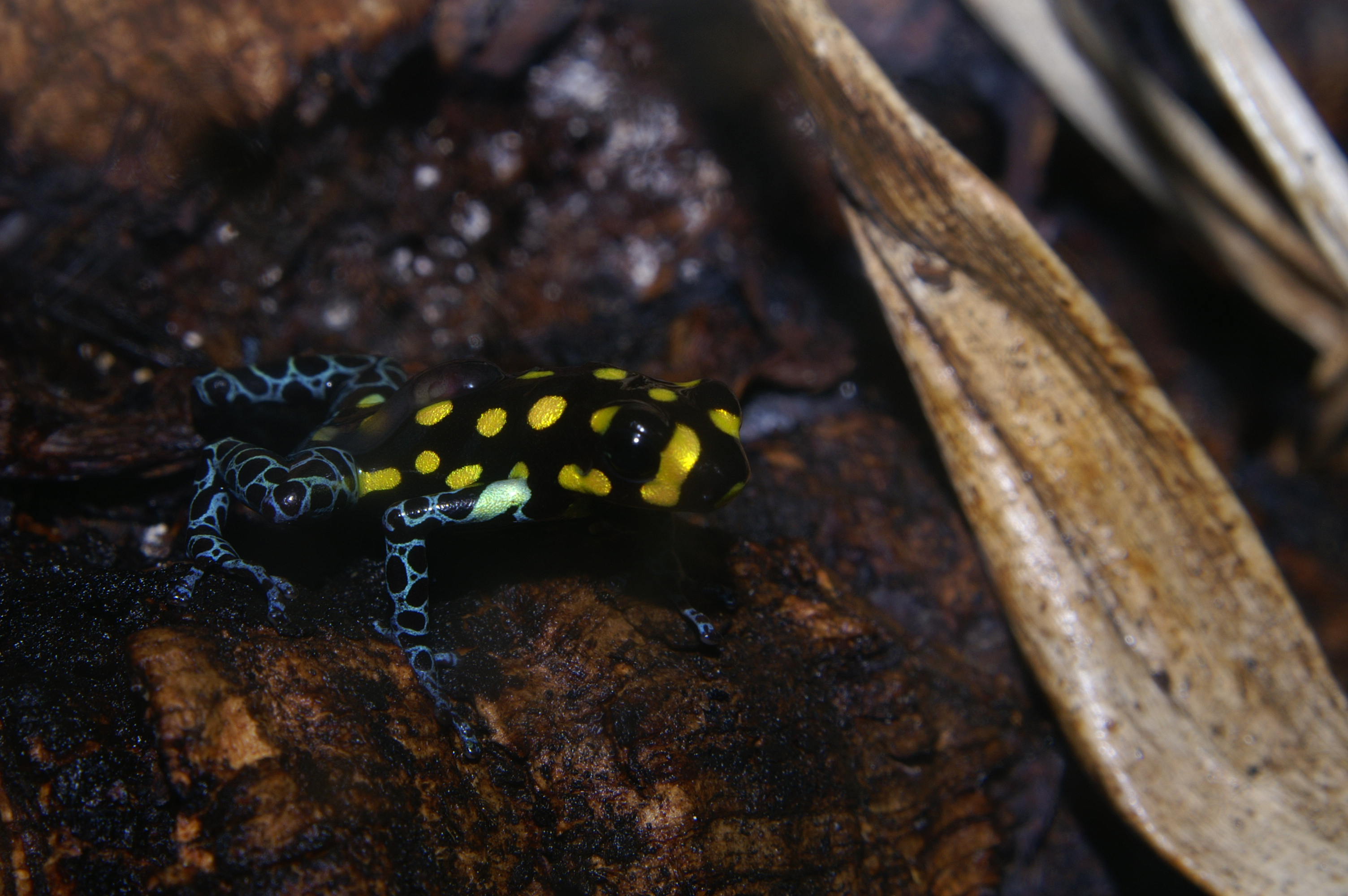

Conservation status
- Least Concern (IUCN 3.1)

Scientific classification
- Kingdom: Animalia
- Phylum: Chordata
- Class: Amphibia
- Order: Anura
- Family: Dendrobatidae
- Genus: Ranitomeya
- Species: R. vanzolinii

Binomial name
- Ranitomeya vanzolinii (Myers, 1982)

Synonyms
- Dendrobates vanzolinii Myers, 1982

= Ranitomeya vanzolinii =

Species of frog

Ranitomeya vanzolinii, also known as the Brazilian poison frog or spotted poison frog, is a species of frog in the Ranitomeya genus, from the poison dart frog family, Dendrobatidae. It is found in the Amazonian rainforests of Brazil and Perú, and possibly Bolivia.

== Etymology ==
The specific name vanzolinii honors Paulo Vanzolini, a Brazilian herpetologist and composer.

== Description ==
When fully grown, R. vanzolinii grows to around 16.7–19 mm (0.66–0.75 in) in snout–vent length. This species will feed on a variety of tiny invertebrates, including ants and mites.

During the breeding season, males have a "cricket"-like, trilling call, which attracts females. Unlike some dendrobatid frogs, R. vanzolinii parents actively protect and feed their tadpoles. The female will lay a fertile egg (or eggs) in a tiny pool of collected rainwater, typically within the central funnel, or "cup", of a bromeliad. Once the eggs hatch, the female is encouraged by the male to lay an infertile egg into the same small pool, in an effort to provide the young with a source of nutrition until it sprouts limbs and can fend for itself. The parents form a monogamous pair during this period.

== Habitat and conservation ==
The species' natural habitats are pre-montane cloud forests and lowland rainforests between 300 and 1280 metres above sea level, especially forests with bamboo and bromeliad plants, which can form the phytotelms that they use for breeding. Adults are primarily arboreal, mostly found up to 2 metres above ground, occasionally higher. The frog's range includes protected parks such as Parque Nacional da Serra do Divisor and Reserva Extrativista do Alto Juruá.

The IUCN classifies this frog as least concern of extinction because of its large range, much of which has remained intact, and its presumed large population. What threat it faces comes from habitat loss associated with agriculture, livestock rearing, and logging. It is also harvested wild for the international pet trade. In one bust in Lima, Peru, officials found hundreds of frogs packed in tubes for transport to Europe, hidden among a shipment of tropical fish, and half of them were dead.
