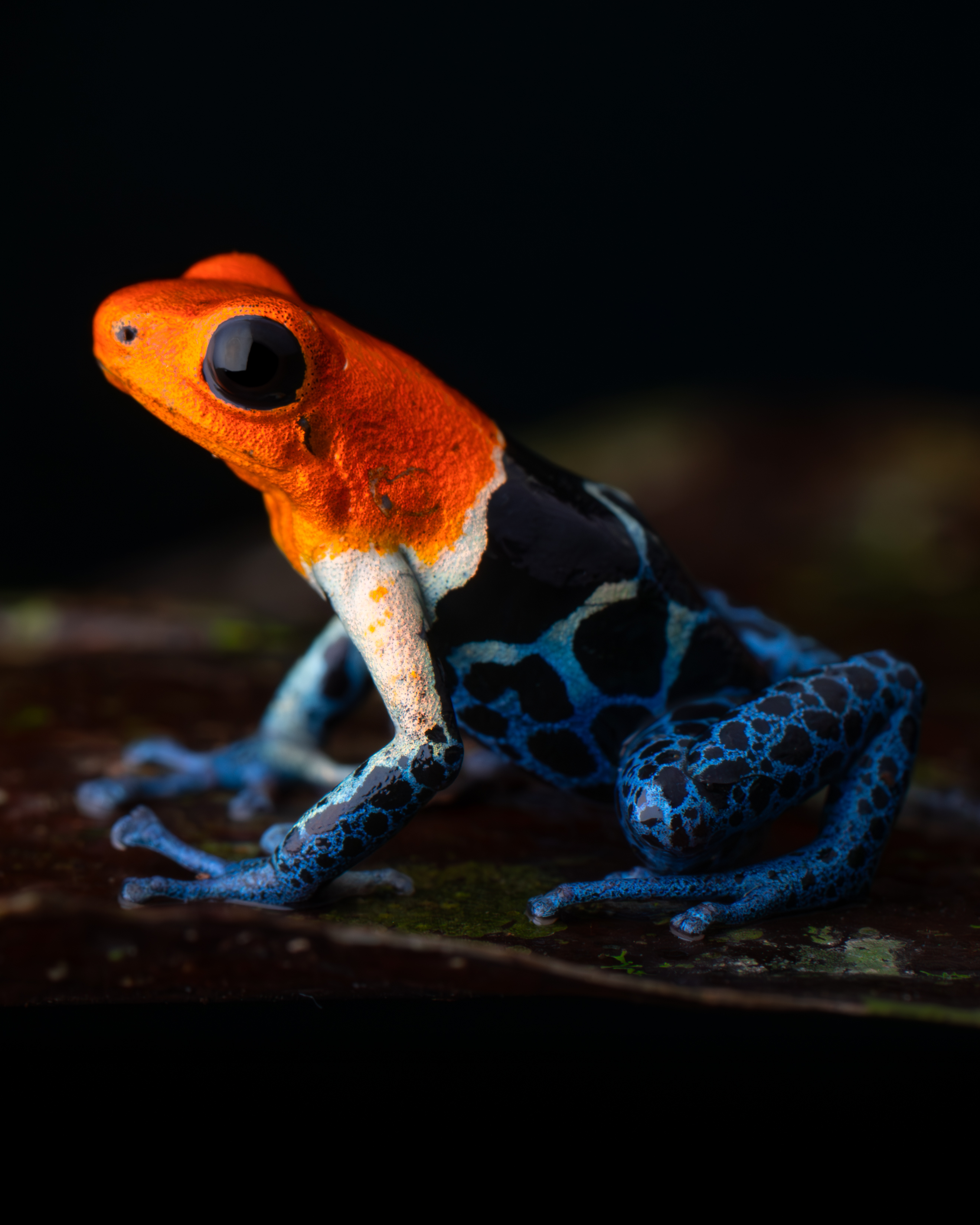

Conservation status
- Vulnerable (IUCN 3.1)

Scientific classification
- Kingdom: Animalia
- Phylum: Chordata
- Class: Amphibia
- Order: Anura
- Family: Dendrobatidae
- Genus: Ranitomeya
- Species: R. fantastica

Binomial name
- Ranitomeya fantastica (Boulenger, 1884)

Synonyms
- Dendrobates fantasticus Boulenger, 1884 "1883"

= Red-headed poison frog =

Species of amphibian

The red-headed poison frog, fantastic poison frog, or crowned poison frog (Ranitomeya fantastica) is a species of frog in the family Dendrobatidae. It is endemic to Peru and found in the northern San Martín and Loreto Regions.

== Appearance ==
The adult frog measures approximately 20-25 mm in snout-vent length. The anterior region of the body, including the head but excluding the forelimbs, is characterized by a bright yellow coloration bordered in white, although variations ranging from red to orange to yellow have been documented. The posterior region of the body exhibits a predominantly black pigmentation with grey reticulations.

== Habitat ==
Its natural habitats are primary and older secondary growth wet forests. The species uses phytotelmata for breeding, which must be present in its habitat. This frog has been observed between 180 and 1200 meters above sea level. Some R. fantastica populations are heavily arboreal and some are not.

== Reproduction ==
The female frog lays eggs on the undersides of leaves. The male frog moves the eggs, putting each one in a different place to prevent tadpole-on-tadpole cannibalism.

== Threats ==
The IUCN classifies this frog as vulnerable to extinction. The species is threatened by collection for international pet trade as well as habitat loss associated with the cultivation of bananas and coffee.

The frog's range includes one protected park: Allpahuayo-Mishana National Reserve.
