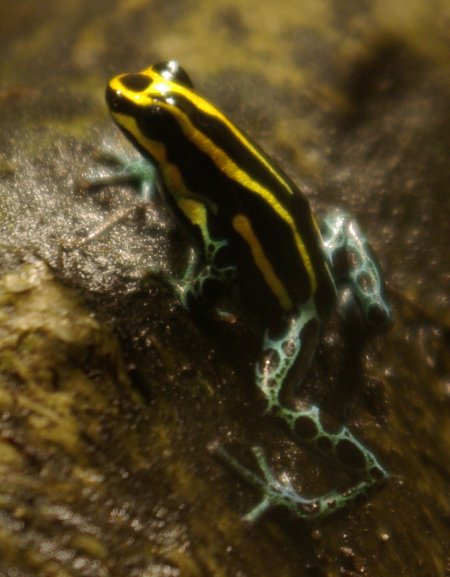

Conservation status
- Least Concern (IUCN 3.1)

Scientific classification
- Kingdom: Animalia
- Phylum: Chordata
- Class: Amphibia
- Order: Anura
- Family: Dendrobatidae
- Genus: Ranitomeya
- Species: R. ventrimaculata

Binomial name
- Ranitomeya ventrimaculata (Shreve, 1935)

Synonyms
- Dendrobates minutus ventrimaculatus Shreve, 1935; Dendrobates ventrimaculatus Shreve, 1935; Dendrobates duellmani Schulte, 1999

= Amazonian poison frog =

Species of amphibian

The Amazonian poison frog (Ranitomeya ventrimaculata), known in French as dendrobate à ventre tacheté, is a species of poison dart frog. It is native to South America, where it can be found in Brazil, southeastern Colombia, Ecuador, French Guiana, and Peru.

== Toxicity ==
R. ventrimaculata secretes poison through glands in the skin which protect it from fungi and bacteria as well as from predators, which are also warned to stay clear by the aposematic coloration. It is therefore often included among the poison dart frogs, although its toxin is comparatively weak. R. ventrimaculatus produces its poison by ingestion of a species of mite.

== Description ==
The frog is active during the day. It grows to a size of about 20 millimetres (0.79 in), with males smaller than females. Its base color is black, and it has yellow lines or dots on the back, whereas the belly has bluish or grayish color with interspersed black patches (hence the name "ventrimaculatus"); the color of the belly continues into a netlike pattern on the legs.

== Life cycle ==
R. ventrimaculata reach adulthood at an age of six months. The females attach four to eight eggs to leaves beneath the water level, where they are inseminated by the male. The tadpoles leave the eggs after 12 to 16 days, the male carries them one by one to puddles or similar minute bodies of water; as the tadpoles are omnivorous and cannibalistic, they are separated from each other in the process. Metamorphosis into a frog is complete after 60 to 80 days; at which point they become independent of their parents but tend to remain in close proximity.

== Habitat ==
This diurnal frog lives in the Amazon, specifically in primary rainforests that have deep leaf litter and thick understory. It has been observed between 200 and 500 meters above sea level.

== Threats ==
The IUCN classifies this frog as least concern of extinction because of its large range. What threat it faces comes from habitat loss associated with subsistence logging and fires. Scientists predict that harvesting for the international pet trade might also become an issue in the future, though they note this does not seem to be happening as of 2023.

The frog's range includes protected parks, such as Parque Nacional Yasuní, Comunidad Sarayaku, Estación de Biodiversidad Tiputini, and Reserva Comunal Tamshiyacu Tahuayo.
