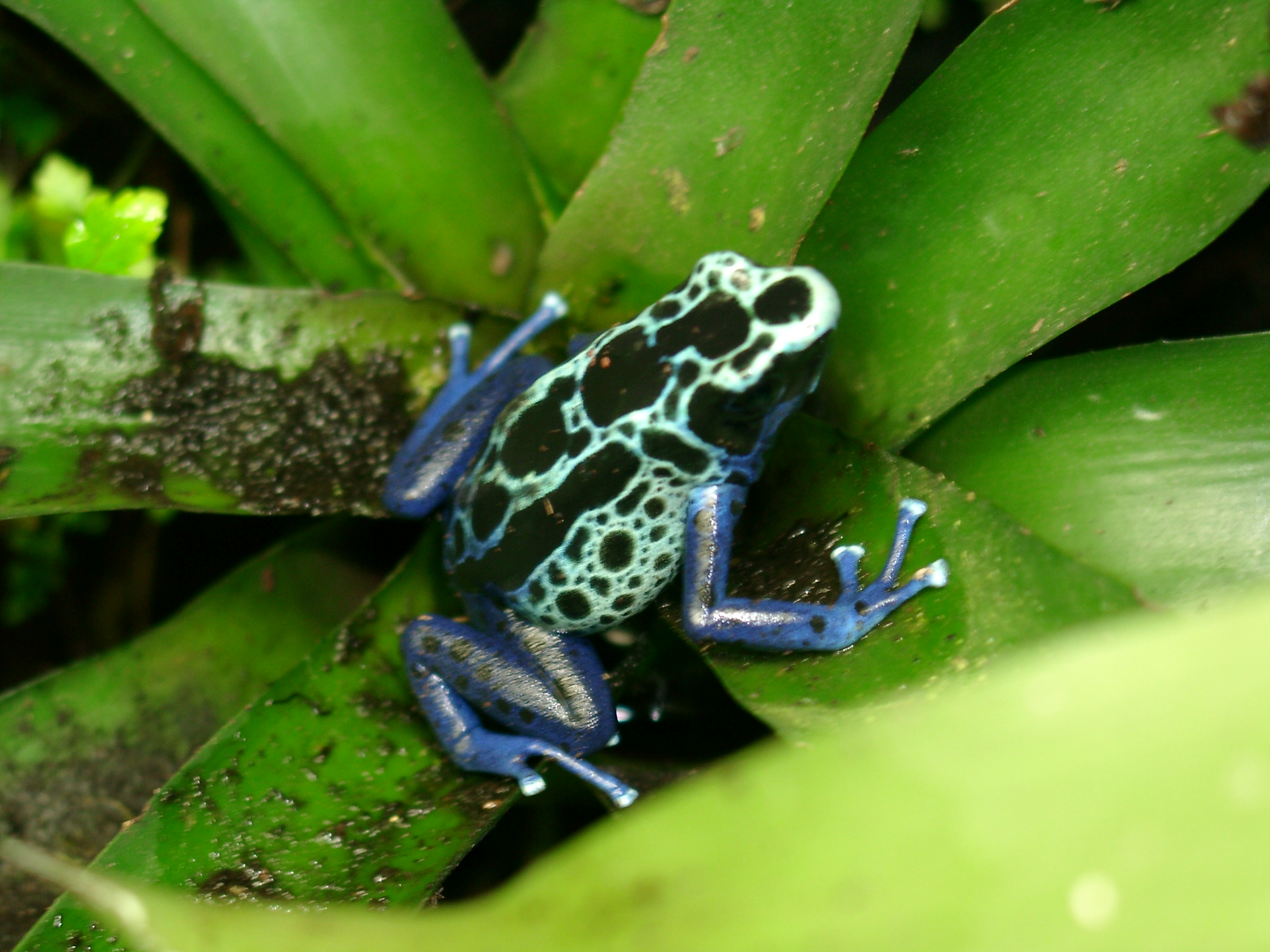
- Dyeing dart frog, Dendrobates tinctorius.

Scientific classification
- Kingdom: Animalia
- Phylum: Chordata
- Class: Amphibia
- Order: Anura
- Family: Dendrobatidae
- Subfamily: Dendrobatinae; Cope, 1865

Genera
- Adelphobates; Andinobates; Dendrobates; Excidobates; Minyobates; Oophaga; Phyllobates; Ranitomeya

= Dendrobatinae =

Subfamily of amphibians

Dendrobatinae is the main subfamily of frogs in the family Dendrobatidae, the poison dart frogs of Central and South America, found from Nicaragua to the Amazon basin in Brazil.

== Description ==
Dendrobatinae are generally small frogs; Andinobates minutus is as small as 13–16 mm (0.51–0.63 in) in snout–vent length. Many species are brightly colored and all are toxic. Alkaloids in Phyllobates are particularly potent.

All species are presumed to show parental care, often by the male. However, some species show biparental care (Ranitomeya), whereas in Oophaga only females care for the tadpoles, feeding them with eggs, their only source of nutrition. The males are responsible for protecting the eggs from predation and keeping the eggs from drying out by urinating on them.

== General ==
There are eight or seven genera in this subfamily:

Image	Genus	Living species
	Adelphobates Grant, Frost, Caldwell, Gagliardo, Haddad, Kok, Means, Noonan, Schargel, and Wheeler, 2006	Adelphobates castaneoticus (Caldwell and Myers, 1990); Adelphobates galactonotus (Steindachner, 1864); Adelphobates quinquevittatus (Steindachner, 1864)
	Andinobates Twomey, Brown, Amézquita, and Mejía-Vargas, 2011	Andinobates abditus (Myers and Daly, 1976); Andinobates altobueyensis (Silverstone, 1975); Andinobates bombetes (Myers and Daly, 1980); Andinobates cassidyhornae (Amézquita et al., 2013); Andinobates claudiae (Jungfer, Lötters, and Jörgens, 2000); Andinobates daleswansoni (Rueda-Almonacid, Rada, Sánchez-Pacheco, Velásquez-Álvarez, and Quevedo-Gil, 2006); Andinobates dorisswansonae (Rueda-Almonacid, Rada, Sánchez-Pacheco, Velásquez-Álvarez, and Quevedo-Gil, 2006); Andinobates fulguritus (Silverstone, 1975); Andinobates geminisae (Batista et al., 2014); Andinobates minutus (Shreve, 1935); Andinobates opisthomelas (Boulenger, 1899); Andinobates tolimensis (Bernal-Bautista, Luna-Mora, Gallego, and Quevedo-Gil, 2007); Andinobates viridis (Myers and Daly, 1976); Andinobates virolinensis (Ruiz-Carranza and Ramírez-Pinilla, 1992)
	Dendrobates Wagler, 1830	Dendrobates auratus (Girard, 1855) – Green and black poison dart frog; Dendrobates leucomelas (Steindachner, 1864) – Yellow-banded poison dart frog; Dendrobates nubeculosus Jungfer and Böhme 2004 - Rockstone poison dart frog; Dendrobates tinctorius (Schneider, 1799) – Dyeing dart frog; Dendrobates truncatus (Cope, 1861) – Yellow-striped poison frog
	Excidobates Twomey and Brown, 2008	Excidobates captivus (Myers, 1982) - Santiago poison frog, Peru and Ecuador; Excidobates condor Almendáriz, Ron, and Brito M., 2012 - Ecuador; Excidobates mysteriosus (Myers, 1982) - Marañón poison frog, Peru
	Minyobates Myers, 1987	Minyobates steyermarki - demonic poison frog, demonic poison-arrow frog
	Oophaga Bauer, 1994	Oophaga arborea (Myers, Daly, and Martínez, 1984) — Polkadot poison frog; Oophaga granulifera (Taylor, 1958) — Granular poison frog; Oophaga histrionica (Berthold, 1845) — Harlequin poison frog; Oophaga lehmanni (Myers and Daly, 1976) — Lehmann's poison frog; Oophaga occultator (Myers and Daly, 1976) — La Brea poison frog; Oophaga pumilio (Schmidt, 1857) — Strawberry poison-dart frog; Oophaga speciosa (Schmidt, 1857) — Splendid poison frog; Oophaga sylvatica (Funkhouser, 1956) — Diablito poison frog; Oophaga vicentei (Jungfer, Weygoldt, and Juraske, 1996) — Vicente's poison frog
	Phyllobates Duméril and Bibron, 1841	P. lugubris species group: Phyllobates lugubris (Schmidt, 1857); Phyllobates vittatus (Cope, 1893); P. bicolor species group: Phyllobates bicolor (Duméril and Bibron, 1841); Phyllobates aurotaenia (Boulenger, 1913); Phyllobates sp. aff. aurotaenia; Phyllobates terribilis (Myers, Daly, and Malkin, 1978)
	Ranitomeya Bauer, 1986	Ranitomeya aetherea Koch, Mônico, Dayrell, Ferreira, Dantas, Moravec, and Lima, 2025; Ranitomeya amazonica (Schulte, 1999); Ranitomeya aquamarina Mônico, Koch, Dayrell, Moravec and Lima, 2025; Ranitomeya benedicta Brown, Twomey, Pepper, and Sanchez-Rodriguez, 2008; Ranitomeya cyanovittata Pérez-Peña, Chávez, Twomey, and Brown, 2010; Ranitomeya defleri Twomey and Brown, 2009; Ranitomeya fantastica (Boulenger, 1884); Ranitomeya flavovittata (Schulte, 1999); Ranitomeya imitator (Schulte, 1986); Ranitomeya reticulata (Boulenger, 1884); Ranitomeya sirensis (Aichinger, 1991); Ranitomeya summersi Brown, Twomey, Pepper, and Sanchez-Rodriguez, 2008; Ranitomeya toraro Brown, Caldwell, Twomey, Melo-Sampaio, and Souza, 2011; Ranitomeya uakarii (Brown, Schulte, and Summers, 2006); Ranitomeya vanzolinii (Myers, 1982); Ranitomeya variabilis (Zimmermann and Zimmermann, 1988); Ranitomeya ventrimaculata (Shreve, 1935); Ranitomeya yavaricola Pérez-Peña, Chávez, Twomey, and Brown, 2010

The most specious genera are Ranitomeya (18 species) and Andinobates (16 species). Dendrobates used to be much larger but currently contains only five species, having had most of its species split off into genera erected later.
