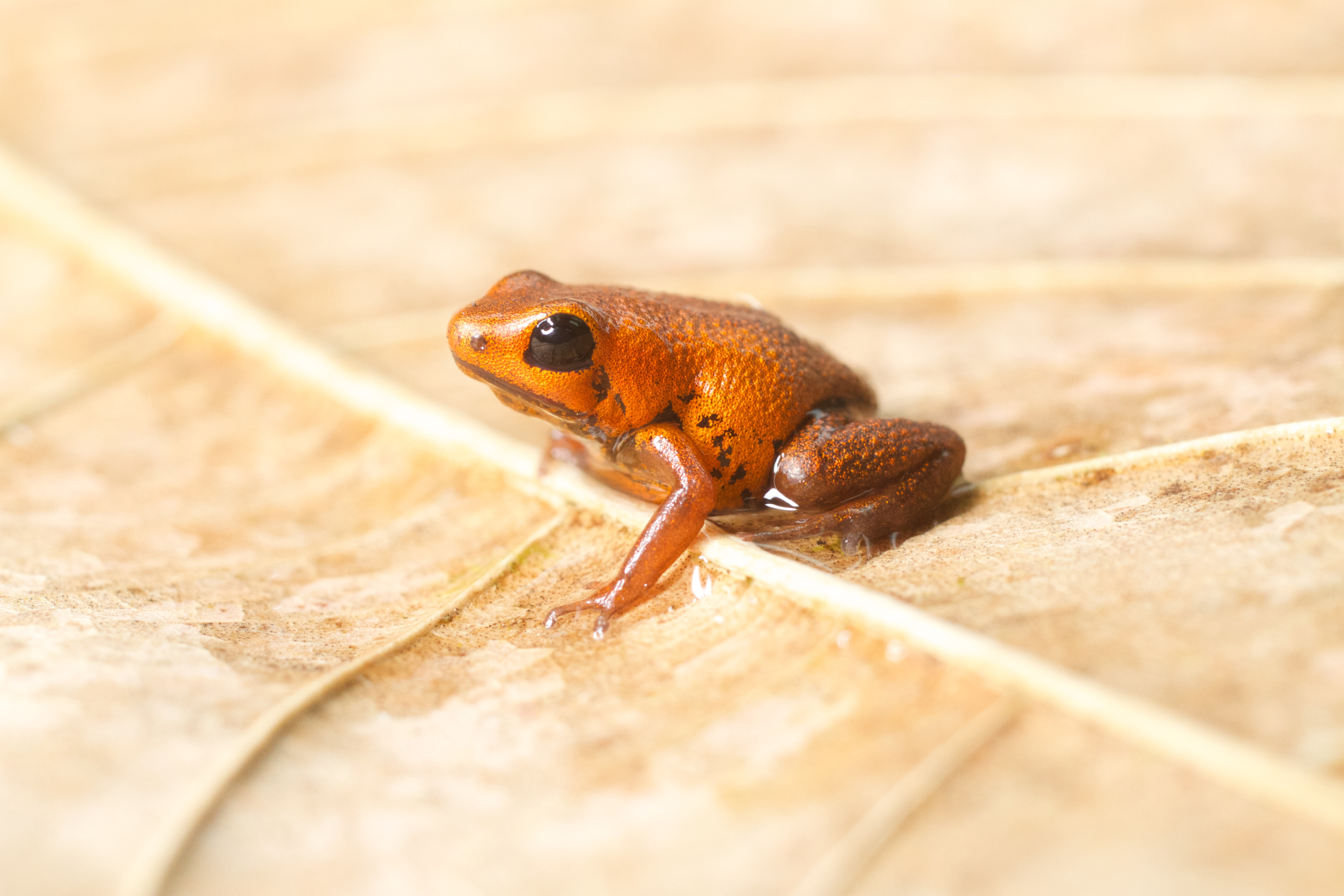

Scientific classification
- Kingdom: Animalia
- Phylum: Chordata
- Class: Amphibia
- Order: Anura
- Family: Dendrobatidae
- Genus: Andinobates
- Species: A. geminisae

Binomial name
- Andinobates geminisae Batista et al., 2014

= Geminis' dart frog =

Species of frog

The Geminis' dart frog (Andinobates geminisae) is a species of poison-dart frog distinguished by its uniquely small size and memorable mating call.

Due to the recent and remote nature of its discovery, there is much about the adaptive behaviors and demography of the Geminis' dart frog yet to be studied. The feet do not have any webbing and females are slightly larger than the males. It possesses a rounded, slender snout with outward facing external nares. Darker pigmentation is observed on the lower mandible and betwixt the eyes.

== Anatomy and morphology ==
This small frog is 11 to 13 mm long and smooth chrome orange skin. The feet do not have any webbing and females are slightly larger than the males. It possesses a rounded, slender snout with outward facing external nares. Darker pigmentation is observed on the lower mandible and betwixt the eyes.

== Distribution and habitat ==
Colón Province, Panama

The habitat of A. geminisae is lush rainforest. This animal is endemic to West Central Panama and relatives within the Dendrobatid (poison dart frog) family are similarly found across Panama as well as the Colombian Andes. It can be spotted under rocks, logs, near tree roots, and atop leaf litter on dry, elevated ridges. Up to 15 individuals have been recorded at populated sites in the Donoso region, specifically in a slight portion of the Rio Belén basin.

== Behaviour and reproduction ==
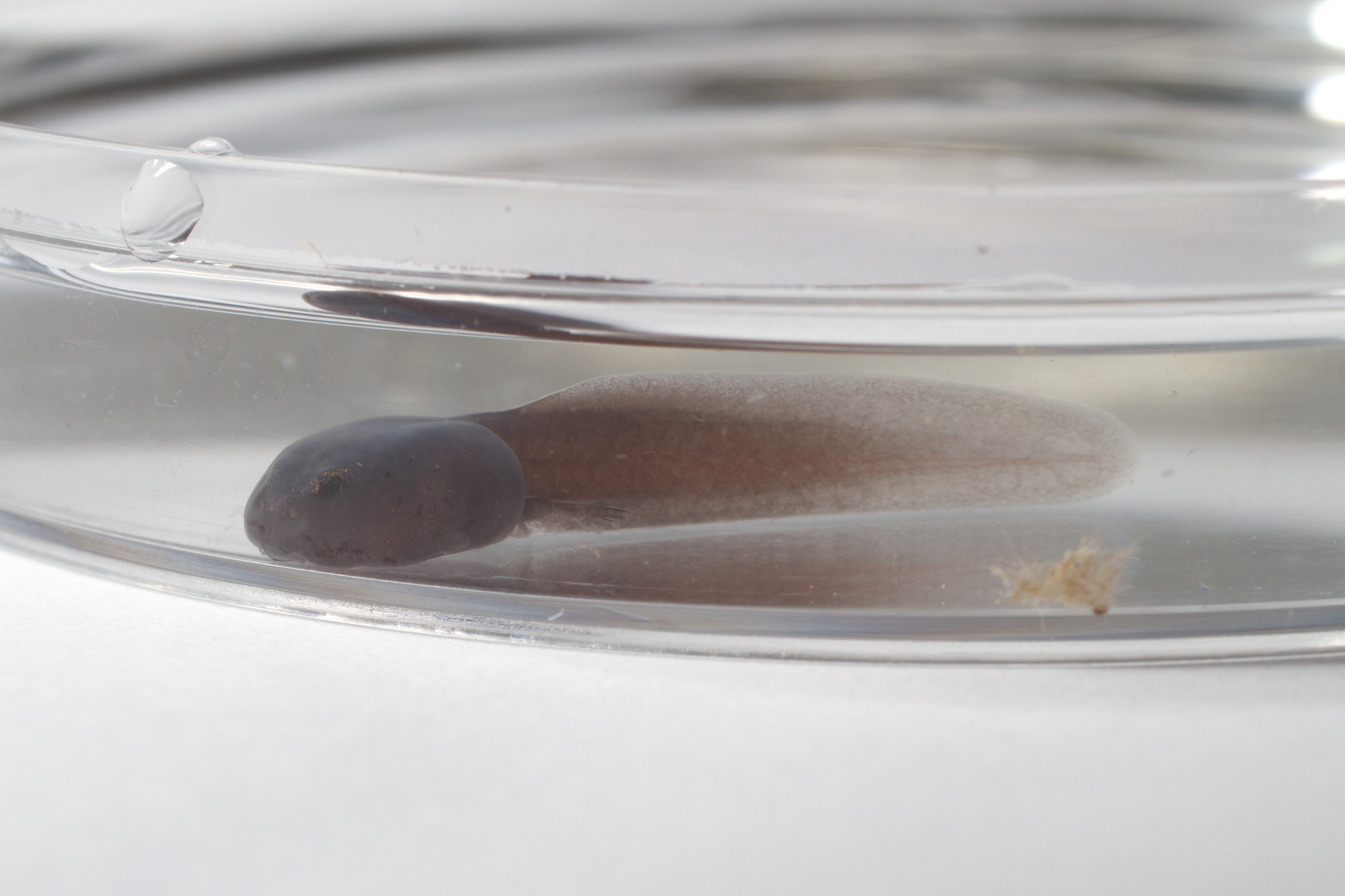
Tadpole Andinobates geminisae egg Andinobates gemisae carrying a juvenile on its back

The call of this amphibian is buzz-like, with a relatively high amount of pulses per note and lower dominant frequency than advertisement calls of similar species such as the Andean and Blue-bellied poison frogs. Cupped leaves and tree hollows full of water are used as areas to lay their eggs. Bromeliads and pitcher plants have been shown preference. There is photographic evidence that the male Geminis' dart frogs carries its tadpoles on its back, as characteristic of the high parental investment by both sexes seen in all Neotropical poison frogs.

== Taxonomy and discovery ==
The scientific name of the Geminis' dart frog is Andinobates geminisae. Dr. Marcus Ponce, a co-author in the discovery of the frog, named it in honor of his wife Geminis Vargas "for her unconditional support of his studies in Panamanian herpetology." Ponce and biologist Abel Batista described the species in 2014 but specimen were obtained from the source of the Rio Caño in February of 2011. It was distinguished from the aesthetically multifarious Oophagus pumilio through genetic sequencing, the results of which can be viewed by the public through Genbank.

== Conservation status and current threats ==
Limited range, illegitimate pet trading, and loss of natural habitat are the most pertinent threats to the survival of this species. Central Panama, including the Colón Province in which the Geminis' dart frog lives, is classified as a Threatened Amphibian Landscape according to the IUCN. Deforestation has recently impacted this province specifically. Though not extensively researched, this species may be made more vulnerable by the presence of Batrachochytrium dendrobatidis, the fungus causing chytridiomycosis which has been found in some wild individuals. Meanwhile, the captive bred population currently under the care of the Amphibian Rescue and Conservation Project shows promise of growth. The Geminis' dart frog has been classified as critically endangered by the International Union of Conservation (IUCN) as of June 2018. Their home in the Donoso region is at risk of human settlement due to copper mining and agricultural interests as well as migration of the indigenous Comarca Ngöbe Buglé peoples.
