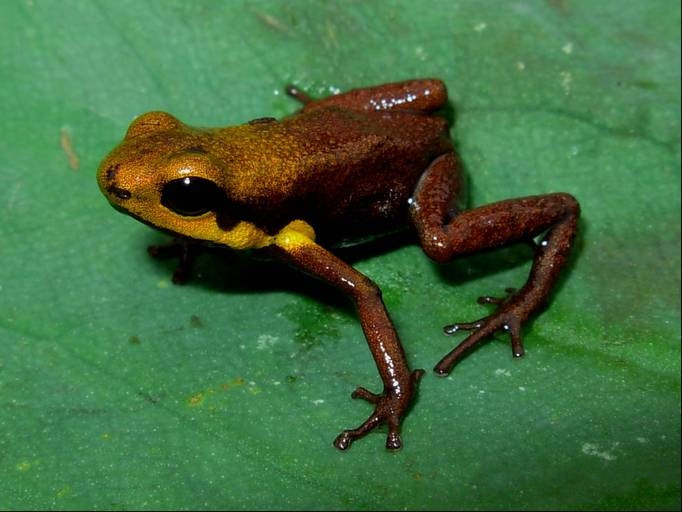

Conservation status
- Vulnerable (IUCN 3.1)

Scientific classification
- Kingdom: Animalia
- Phylum: Chordata
- Class: Amphibia
- Order: Anura
- Family: Dendrobatidae
- Genus: Andinobates
- Species: A. tolimensis

Binomial name
- Andinobates tolimensis (Bernal, M.H., Luna-Mora, V.F., Gallego, O. and Quevedo, A. 2007)

= Andinobates tolimensis =

Species of amphibian

Andinobates tolimensis, the Tolimense poison frog, is a species of amphibian in the family Dendrobatidae, endemic to Colombia in the outskirts of Falan and north of the department of Tolima. Previously it was included in the genus Ranitomeya, but was reclassified in Andinobates, along with 11 other species. It is threatened by habitat loss. It is toxic to humans and when captured will excrete a milky substance.

== Description ==
The adult frog measures 17.39 to 18.91 mm in snout-vent length with considerable sexual dimorphism: males are smaller than females and have detectable vocal slits. The climbing disks on the front feet are larger than those on the hind feet. Its skin is golden or coppery with yellow spots on the upper part of the front legs and sometimes from the junction of these to the lower lip; a black or brown spot goes over the yellow one.

== Habitat ==
Scientists observed this frog in a small patch of secondary cloud forest 1852 meters above sea level. This patch had relatively small trees covered in epiphytes. There was considerable leaf litter, dead wood, moss, and fungus on the ground. The forest canopy was close, leaving little light on the ground, where the frog lives.

This frog shares part of its range with Andinobates dorisswansonae. Scientists distinguish the two through their visibly different color patterns.

The frog's known range is entirely within one small protected park: Ranita Dorada Reserve. Because this park is surrounded by farms, it is unlikely that the frog can migrate elsewhere.

== Behavior ==
Calls occur in a series of short, soft buzzes (each lasting 0.84–0.99 seconds), like cricket sounds and similar to calls made by A. dorisswansonae, but softer. The call is pulsed and has a dominant frequency of 4.73–5.22 kHz as recorded in captivity.

This diurnal frog lives in holes in the root systems of trees.

Scientists saw a male carrying a single tadpoles on his back, demonstrating parental care. He was near bromeliad and heliconia plants at the time.

== Taxonomy ==
It was discovered in 2006 by biologist Oscar Gallego and identified as a different species by herpetologist Juan Manuel Rengifo. The description was made by a team led by experts from the University of Tolima and was published in 2007.

The species name tolimensis refers to the town of Tolima.

== Threats ==
The IUCN classifies this frog as vulnerable to extinction. This may be because of deforestation in favor of farmland, particularly coffee plantations.
