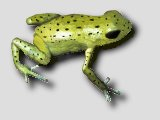

Conservation status
- Data Deficient (IUCN 3.1)
- CITES Appendix II

Scientific classification
- Kingdom: Animalia
- Phylum: Chordata
- Class: Amphibia
- Order: Anura
- Family: Dendrobatidae
- Genus: Andinobates
- Species: A. altobueyensis

Binomial name
- Andinobates altobueyensis (Silverstone, 1975)

Synonyms
- Dendrobates altobueyensis Silverstone, 1975; Ranitomeya altobueyensis (Silverstone, 1975)

= Andinobates altobueyensis =

Species of frog

Andinobates altobueyensis (synonyms ) is a species of frog in the family Dendrobatidae. It is endemic to Alto del Buey mountain in the Serranía del Baudó range, in the Chocó Department of western Colombia. Its common names include Alto de Buey poison frog, golden poison-arrow frog, and golden poison frog.

== Description ==
The holotype, an adult female, measured 17 mm (0.67 in) in snout–vent length. The adult male in the type series measured 15.5 mm (0.61 in) in snout–vent length; the other specimens were juveniles or not measured. These frogs are entirely yellow of various shades (yellow, greenish yellow, or golden); some individuals have small black spots on the dorsum, others also on the venter. The skin of back is slightly granular. The tympanum is round and has its postero-dorsal part concealed. Both fingers and toes lack fringes and webbing.

== Habitat and conservation ==
Its natural habitat is humid pre-montane forest at elevations of 980–1,070 m (3,220–3,510 ft) above sea level. It lives on the ground and in bromeliads. The tadpoles probably live in aroid leaf axils—almost all axils near the summit of Alto del Buey contained a tadpole, but it is not certain that they were this species, as opposed to Andinobates minutus.

This frog has a very restricted range, and there is risk of habitat loss caused by smallholder agricultural activities, logging, and human settlement.
