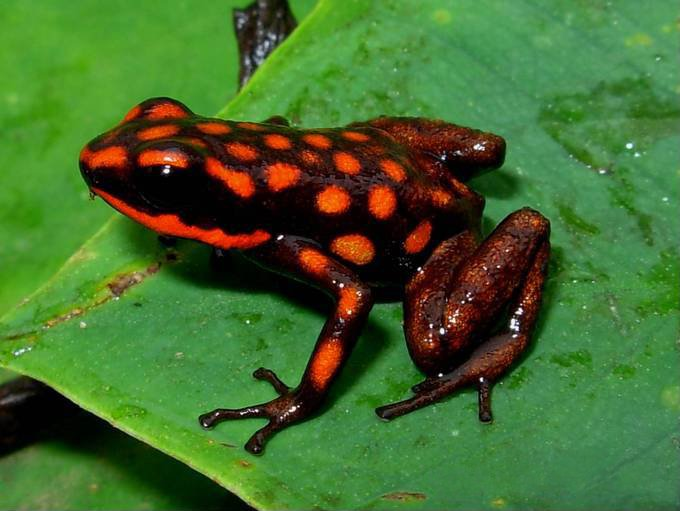

Conservation status
- Vulnerable (IUCN 3.1)

Scientific classification
- Kingdom: Animalia
- Phylum: Chordata
- Class: Amphibia
- Order: Anura
- Family: Dendrobatidae
- Genus: Andinobates
- Species: A. dorisswansonae

Binomial name
- Andinobates dorisswansonae (Rueda, Rada, Sanchéz, Velásquez & Quevedo, 2006)

= Andinobates dorisswansonae =

Species of amphibian

Andinobates dorisswansonae, the dotted poison frog, is a species of amphibian in the family Dendrobatidae, endemic to Colombia in the outskirts of Falan and north of the department of Tolima. It is toxic to humans.

== Description ==
Its skin is bright black or dark brown with red, orange or yellow spots. It is distinguished in addition to other similar dendrobathids because it has the first and second toes fused, a characteristic that it shares only with a nearby species, Andinobates daleswansoni. It has large, prominent eyes with horizontal elliptical pupils and climbing disks on its toes. Males measure between 16.2 and 17.1 mm in length and females between 17.5 and 19.4 mm.

This frog has only four toes on each foot because the first and second toes are partially fused. Almost no other frogs have feet like this.

== Behavior ==
It lives among the leaf litter, in secondary forests with good canopy and presence of bromeliads, where it deposits its tadpoles, which it cares for and carries on the back to a water source. It feeds on insects, especially ants.

== Taxonomy ==
It was discovered by Oscar Javier Gallego Carvajal of the University of Tolima in a fragment of secondary forest of the village of El Llano, in Falan. The description of the species was made together with José Vicente Rueda Almonacid, Marco Rada, Santiago J. Sánchez Pacheco and Alvaro Andrés Velásquez Alvarez, of Conservación Internacional Colombia and was published in Zootaxa in 2006.

== Habitat ==
This frog has been observed in a single patch of secondary forest 1780 meters above sea level. The trees grew densely and shaded most of the area. They grew thickly with epiphytes, moss, lichens, and fungi. This forest sees annual rainfall of 2,500–3,000 mm.

The frog's range is within a protected park, Ranita Dorada Reserve. However, its habitat is surrounded by pastureland.

== Threats ==
It is threatened by habitat loss (logging, farming), hunting, and as a pet/display animal.

This frog lives on the ground among the leaf litter and in bromeliad plants grow. Scientists believe that the tadpoles may develop in water in bromeliad plants.
