= Green poison frog =

Green poison frog is a common name for several frogs and may refer to:

- Andinobates viridis, endemic to Colombia
- Dendrobates auratus, native to central America and northwestern South America, naturalized in Hawaii
