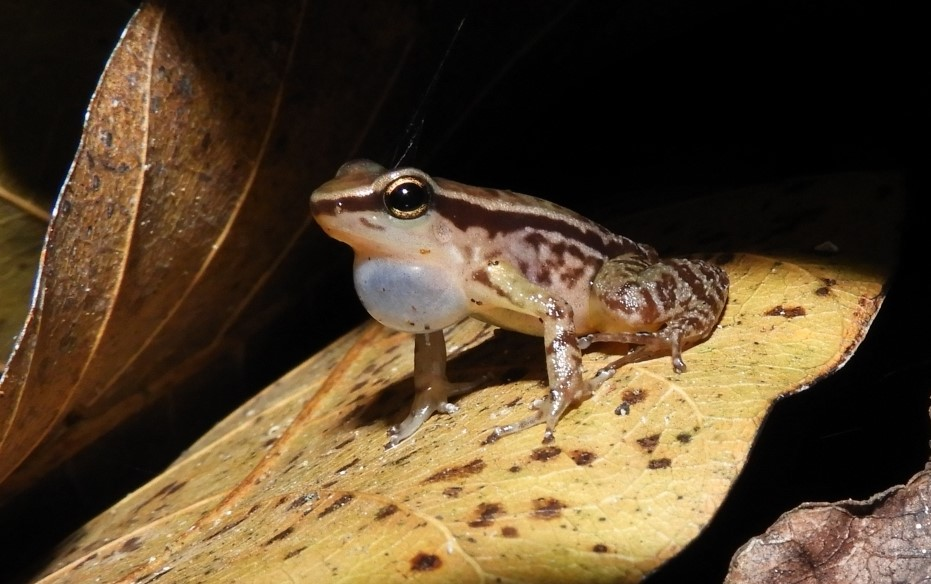

Conservation status
- Near Threatened (IUCN 3.1)

Scientific classification
- Kingdom: Animalia
- Phylum: Chordata
- Class: Amphibia
- Order: Anura
- Family: Dendrobatidae
- Subfamily: Dendrobatinae
- Genus: "Colostethus"
- Species: "C." ruthveni

Binomial name
- "Colostethus" ruthveni Kaplan, 1997

= "Colostethus" ruthveni =

Species of frog

"Colostethus" ruthveni is a species of frog with unresolved relationships within its family Dendrobatidae; it is found only in the mountains of northeastern Magdalena Department in northern Colombia. The specific name ruthveni honors Alexander Grant Ruthven, an American herpetologist.

This frog is endemic to the lower slopes of the north-western portion of the Sierra Nevada de Santa Marta. Its natural habitats are tropical dry forests and cloud forests where it occurs near streams at altitudes above 450 m and up to 2100 m AMSL, and is threatened by habitat loss. Males of this species on average have a snout-vent length of 18.9–20.1 millimetres (0.74–0.79 in) whereas females average about 19.8–24.1 millimetres (0.78–0.95 in).

This species was scientifically described in 1997 and placed in genus Colostethus, which was that time a "wastebasket taxon" uniting various unrelated lineages of non-aposematic drab-coloured dendrobatoid frogs. However, "C." ruthveni is almost certainly not a true Colostethus ("rocket frog") nor a Hyloxalus which contains the bulk of the former "Colostethus", but more closely related to the "typical" bright-colored poison-dart frogs of subfamily Dendrobatinae. It forms a cryptic species complex with slightly different frogs, not scientifically described as of 2019, which are found on the northern/northeastern and the southern slopes of the Santa Marta massif, in La Guajira and Cesar Departments, respectively. Beyond these, its relationships remain elusive as of the 2020s, despite having been studied in some detail. From their reproductive behavior (as far as is known) and the anatomy of their tadpoles, this endemic lineage of Santa Marta frogs seems to be an early branch of dendrobatines, barely more advanced than the very archaic Phyllobates, and might constitute a distinct genus.
