= Andinobates daleswansoni =

Conservation status
- Endangered (IUCN 3.1)

Scientific classification
- Kingdom: Animalia
- Phylum: Chordata
- Class: Amphibia
- Order: Anura
- Family: Dendrobatidae
- Genus: Andinobates
- Species: A. daleswansoni

Binomial name
- Andinobates daleswansoni (Rueda-Almonacid, Rada, Sánchez-Pacheco, Velásquez-Álvarez, and Quevedo-Gil, 2006)

Synonyms
- Dendrobates daleswansoni Rueda-Almonacid, Rada, Sánchez-Pacheco, Velásquez-Álvarez, and Quevedo-Gil, 2006; Ranitomeya daleswansoni (Rueda-Almonacid, Rada, Sánchez-Pacheco, Velásquez-Álvarez, and Quevedo-Gil, 2006)

Species of frog

Andinobates daleswansoni is a species of frog in the family Dendrobatidae. It is endemic to Colombia.

== Description ==
The adult male frog measures 17.83–18.46 mm in snout-vent length and the adult female frog 19.01–19.74 mm. This frog has large, prominent eyes. This frog's tympanum is oval-shaped and partially hidden. There are disks on the toes for climbing, but the disks on the hind feet are smaller than the disks on the forefeet.

The anterior of the frog's head and body is bright red and the rest of the body is brown with markings in darker and lighter shades of brown. Some frogs have yellow-orange dots on the posterior of the body and hind legs. The iris of the eye is black in color.

This frog has only four toes on each foot, which is very unusual for anurans. The first toe and the second toe are partially fused until they resemble a single toe very closely.

== Etymology ==
Scientists named this frog for Dale Swanson of Spokane, Washington, who worked to preserve biodiversity, especially in the Andes.

== Habitat ==
This frog lives in the wettest part of the understory of primary and secondary cloud forests. It requires holes and other places to hide on the forest floor. It can also live in partially logged habitats if there is primary forest nearby. This frog has been observed between 1800 and 2500 meters above sea level.

This frog is sympatric with Andinobates opisthomelas near 1800 meters above sea level. Scientists distinguish the two species by color: A. opisthomelas is red-orange in color with no spots.

== Reproduction ==
The female frog lays eggs on leaf litter. The tadpoles have been seen swimming in water in the leaves of bromeliad plants. People have seen the tadpoles in water all year, so scientists infer that the frogs breed all year.

== Threats ==
The IUCN classifies this frog as endangered. Its range is subject to deforestation in favor of agriculture and cattle grazing.

The frog's range includes one protected park: Selva de Florencia National Park. Most of the frogs believed to be currently living live in this park.
