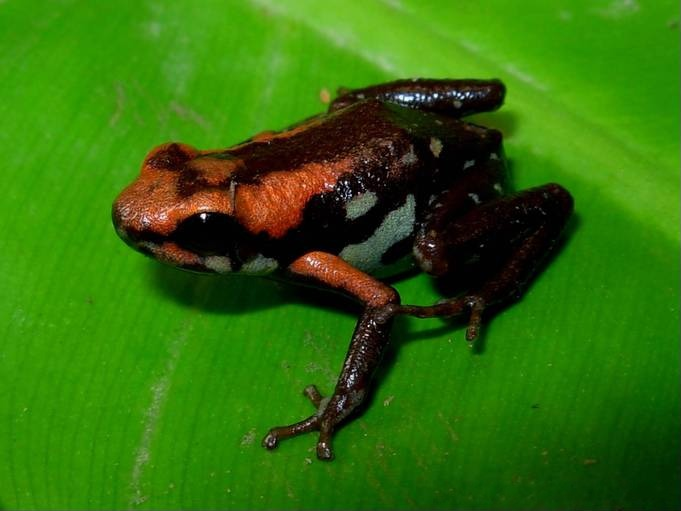
- Andinobates bombetes

Scientific classification
- Kingdom: Animalia
- Phylum: Chordata
- Class: Amphibia
- Order: Anura
- Family: Dendrobatidae
- Subfamily: Dendrobatinae
- Genus: Andinobates; Twomey, Brown, Amézquita, and Mejía-Vargas, 2011

Type species
- Dendrobates bombetes Myers and Daly, 1980

Species
- 16, see text.

= Andinobates =

Genus of amphibians

Andinobates is a genus of poison dart frogs from Ecuador, Colombia and Panama. It contains species formerly classified in the genus Dendrobates and in 2006 transferred to the genus Ranitomeya. In 2011 Twomey, Brown, and their colleagues erected the genus Andinobates for a group of 12 species of Ranitomeya. Andinobates frogs can be distinguished from their sister taxon Ranitomeya anatomically in that their 2nd and 3rd vertebrae are fused. They show no limb reticulation, which is present in most species of Ranitomeya.

== Distribution ==
Andinobates inhabits the rainforests of Ecuador, Colombia, and Panama, whereas Ranitomeya is only found in the Amazonian basin.

== Species ==
Andinobates primarily contained 12 species formerly classified in the genus Ranitomeya. In 2013 Andinobates cassidyhornae, another species from the Andes of Colombia has been described. In 2014 another new species, Andinobates geminisae, was discovered in Panama. This brings the current total to 16 species:

Image	Scientific name	Common name	Distribution
	Andinobates abditus (Myers and Daly, 1976)	Collins' poison frog.	Ecuador
	Andinobates altobueyensis (Silverstone, 1975)	Alto de Buey poison frog, golden poison-arrow frog, and golden poison frog	Chocó Department of western Colombia
	Andinobates bombetes (Myers and Daly, 1980)	Cauca Poison Frog	Colombia.
	Andinobates cassidyhornae (Amézquita et al., 2013)		Colombia
	Andinobates claudiae (Jungfer, Lötters, and Jörgens, 2000)		Panama.
	Andinobates daleswansoni (Rueda-Almonacid, Rada, Sánchez-Pacheco, Velásquez-Álvarez, and Quevedo-Gil, 2006)		Caldas, Colombia
	Andinobates dorisswansonae (Rueda-Almonacid, Rada, Sánchez-Pacheco, Velásquez-Álvarez, and Quevedo-Gil, 2006)		Tolima, Colombia
	Andinobates fulguritus (Silverstone, 1975)	yellow-bellied poison frog, yellow-bellied poison-arrow frog, or yellowbelly poison frog	northwestern Colombia (Chocó Department and the westernmost Antioquia and Risaralda) and east-central Panama
	Andinobates geminisae (Batista et al., 2014)		Panama
	Andinobates minutus (Shreve, 1935)	blue-bellied poison frog or bluebelly poison frog	Colombia and Panama
	Andinobates opisthomelas (Boulenger, 1899)	Andean Poison Frog	Colombia
	Andinobates tolimensis (Bernal-Bautista, Luna-Mora, Gallego, and Quevedo-Gil, 2007)		Tolima, Colombia
	Andinobates viridis (Myers and Daly, 1976)	Green poison frog	Cordillera Occidental, Colombia
	Andinobates virolinensis (Ruiz-Carranza and Ramírez-Pinilla, 1992)	Santander poison frog	Colombia Santander and Cundinamarca departments
