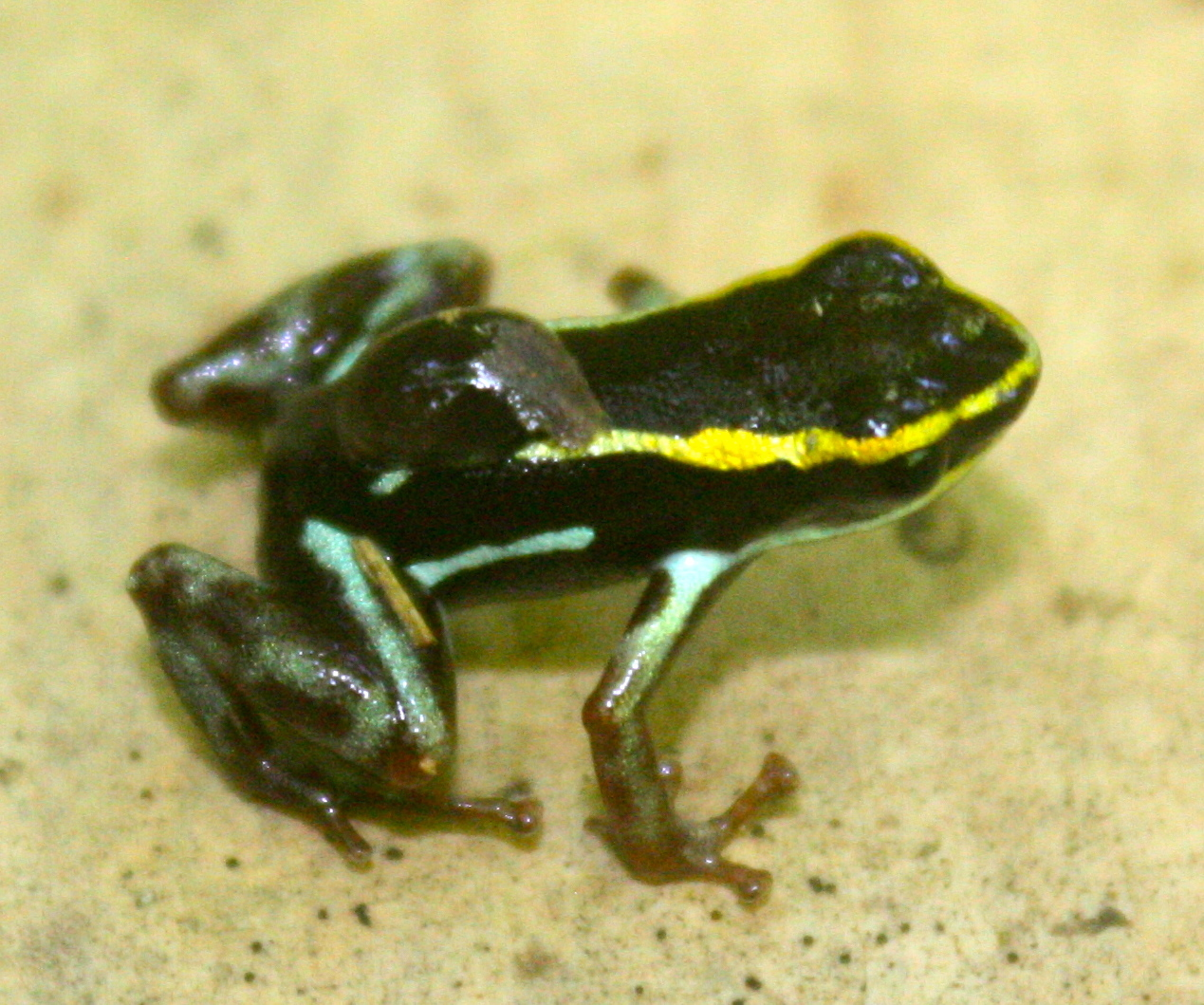

Conservation status
- Endangered (IUCN 3.1)

Scientific classification
- Kingdom: Animalia
- Phylum: Chordata
- Class: Amphibia
- Order: Anura
- Family: Dendrobatidae
- Genus: Andinobates
- Species: A. claudiae

Binomial name
- Andinobates claudiae Jungfer, Lötters & Jörgens, 2000

Synonyms
- Dendrobates claudiae; Ranitomeya claudiae

= Andinobates claudiae =

Species of frog

Andinobates claudiae is a species of frog in the family Dendrobatidae. It is endemic to Panama.

== Habitat and habits ==
This terrestrial frog lives in lowland forests, where it has been observed between 5 and 145 meters above sea level. The female frog lays eggs on the ground. When the eggs hatch, the adult frogs carry the tadpoles to phytotelms for further development.

== Threats ==
The IUCN classifies this frog as endangered. There is considerable deforestation in favor of agriculture, especially on the mainland. Scientists believe this frog is involve din the illegal pet trade but they do not yet know to what extent.

The frog's known range includes one protected park: Bastimentos Island National Park.
