= Excidobates captivus =

Conservation status
- Vulnerable (IUCN 3.1)

Scientific classification
- Kingdom: Animalia
- Phylum: Chordata
- Class: Amphibia
- Order: Anura
- Family: Dendrobatidae
- Genus: Excidobates
- Species: E. captivus

Binomial name
- Excidobates captivus (Myers, 1982)

Synonyms
- Dendrobates captivus Myers, 1982; Adelphobates captivus (Myers, 1982)

Species of amphibian

Excidobates captivus, the Santiago poison frog or Rio Santiago poison frog, is a species of frog in the family Dendrobatidae. It is endemic to northwestern Peru and southern Ecuador. Its natural habitat is tropical moist lowland forests. This frog is black with rows of orange-red spots on its back and yellow spots underneath.

== Description ==
With an adult snout–vent length of 15 to 17 mm (0.6 to 0.7 in), Excidobates captivus is a very small species of poison frog. It is black with orange-red splotches arranged in a row down either side of the back. It also has small yellow spots above the armpit and groin and further pale yellow spots beneath the chin and scattered on the chest and belly and under the thighs. The first finger of the forelimb is considerably shorter than the second finger.

== Distribution ==
Excidobates captivus was first collected in 1929 from the south side of the Marañón River near its confluence with the Santiago River in northwestern Peru, a wet lowland site at an elevation of about 213 m (699 ft). It was rediscovered in the same locality some seventy-seven years later and a single specimen has also been observed on the north side of the Marañón River. It has also been found, at a higher altitude, in the Cordillera del Condor about 20 km (12 mi) northeast of Santa Rosa and also near Panguintza in Zamora-Chinchipe Province in southern Ecuador, at an altitude of about 800 m (2,625 ft). The habitat is wet parts of primary forest and areas close to streams.

== Biology ==
Excidobates captivus is a diurnal, terrestrial frog. In the breeding season, the male advertises his presence by calling from hidden positions among low foliage, emitting short "shrieks" at irregular intervals. The eggs may be laid on the forest floor among leaf litter. The tadpoles are transported on the parent's back to phytotelmata, temporary pools of water, and may be deposited in the axils of Heliconia plants.

== Status ==
Excidobates captivus has been little studied but the remote terrain in which it is found means that its habitat is little disturbed. There is some small-scale gold-mining in the area but it is not known whether this affects the frog, the population of which seems stable. The species is common in certain parts of its range and it is thought that its total extent of occurrence may extend to an area of about 7,350 square kilometres (2,840 sq mi).
