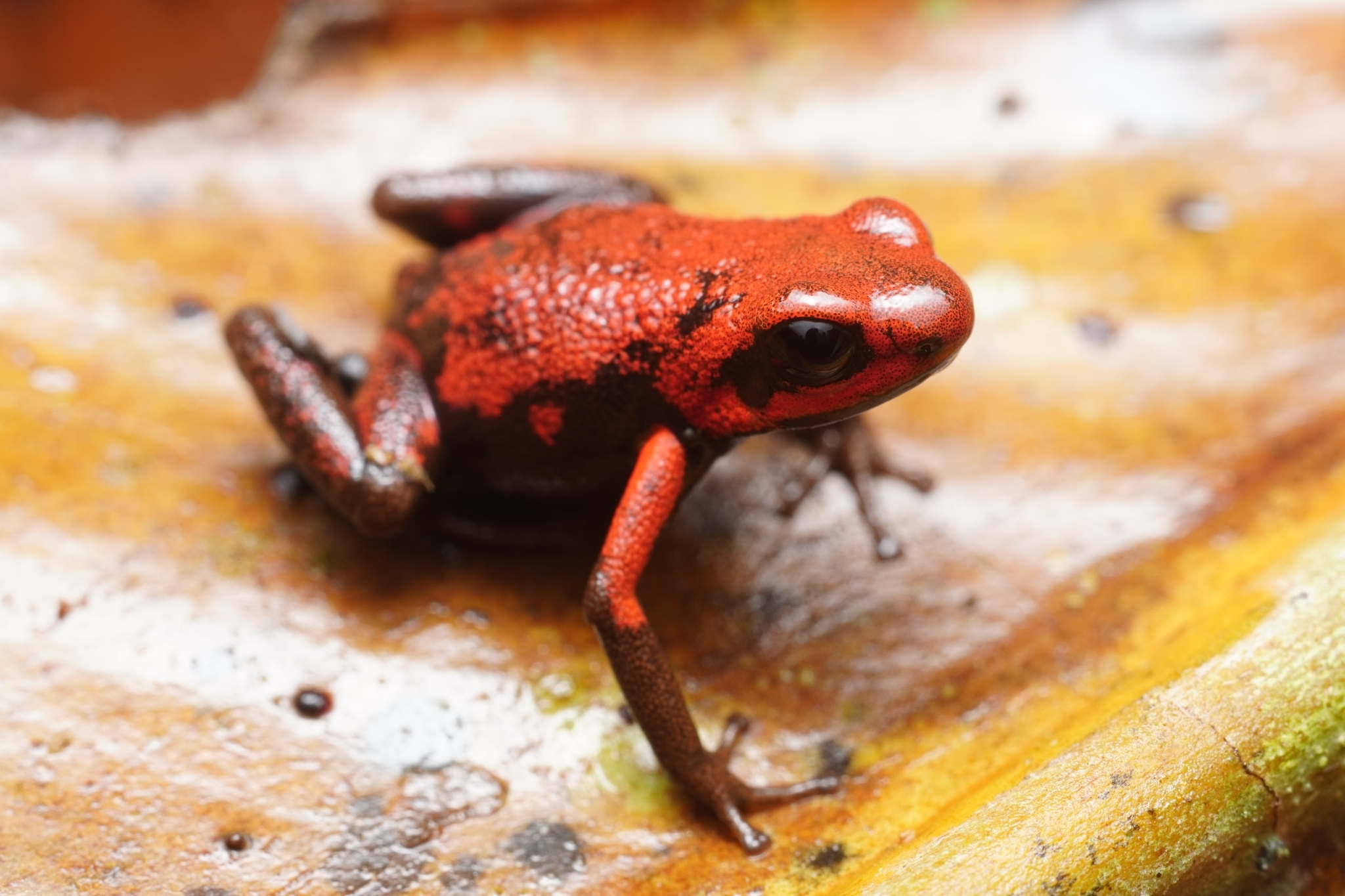

Conservation status
- Vulnerable (IUCN 3.1)

Scientific classification
- Kingdom: Animalia
- Phylum: Chordata
- Class: Amphibia
- Order: Anura
- Family: Dendrobatidae
- Genus: Andinobates
- Species: A. cassidyhornae

Binomial name
- Andinobates cassidyhornae (Amézquita et al., 2013)

= Andinobates cassidyhornae =

Species of amphibian

Andinobates cassidyhornae, commonly known as Cassidy's poison dart frog, is a species of frog in the family Dendrobatidae found in Antioquia, Colombia at an altitude of 1800–2059 m. They have been observed in areas with thick leaf litter and males have been observed calling between 10 and 14 o'clock within these areas. Their call has been described to sound like a "buzz". Little is known about the parental tendencies of A. cassidyhornae, but males are known to carry 1-3 tadpoles on their dorsum, and some tadpoles have been found in water containing husks of Wettinia species.

A. cassidyhornae is named after Cassidy Horn in honor of her passion for poison dart frogs and conservation in Colombia.

A. cassidyhornae females are slightly bigger than a male (a sign of sexual dimorphism). Their mating season likely occurs during the wet season in March–April.

This species is threatened due to disturbance within its preferred habitat and small range and potential smuggling by the illegal pet trade. It was proposed as critically endangered upon discovery, and is currently listed as vulnerable by the IUCN Red List.
