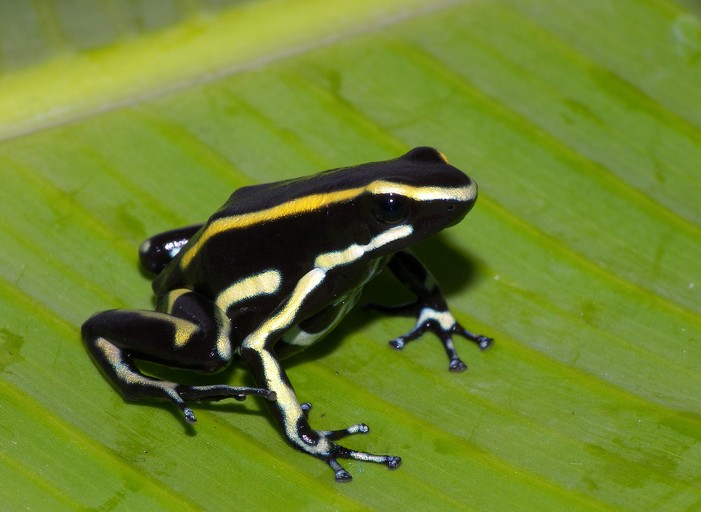

Conservation status
- Least Concern (IUCN 3.1)
- CITES Appendix II (CITES)

Scientific classification
- Kingdom: Animalia
- Phylum: Chordata
- Class: Amphibia
- Order: Anura
- Family: Dendrobatidae
- Genus: Dendrobates
- Species: D. truncatus

Binomial name
- Dendrobates truncatus (Cope, 1861)
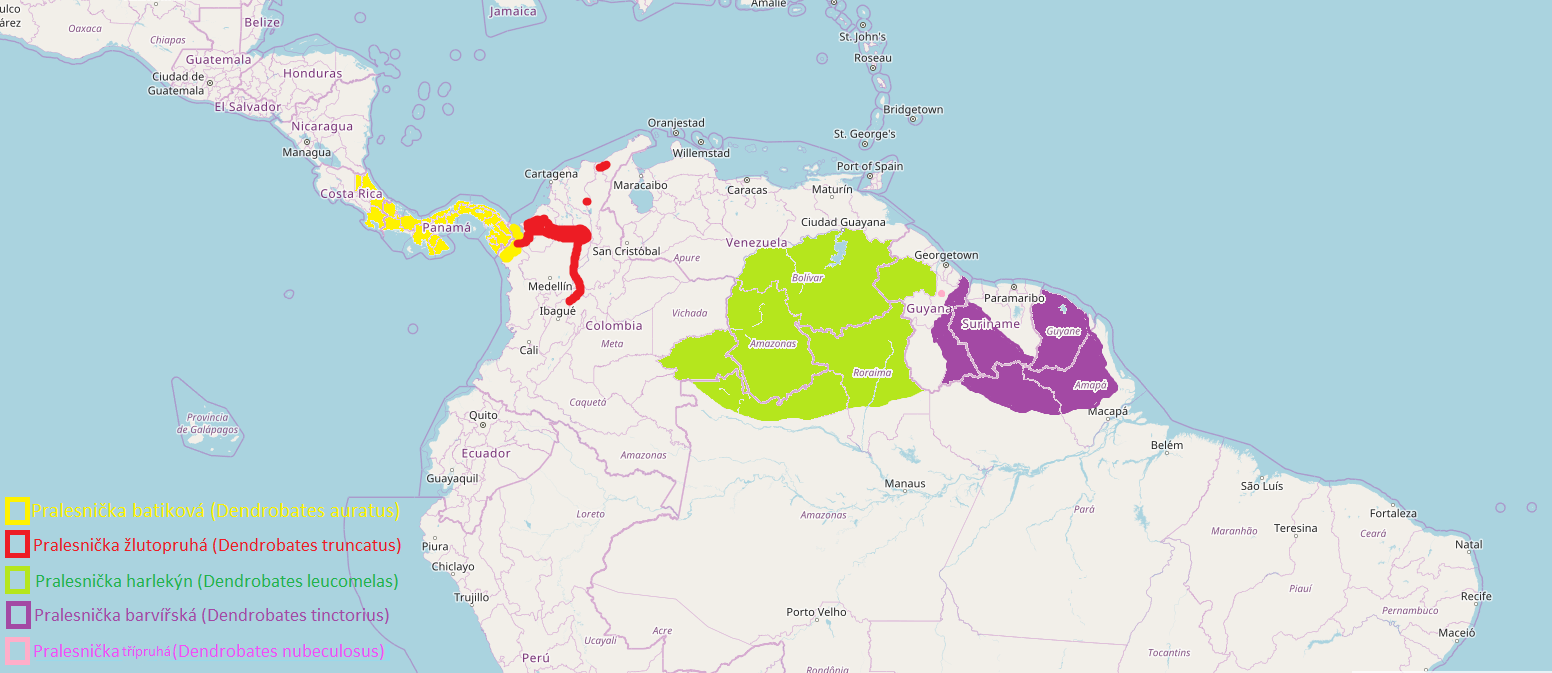
- Distribution of the five Dendrobates species, with D. truncatus in red

= Yellow-striped poison frog =

Species of amphibian

The yellow-striped poison frog (Dendrobates truncatus) is a species of frog in the family Dendrobatidae. It is endemic to Colombia.

== Habitat ==
This diurnal frog lives in wet, humid, and dry tropical forests. It has also been observed in disturbed areas, such as banana plantations but not anywhere that has been completely cleared. This frog has been observed between 100 and 1800 meters above sea level.

== Reproduction ==
The female frog lays her eggs on the ground. When the eggs hatch, the adult frogs carry the tadpoles to pools of still water.

== Threats ==
The IUCN classifies this frog as least concern of extinction. It may once have been threatened by capture for the international pet trade, but it has since gained a CITES listing. If that listing were to be removed, it might become threatened again. Unlike some of its congeners, this frog is difficult to breed in captivity. Sometimes these frogs die when people spray coca farms to kill the plants. The frog is diurnal, and the spraying takes place during the day.
