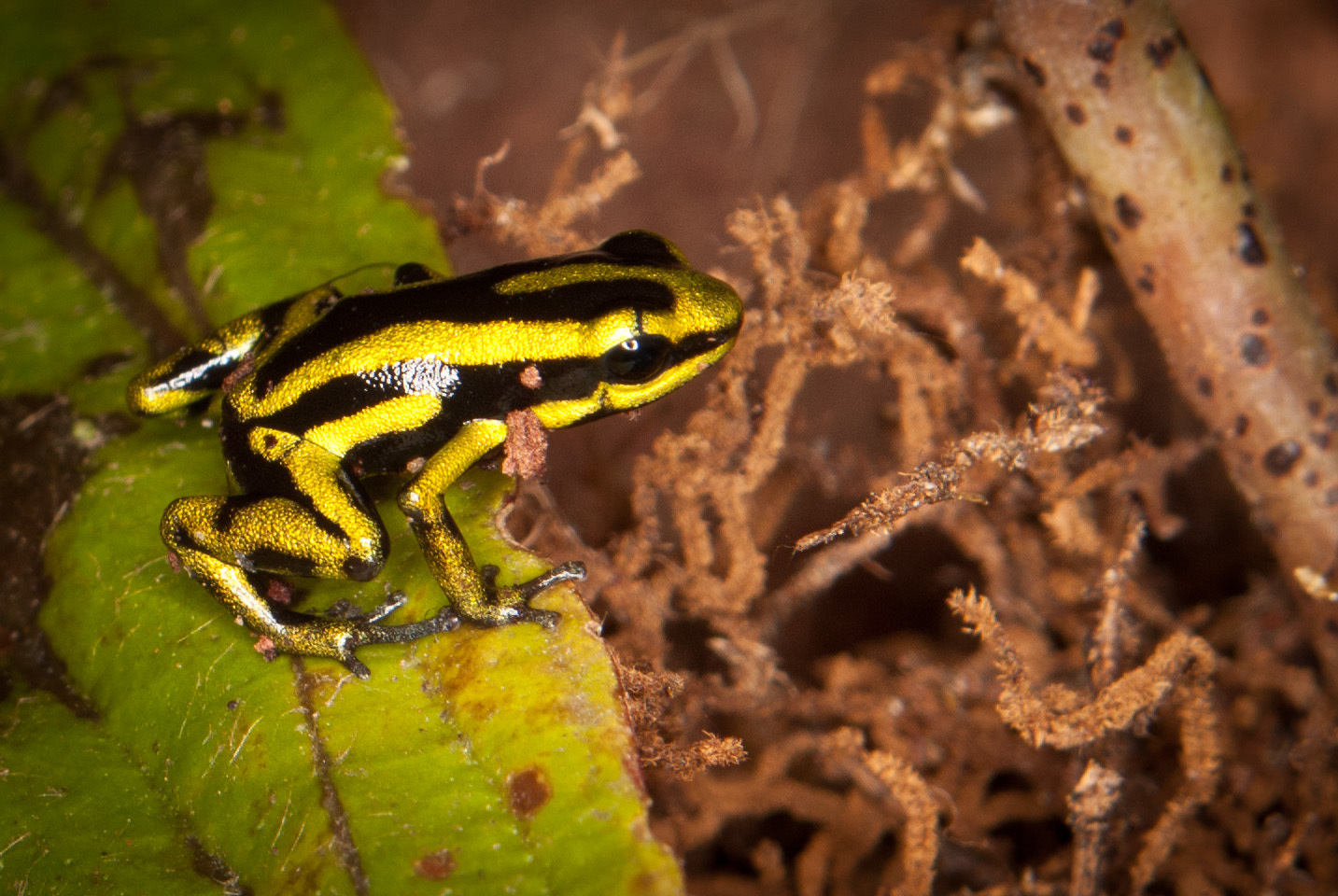

Conservation status
- Least Concern (IUCN 3.1)

Scientific classification
- Kingdom: Animalia
- Phylum: Chordata
- Class: Amphibia
- Order: Anura
- Family: Dendrobatidae
- Genus: Andinobates
- Species: A. fulguritus

Binomial name
- Andinobates fulguritus (Silverstone, 1975)

Synonyms
- Dendrobates fulguritus Silverstone, 1975; Minyobates fulguritus (Silverstone, 1975); Ranitomeya fulgurita (Silverstone, 1975)

= Yellow-bellied poison frog =

Species of amphibian

The yellow-bellied poison frog, yellow-bellied poison-arrow frog, or yellowbelly poison frog (Andinobates fulguritus) is a species of frog in the family Dendrobatidae. It is found in northwestern Colombia (Chocó Department and the westernmost Antioquia and Risaralda) and east-central Panama.

== Description ==
Males measure 13.5–15 mm (0.53–0.59 in) and females 14–16.5 mm (0.55–0.65 in) in snout–vent length. The dorsum is black with gold, yellow, or yellow-green dorso-lateral and lateral stripes (only the former are complete). On the anterior part of the dorsum there is an incomplete median stripe. The venter is gold or yellow and has black marbling or spots. The skin is slightly granular on the dorsum and moderately granular on the venter. The tympanum is round and has its postero-dorsal part concealed. The iris is black. Both fingers and toes lack fringes and webbing.

== Etymology ==
The frog's Latin name, fulguritus, means "struck by lightning."

== Reproduction ==
The male frog identifies a suitable egg deposition site and leads the female frog to it. He deposits his sperm first and she lays her eggs on top of it. The eggs are deposited in leaf-litter. The male frog returns to the eggs periodically. When the eggs hatch, the adult frog takes the tadpoles to leaf axils, usually bromeliads, where they complete their development without further parental care.

== Habitat and conservation ==
Its natural habitats are tropical moist lowland forests. In Columbia its altitudinal range is 160–900 m (520–2,950 ft) above sea level; in Panama it might reach higher. It is a locally common, terrestrial frog.

The IUCN classifies this frog as at least concern of extinction. It is threatened by habitat loss, specifically deforestation in favor of human settlement, logging, and illegal farming, and pollution, specifically the spraying of pesticides and fertilizers on illegal crops. This species seems not to be collected for pet trade.

The frog's range includes protected parks, such as but not limited to Parque Nacional Chagres and Area de Manejo Especial Nusagandi.
