= Excidobates condor =

Conservation status
- Endangered (IUCN 3.1)

Scientific classification
- Kingdom: Animalia
- Phylum: Chordata
- Class: Amphibia
- Order: Anura
- Family: Dendrobatidae
- Genus: Excidobates
- Species: E. condor

Binomial name
- Excidobates condor Almendáriz, Ron, & Brito, 2012

Species of frog

Excidobates condor, the Cóndor poison frog, is a species of frog in the family Dendrobatidae. It is endemic to Ecuador.

== Description ==
The adult male frog measures about 18.5–20.6 mm in snout-vent length and one adult female frog measured 21.6 mm. The skin of the frog's dorsum and ventral areas is black in color. The adult male frog's head is red in color from the upper mouth to the eyes. The female frog's head is uniform black. The front legs are orange-brown in color above the elbow, most intensely at the feet. The bottoms of the front feet are orange in color. The bottoms of the back feet are black in color. The iris of the eye is black in color.

== Etymology ==
Scientists named this frog condor for the area in which it lives: la Cordillera del Condor (Condor Range).

== Habitat ==
This largely arboreal frog lives in montane cloud forests, both primary and secondary. It is found at the bases of trees with bromeliad plants growing nearby, between 1770 and 2130 meters above sea level.

== Young ==
Scientists believe the male frogs carry tadpoles on their backs from their hatching sites to other pools of water where they develop because this is what other frogs in Excidobates do. Scientists have seen the tadpoles swimming in water in bromeliad plants.

== Threats ==
The IUCN classifies this frog as endangered due to habitat loss, especially associated with pit mining, both the mining itself and resulting pollution.

== Original description ==
- Almendariz A; Ron SR; Brito J (2012). "Una especie nueva de rana venenosa de altura del genero Excidobates (Dendrobatoidea: Dendrobatidae) de la Cordillera del Condor". Pap. Avulsos Zool (Sao Paulo). 52: 387–399.
