= Andinobates abditus =

Conservation status
- Critically Endangered (IUCN 3.1)

Scientific classification
- Kingdom: Animalia
- Phylum: Chordata
- Class: Amphibia
- Order: Anura
- Family: Dendrobatidae
- Genus: Andinobates
- Species: A. abditus

Binomial name
- Andinobates abditus (Myers and Daly, 1976)

Synonyms
- Dendrobates abditus Myers and Daly, 1976; Ranitomeya abdita (Myers and Daly, 1976); Andinobates abdita (lapsus)

Species of amphibian

Andinobates abditus is a species of poison dart frog, sometimes known as the Collins' poison frog. It is endemic to Ecuador where it is only known from its type locality, at the eastern base of the Reventador volcano, in the Napo Province.

== Description ==
The adult male frog measures about 16.3–17.3 mm in snout-vent length and the adult female frog about 17.3–17.7 mm. The skin of the dorsum is coffee-colored with orange marks where the front and hind legs meet the body.

== Habitat and reproduction ==
The type locality was characterized by dense, humid forest with many mosses and epiphytes. Scientists observed the frog on a ridge 1700 meters above sea level.

The female frog lays eggs on the ground. After the eggs hatch, the adults carry the tadpoles on their backs to pools of water in bromeliad plants for further development.

== Status and threats ==
The IUCN classifies this frog as critically endangered. Andinobates abditus no longer survives in its type locality, although it is possible that it occurs elsewhere (including the nearby Cayambe Coca Ecological Reserve, but its presence there has not been confirmed). The disappearance from the type locality was due to habitat loss, possibly together Batrachochytrium dendrobatidis infection. Additional threats and possible causes of extinction are conversion of forest to areas for agriculture and cattle rearing, logging, gas and oil extraction, and ash, gas, and pyroclastic material from recent volcanic eruptions.

Scientists conducted a survey in the late 1980s, searching for A. abditus, but they did not find even one. They estimate there are 50 or fewer of these frogs alive now.
