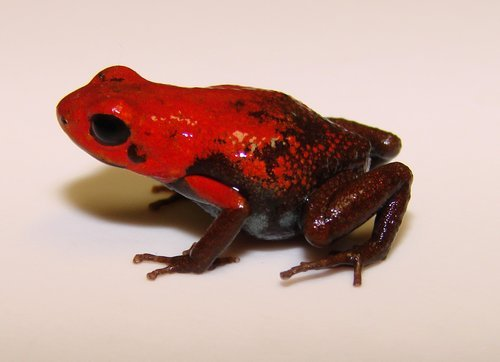

Conservation status
- Vulnerable (IUCN 3.1)

Scientific classification
- Kingdom: Animalia
- Phylum: Chordata
- Class: Amphibia
- Order: Anura
- Family: Dendrobatidae
- Genus: Andinobates
- Species: A. virolinensis

Binomial name
- Andinobates virolinensis (Ruíz-Carranza & Ramírez-Pinilla, 1992)

Synonyms
- Minyobates virolinensis Ruiz-Carranza and Ramírez-Pinilla, 1992; Dendrobates virolinensis (Ruiz-Carranza and Ramírez-Pinilla, 1992); Ranitomeya virolinensis (Ruiz-Carranza and Ramírez-Pinilla, 1992)

= Andinobates virolinensis =

Santander poison frog

Species of amphibian

Andinobates virolinensis (the Santander poison frog) is a species of frog in the family Dendrobatidae. It is endemic to Colombia where it is confined to the Santander and Cundinamarca departments on the Cordillera Oriental.

== Description ==
Andinobates virolinensis are small frogs, measuring up to 19 mm (0.75 in) in snout–vent length. The frog's head and the anterior 2/3 of the body is deep scarlet, which slowly shifts to brown near the vent. The tympanum is brown in color. The upper portions of the front and hind legs are also brown in color.

The tadpoles are red-brown on the dorsum and cream-white underneath.

== Etymology ==
This frog's English name, refers to its type locality: Santander on the Cordillera Occidental.

== Habitat, life cycle, and diet ==
Andinobates virolinensis live on the floor of cloud forests, where it has been observed between 1300 and 2400 meters above sea level. Females lay the eggs in leaf litter, and the males carry the larvae to the bromeliads. Reproduction occurs throughout the year. Scientists have seen multiple adult frogs sharing the same bromeliad, so they infer that the frogs are not territorial. The diet consists of various arthropods, including mites, springtails, ants, and insect larvae. Thus, their diet is broadly similar to other poison dart frogs.

== Conservation ==
Andinobates virolinensis is considered "Vulnerable" by the IUCN because it is found in very few locations and because its habitat is threatened by habitat loss, primarily due to agricultural expansion and logging. However, it is a common species in the zones it does inhabit.

There were some reports of Andinobates virolinensis being traded and sold as a pet, but this appears to have been an error.
