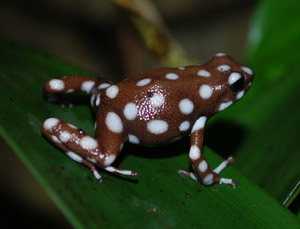
- Excidobates mysteriosus

Scientific classification
- Kingdom: Animalia
- Phylum: Chordata
- Class: Amphibia
- Order: Anura
- Family: Dendrobatidae
- Subfamily: Dendrobatinae
- Genus: Excidobates; Twomey and Brown, 2008

Type species
- Dendrobates mysteriosus Myers, 1982

Species
- 3 species (see text)

= Excidobates =

Genus of amphibians

Excidobates is a genus of poison dart frogs endemic to the Marañón River drainage in Peru and Ecuador, South America. At one time members of this genus were classified as Dendrobates. A characteristic of this genus is the presence of pale, ovoid spots on the under surface of the thighs.

== Species ==
The following species are included in the genus:

Image	Scientific name	Common name	Distribution
	Excidobates captivus (Myers, 1982)	Santiago poison frog	Peru and Ecuador
	Excidobates condor Almendáriz, Ron, and Brito M., 2012	Cóndor poison frog	Ecuador
	Excidobates mysteriosus (Myers, 1982)	Marañón poison frog	Peru
