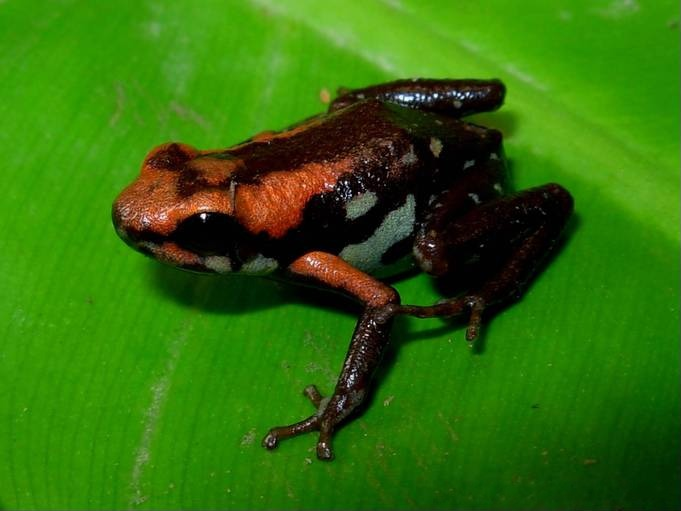

Conservation status
- Vulnerable (IUCN 3.1)

Scientific classification
- Kingdom: Animalia
- Phylum: Chordata
- Class: Amphibia
- Order: Anura
- Family: Dendrobatidae
- Genus: Andinobates
- Species: A. bombetes

Binomial name
- Andinobates bombetes (Myers & Daly, 1980)

= Cauca poison frog =

Species of amphibian

The Cauca poison frog (Andinobates bombetes, synonyms Dendrobates bombetes, Ranitomeya bombetes) is a species of frog in the family Dendrobatidae. It is endemic to Colombia.

== Description ==
The adult male frog measures about 17.76 mm in snout-vent length and the adult female frog about 18.63 mm. The skin of the dorsum is black or dark brown in base color with red or orange marks from the nose to the middle of the body, sometimes to the end of the body, with at least one case of the stripes involving the front legs. There is a blotch of red or orange color on the head. The sides of the body are black in color, even if the rest of the back is brown. There are yellow or yellow-green spots on the sides. The front legs can be red or orange in color but are always the same color as the stripes on the back. The upper lip can be the same color as the stripes or it can be pale green infused with some red. The dorsal surfaces of all four feet can have some blue, green, or yellow color. The toes of all four feet are light brown or gray in color. The ventral surfaces of the feet are dark gray in color. The ventral surfaces of the forelegs are black with lighter marks. The ventral surfaces of the head and trunk can be black with green, yellow, or blue-green marks. The tongue and mouth are dark gray in color. The iris of the eye is a brown so dark that the pupil is difficult to discern.

When compared to other poison frogs the cauca poison frog has a limited homing ability to others who have been previously studied.

== Habitat ==
Its natural habitats are montane and submontane cloud forests between 850 and 2300 meters above sea level. It seems dependent on the microhabitats provided by bromeliad plants that have pools of water in their leaves and near their axils. This frog does appear to tolerate disturbed habitats so long as these bromeliad plants grow there.

== Reproduction ==
The female frog lays eggs in leaf litter. Male frogs have been observed visiting egg clutches and carrying tadpoles on their backs. The tadpoles swim in water in bromeliad plants. The tadpoles are gray-brown in color and part of the tail is clear. The tadpoles have large beaks.

== Threats ==
The IUCN classifies this frog as vulnerable to extinction. It is threatened by habitat loss, especially habitat loss associated with agriculture, cattle grazing, and logging as well as other anthropogenic effects such as wildlife-vehicle collisions. The fertilizers and other chemicals used on farms can also harm this frog.

This frog has been found in the international pet trade.

Additionally, roadway traffic noise has impacted its auditory signals, causing it to adapt through multiple means, including changes in call frequency and timing.
