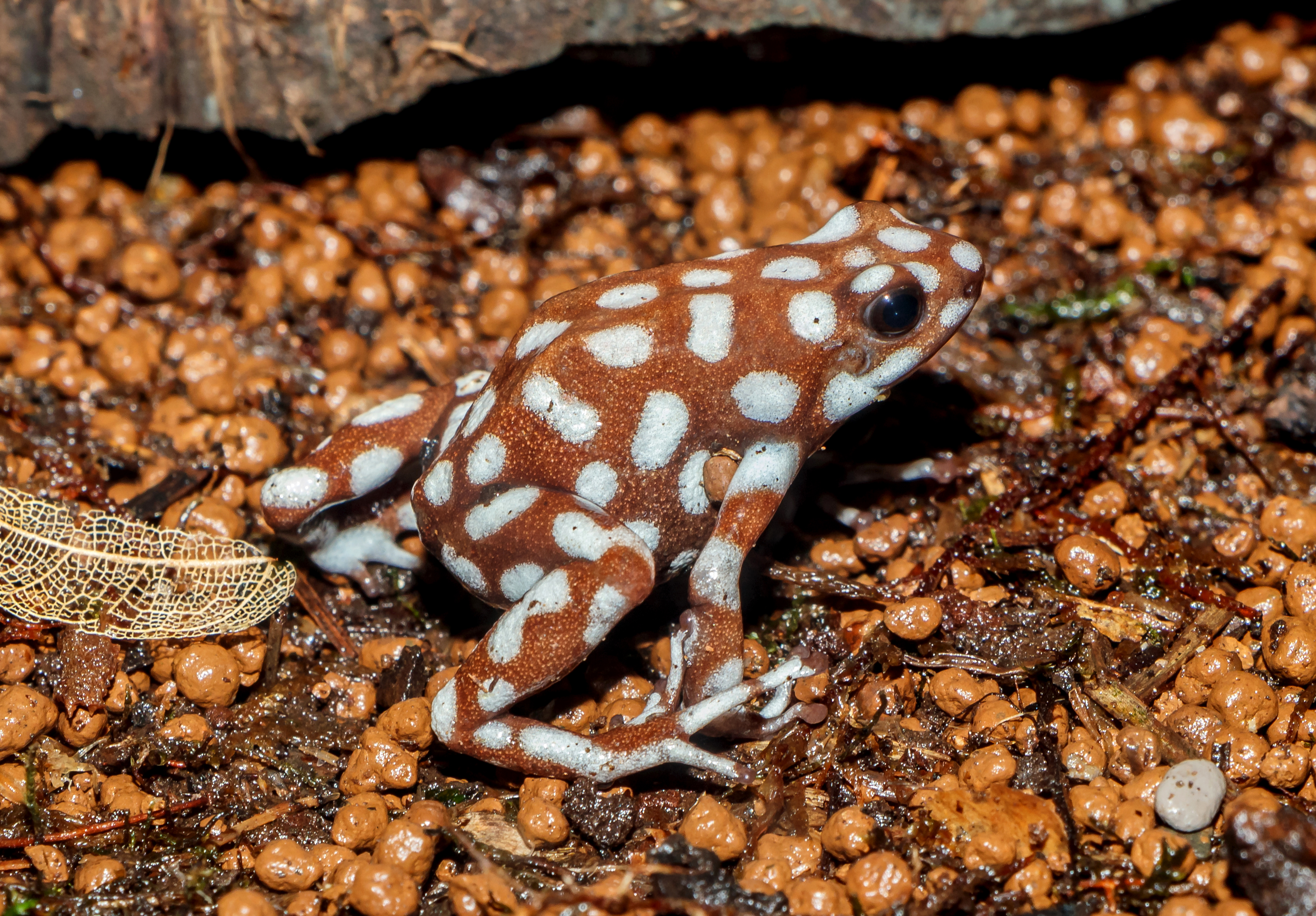

Conservation status
- Endangered (IUCN 3.1)

Scientific classification
- Kingdom: Animalia
- Phylum: Chordata
- Class: Amphibia
- Order: Anura
- Family: Dendrobatidae
- Genus: Excidobates
- Species: E. mysteriosus

Binomial name
- Excidobates mysteriosus (Myers, 1982)
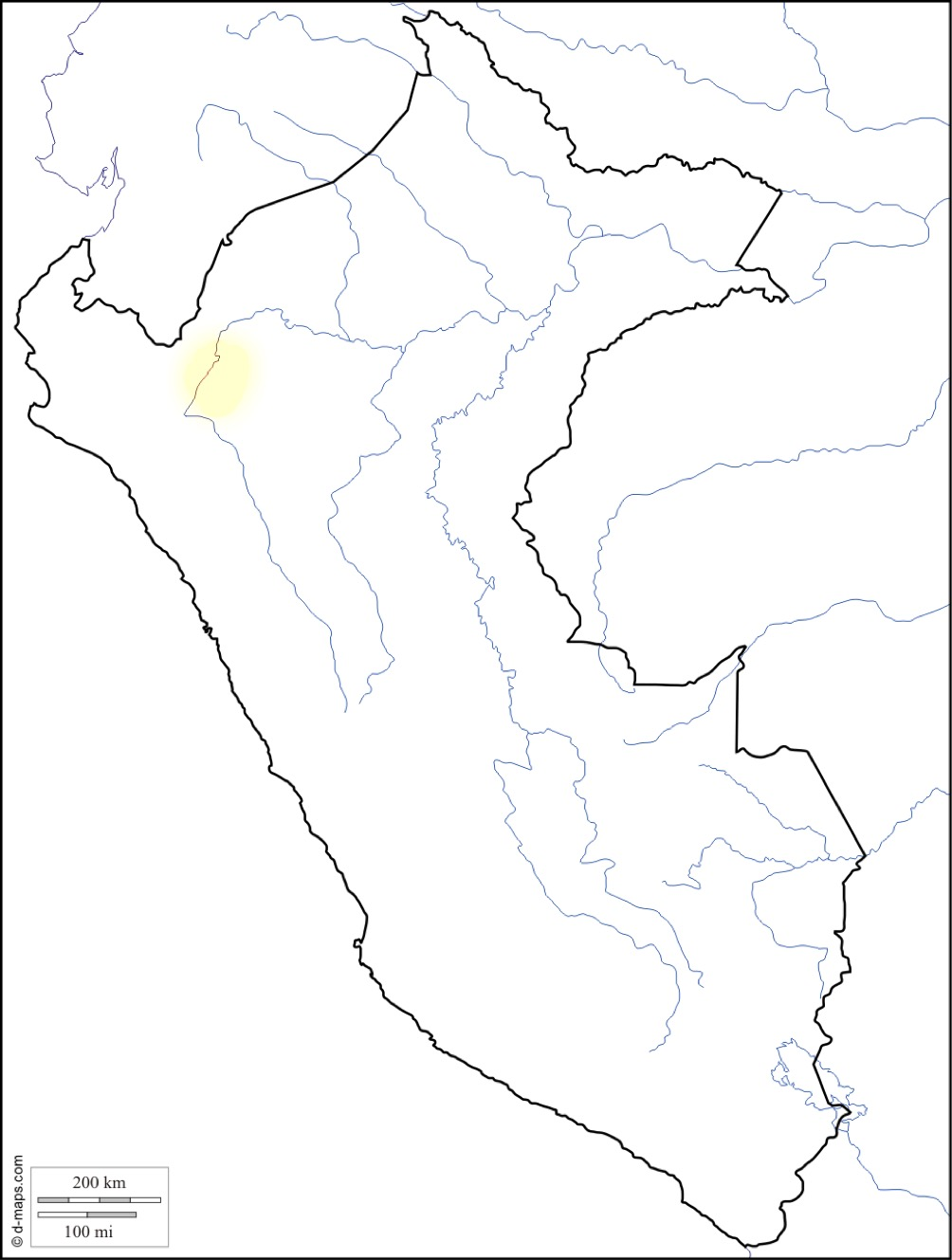
- Distribution of the Maranon Poison Frog

Synonyms
- Dendrobates mysteriosus Myers, 1982; Ranitomeya mysteriosus (Myers, 1982)

= Marañón poison frog =

Species of amphibian

The Marañón poison frog (Excidobates mysteriosus; rana venenosa Marañón in Spanish) is a species of frog of the family Dendrobatidae. It is endemic the Cordillera del Condor, in the upper Marañón River drainage, of Cajamarca Department, Perú.

== Description ==
The adult frog measures about 27–29 mm long in snout-vent length. The skin of the dorsum is black with distinct white polka dots. While the pattern of the dots varies across individuals, there is always a dot under the chin.

== Habitat ==
As per the type locality, its natural habitat is primary premontane forest between 600 and 1305 meters above sea level, especially those with plentiful cacti and terrestrial bromeliads. This frog is largely diurnal and tends to be found near the bottoms and tops of cliffs, where they forage for food among the vegetation. The adult and young frogs have been seen eating ants and short-winged flies.

== Reproduction ==
These frogs breed exclusively in rainwater-filled bromeliads (Bromeliaceae sp). The bromeliads that they need only grow on very old trees, few of which remain. The female frog lays her eggs near the bracht. After they hatch, the male frog carries the tadpoles on his back to pools of water in other parts of the bromeliad. The tadpoles are black in color.

== Threats ==
It is threatened by habitat loss, and is currently listed as endangered by the IUCN. It has also been collected for the international exotic animal trade, which caused its numbers to plummet during the 1990s due to demand for the frog as a terrarium pet. Several vital captive breeding projects are underway in their native regions.
