= Andinobates viridis =

Green poison frog

Conservation status
- Critically endangered, possibly extinct (IUCN 3.1)

Scientific classification
- Kingdom: Animalia
- Phylum: Chordata
- Class: Amphibia
- Order: Anura
- Family: Dendrobatidae
- Genus: Andinobates
- Species: A. viridis

Binomial name
- Andinobates viridis (Myers & Daly, 1976)

Synonyms
- Dendrobates viridis Myers & Daly, 1976; Minyobates viridis (Myers & Daly, 1976); Ranitomeya viridis (Myers & Daly, 1976)

Species of frog

The green poison frog (Andinobates viridis) is a species of frog in the family Dendrobatidae. They are a small green colored frog, approximately 14-16 millimeters in size. Their color is a uniform green with brighter green back and legs, while the ventral side of the frog is metallic. It is endemic to the western slope of the Cordillera Occidental, Colombia.

== Habitat and ecology ==
Its natural habitats are primary lowland and sub-montane forests; it can also been found in good secondary forests. They are found in the forest at a 100 meter to 1300 meter altitude, where bromeliads are located. It is a very rare frog, numbering at fewer than 50, maybe even no individuals. Not seen since 2005, the species was uplisted from "Vulnerable" to "Critically Endangered (Possibly Extinct)" in 2017. It is one of many organisms that uses the bromeliad plant as its host. The water inside the plant is an essential resource for the green poison frog as well as other organisms. These frogs seek particular characteristics in the plant, like the size of the tank and its water quality. However, due to the frog's specificity, they do not utilize random bromeliads, they must have particular features.

== Conservation status and threats ==
The green poison frog is threatened by habitat loss (deforestation), pollution, invasive and other problematic species, and genes and diseases. Similarly to the green poison frog, certain species of the bromeliad plant are becoming extinct, resulting in co-extinction. Small frogs eat drosophila, micro-crickets, small wax maggots, meadow plankton and springtails. This species is not recorded in the international pet trade. As far as movement patterns, it is not a migrant.
