= Minyobates steyermarki =

Conservation status
- Critically Endangered (IUCN 3.1)

Scientific classification
- Kingdom: Animalia
- Phylum: Chordata
- Class: Amphibia
- Order: Anura
- Family: Dendrobatidae
- Genus: Minyobates
- Species: M. steyermarki

Binomial name
- Minyobates steyermarki (Rivero, 1971)

Synonyms
- Dendrobates steyermarki Rivero, 1971

Species of amphibian

Minyobates steyermarki (formerly Dendrobates steyermarki) is a species of frog in the family Dendrobatidae endemic to Cerro Yapacana in southern Venezuela. It is also known by the common names of demonic poison frog, demonic poison-arrow frog, or Yapacana's little red frog. It is monotypic in the genus Minyobates.

Its natural habitat is montane tepui forest where it is common in terrestrial habitats among moss-clad rocks and breeds in bromeliads. Threats to this species include open pit gold mining, collection for the pet trade (and occasionally, for scientific purposes), and possibly wildfires, and the IUCN has assessed it as being "critically endangered".

== Description ==
Minyobates steyermarki is a small frog, growing to a maximum snout-to-vent length of 19.5 mm (0.8 in) but more typically being shorter than 17 mm (0.7 in). The head is broad with a partially truncated snout and an angular ridge between the eye and nostril. The front limbs are long and slender and all the fingers have discs at their tips. The first digit on the hand is longer than the second one, and the third and fourth digits have discs larger than the other two. The toes also have discs but these are smaller than those on the hands. The toes are unwebbed. The skin is finely granulated on the throat and flanks but smooth elsewhere. The dorsal surface is bright red, dull red or reddish-brown and liberally speckled with small black spots. The limbs are a similar colour to the body or may be salmon-pink. The underparts are also similar but have rather larger dark blotches.

== Distribution and habitat ==
Minyobates steyermarki is known only from Cerro Yapacana in Venezuela. This is a tepui or table-top mountain, a raised plateau that rises abruptly from the flat land between the Orinoco and Ventuari Rivers. This has an altitude of up to 1,345 m (4,413 ft) whereas the surrounding rainforest is at 80 metres (260 ft) above sea level. The plateau is entirely in the Yapacana National Park. The area has heavy rainfall and the temperature varies between 13 and 27 °C (55 and 81 °F).

== Behaviour ==
Minyobates steyermarki is a mainly terrestrial species and is found in wooded areas with trees 8 to 10 metres (26 to 33 ft) high, in rocky places where moss abounds. Breeding takes place in the water that collects in leaf axils and in the water-filled rosettes of bromeliads. In captive settings, the females typically lay a clutch consisting of 3 to 9 eggs within sheltered, humid locations or artificial phytotelmata, while the males take on the role of protecting these eggs. Once the eggs hatch, the males transport the tadpoles to water-filled leaf axils found within bromeliads. These tadpoles then spend the remainder of their developmental stage within this safe, water-filled environment.

== Status ==
The International Union for Conservation of Nature has assessed Minyobates steyermarki as being "critically endangered". This is because its total range is under 10 square kilometres (3.9 sq mi) and, although it was said to be very common on the tepui in 1999, its numbers appear to be decreasing. Wildfires could have serious consequences for this species, its forest habitat is threatened by opencast gold mining and specimens have been removed illegally for research.

== Threats ==
Minyobates steyermarki confronts an array of formidable challenges that imperil its habitat and overall well-being.

The habitat of Minyobates steyermarki is under dire threat from illegal gold and diamond mining activities, which began in the mid-1980s and have escalated over the years. This activity involves soil removal, redirection of river flows, and the accumulation of hazardous solid waste, including mercury. Coupled with deforestation, these practices have resulted in significant environmental contamination, erosion, and desertification of the area. This exploitation is further exacerbated by the presence of illegal armed groups that not only control the mines but also the surrounding territories. Satellite imagery has even detected an illegal mine atop Yapacana, underscoring the scale of this threat.

The habitat of Minyobates steyermarki is additionally vulnerable to fires, which have caused significant alterations in the surrounding lowlands and slopes of Cerro Yapacana. These fires pose a risk to the frog's habitat and its capacity to endure in this environment.
