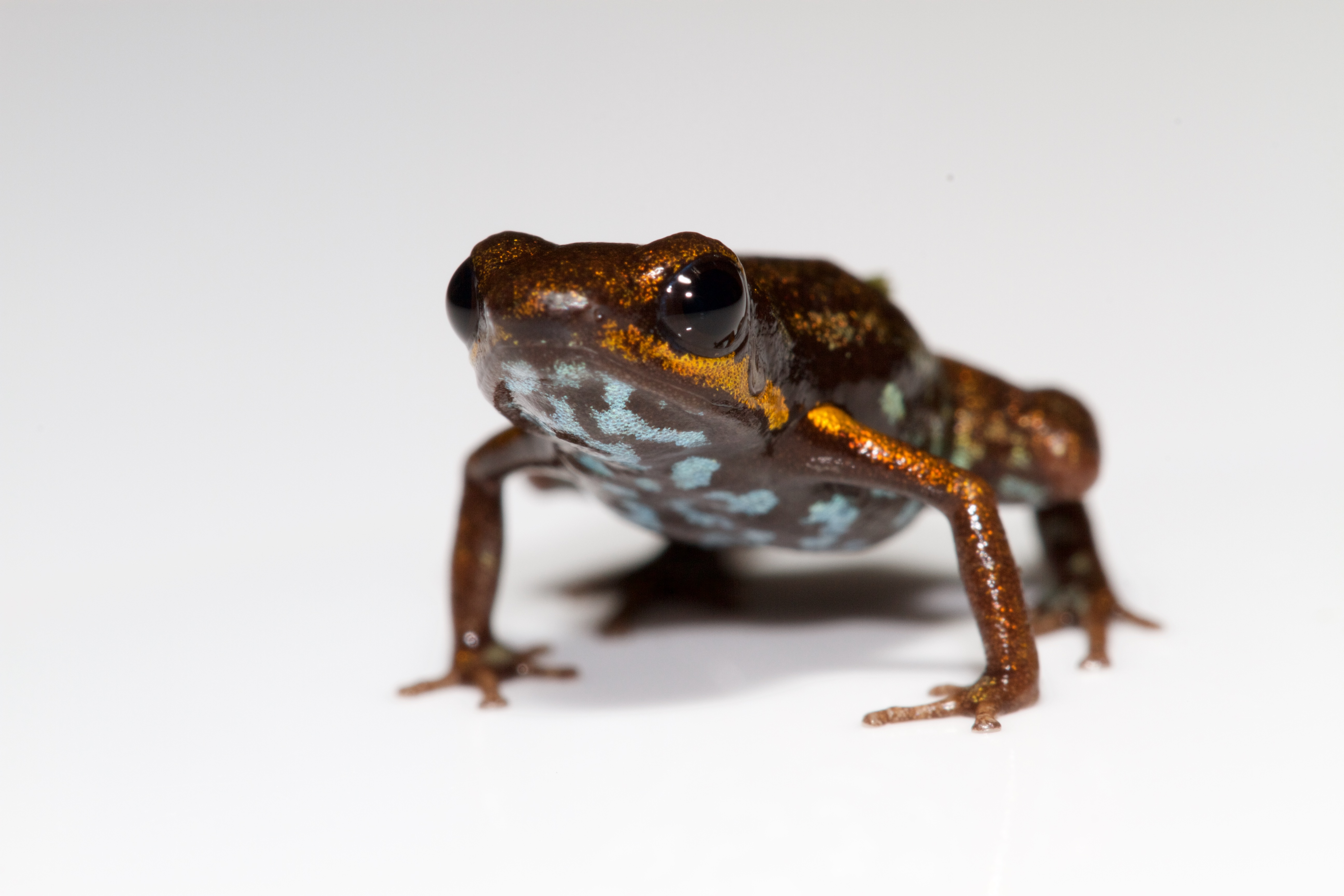

Conservation status
- Least Concern (IUCN 3.1)

Scientific classification
- Kingdom: Animalia
- Phylum: Chordata
- Class: Amphibia
- Order: Anura
- Family: Dendrobatidae
- Genus: Andinobates
- Species: A. minutus

Binomial name
- Andinobates minutus (Shreve, 1935)

Synonyms
- Dendrobates minutus minutus Shreve, 1935; Dendrobates shrevei Dunn, 1940; Ranitomeya minuta (Shreve, 1935); Minyobates minutus(Shreve, 1935)

= Blue-bellied poison frog =

Species of amphibian

The blue-bellied poison frog or bluebelly poison frog (Andinobates minutus) is a species of frog in the family Dendrobatidae.

Dart-poison frogs (Dendrobatidae) form the most diverse group of diurnal frogs in the Neotropics, diminutive animals that possess aposematic coloration and toxic skin secretions.

Taxonomic problems among these frogs are often caused by color polymorphisms which are common within and between species; thus molecular genetics, bioacoustics, ecological and behavioral data have been applied recently to solve many taxonomic problem within the family.

It is found in Colombia and Panama. The range of this species within Panama and Colombia goes from Panama (within El Valle and Cerro Campana, in the central areas of the country and the eastern lowlands and cordilleras), south to Colombia (south to Rio Saija). It occurs below 1,000m, generally even lower. Its natural habitats are tropical moist lowland forests. It is a locally abundant, terrestrial species. As the scientific name suggests, it is a small frog, only 13–16 mm (0.51–0.63 in) in snout–vent length. The eggs are deposited in leaf-litter; the male carries the tadpoles to bromeliads, where they complete their development. It is not found in degraded habitats, but does occur in mature secondary forests.

Andinobates minutus have a specialist diet, with preference for Acari (mites), Formicidae (ants), Collembola (springtails), and Holometabolous larvae.

It is threatened by habitat loss (deforestation) and pollution. Specifically, the major threats for this species are deforestation for agricultural development, illegal crops, logging, human settlement, and pollution resulting from the spraying of illegal crops. This species is not collected for pet trade, unlike many other poison frogs.
