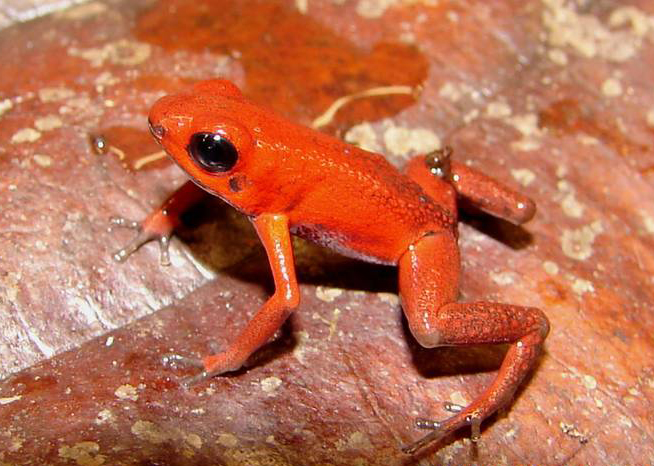

Conservation status
- Vulnerable (IUCN 3.1)

Scientific classification
- Kingdom: Animalia
- Phylum: Chordata
- Class: Amphibia
- Order: Anura
- Family: Dendrobatidae
- Genus: Andinobates
- Species: A. opisthomelas

Binomial name
- Andinobates opisthomelas (Boulenger, 1899)

Synonyms
- Dendrobates opisthomelas Boulenger, 1899; Ranitomeya opisthomelas (Boulenger, 1899)

= Andean poison frog =

Species of amphibian

The Andean poison frog (Andinobates opisthomelas) is a species of frog in the family Dendrobatidae. It is endemic to Colombia.

== Habitat ==
This terrestrial frog has been observed on leaf litter or near the bases of trees in montane wet forests. It can live in a wide range of forest habitats, from mature forest to forest fragments and some types of degraded areas. This frog has been observed between 530 and 2200 meters above sea level.

== Reproduction ==
The female frog lays eggs on leaf litter. When the eggs hatch, the male frog carries the tadpoles on his back to water, such as that in bromeliad plants.

== Threats ==
The IUCN classifies this frog as vulnerable to extinction, largely because of habitat loss in favor of agriculture, animal husbandry, logging, and fires. Fumigation of cropland can also kill this frog. There is considerable illegal capture for the international pet trade.

This frog's range includes protected parks, for example La Forzosa, Bosques de Isagen, and Bosques de EPM.

== Sources ==
- Ramírez Pinilla, M.P., Osorno-Muñoz, M., Rueda, J.V., Amézquita, A. & Ardila-Robayo, M.C. 2004. Ranitomeya opisthomelas. 2006 IUCN Red List of Threatened Species. Downloaded on 21 July 2007.
