= Falan =

Coordinates: 5°08′N 74°57′W

- Municipality and town
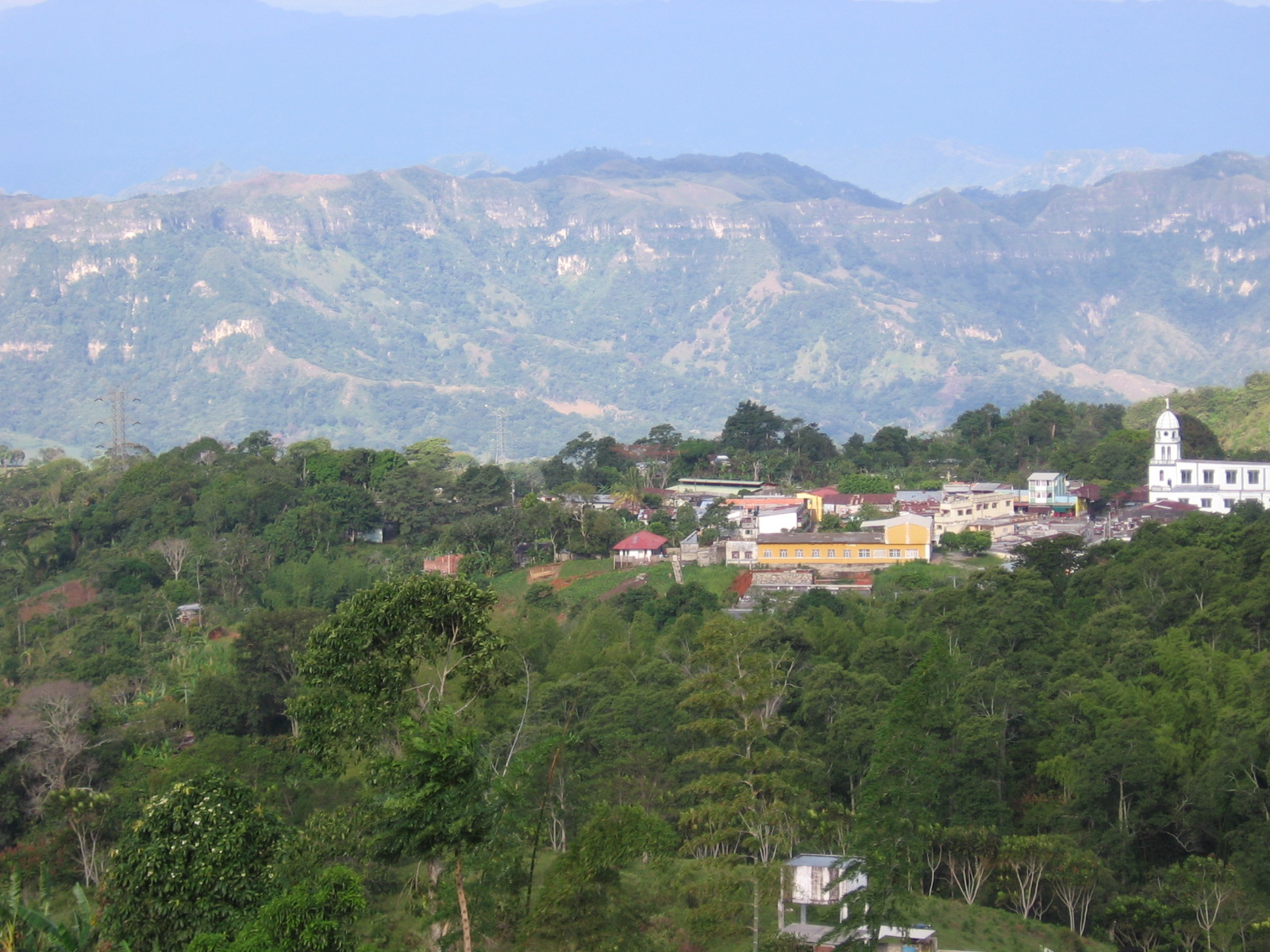
- View of Falan

- Flag

- Location of the municipality and town of Falan in the Tolima Department of Colombia.
- Country: Colombia
- Department: Tolima Department

Government
  - Mayor: Forney Munevar Monsalve

Area
  - Total: 187.5 km^{2} (72.4 sq mi)
- Elevation: 990 m (3,250 ft)

Population (2017)
  - Total: 9,204
- Time zone: UTC-5 (Colombia Standard Time)

Falan is a town and municipality in the Tolima department of Colombia. Falan was founded before 1539, by the Guandecas and Pomponáes tribes. It was discovered by Spanish Baltazar Maldonado in 1539. The population of the municipality was 17,251 as of the 1993 census. The total area of the municipality is 238 km^{2}. Most workers work in agriculture although some do logging or mining. The altitude is 930 meters above sea level.

== History ==
Falan was originally inhabited only by indigenous inhabitants. In the middle of the 16th century, Spanish conquistadors first came across Falan. Spanish settlers came in the mid 18th century, seeking to extract silver and gold from the nearby mines, they called the community Rosario de Lajas. A nearby mine that much ore was brought out of was named Santa Ana, and soon the community began to be called by that name. In 1930, the municipality changed its name once again to Falan, in honor of the poet Diego Fallón Carrión who had been born in the region.

The local economy of Falan, produces coffee, cacao, yucca, maize, panelera cane, banana, and fruits. In addition, wood is harvested throughout the municipality.
