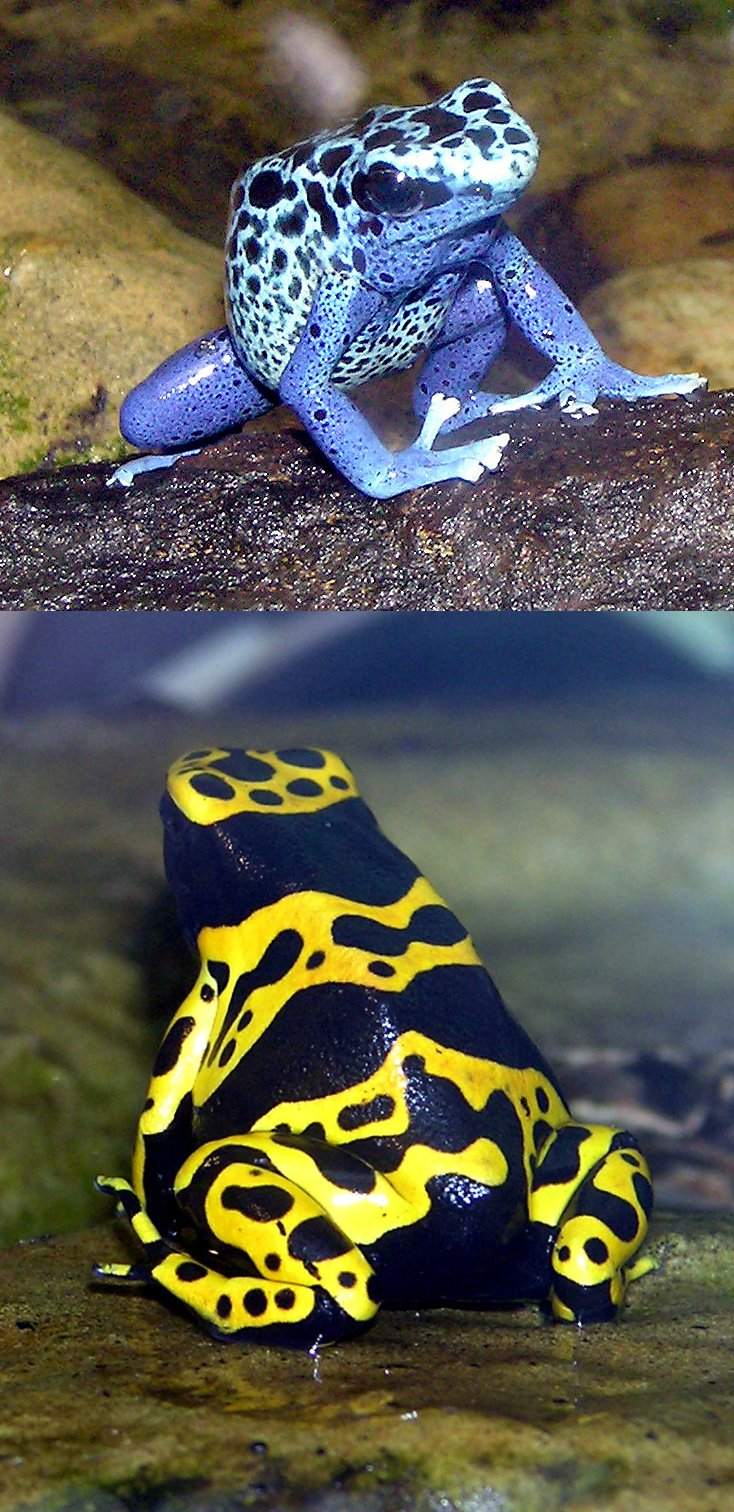
- Dendrobates tinctorius "azureus" (top) and Dendrobates leucomelas (bottom).

Scientific classification
- Kingdom: Animalia
- Phylum: Chordata
- Class: Amphibia
- Order: Anura
- Superfamily: Dendrobatoidea
- Family: Dendrobatidae; Cope, 1865

Subfamilies and genera
- Colostethinae (Cope, 1867); Ameerega; Colostethus; Epipedobates; Leucostethus; Silverstoneia; Dendrobatinae (Cope, 1865); Adelphobates; Andinobates; Dendrobates; Excidobates; Minyobates; Oophaga; Phyllobates; Ranitomeya; incertae sedis; "Colostethus" ruthveni; Hyloxalinae (Grant et al., 2006); Ectopoglossus; Hyloxalus; Paruwrobates; incertae sedis; "Colostethus" poecilonotus
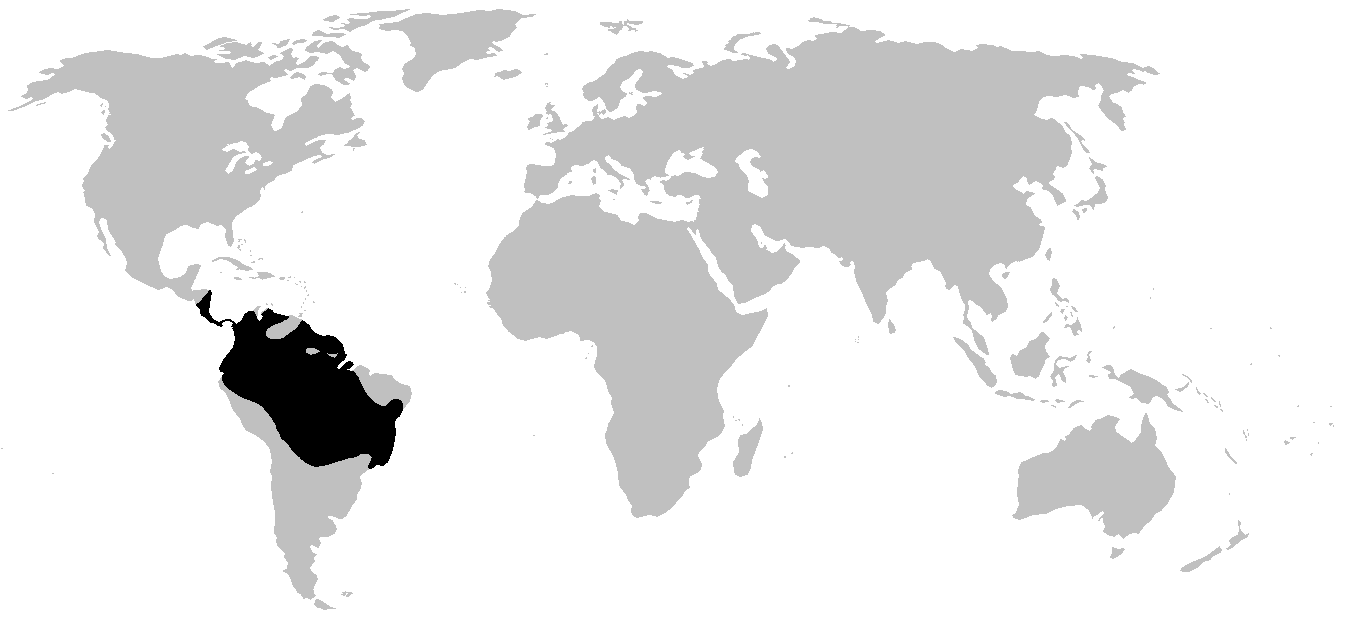
- Distribution of Dendrobatidae (in black)

= Poison dart frog =

Poison dart frogs (Dendrobatidae)

Family of amphibians

The poison dart frog (also known as the dart-poison frog, the poison frog or formerly known as the poison arrow frog) is the common name of a group of frogs in the family Dendrobatidae which are native to tropical Central and South America. These species are diurnal and often have brightly colored bodies. This bright coloration is correlated with the toxicity of the species, making them aposematic. Some species of the family Dendrobatidae exhibit extremely bright coloration along with high toxicity — a feature derived from their diet of ants, mites and termites— while species which eat a much larger variety of prey have cryptic coloration with minimal to no amount of observed toxicity. Many species of this family are threatened due to human infrastructure encroaching on their habitats.

These amphibians are often called "dart frogs" due to the aboriginal South Americans' use of their toxic secretions to poison the tips of blowdarts. However, out of over 170 species, only four have been documented as being used for this purpose (curare plants are more commonly used for aboriginal South American darts) all of which come from the genus Phyllobates, which is characterized by the relatively large size and high levels of toxicity of its members.

== Characteristics ==
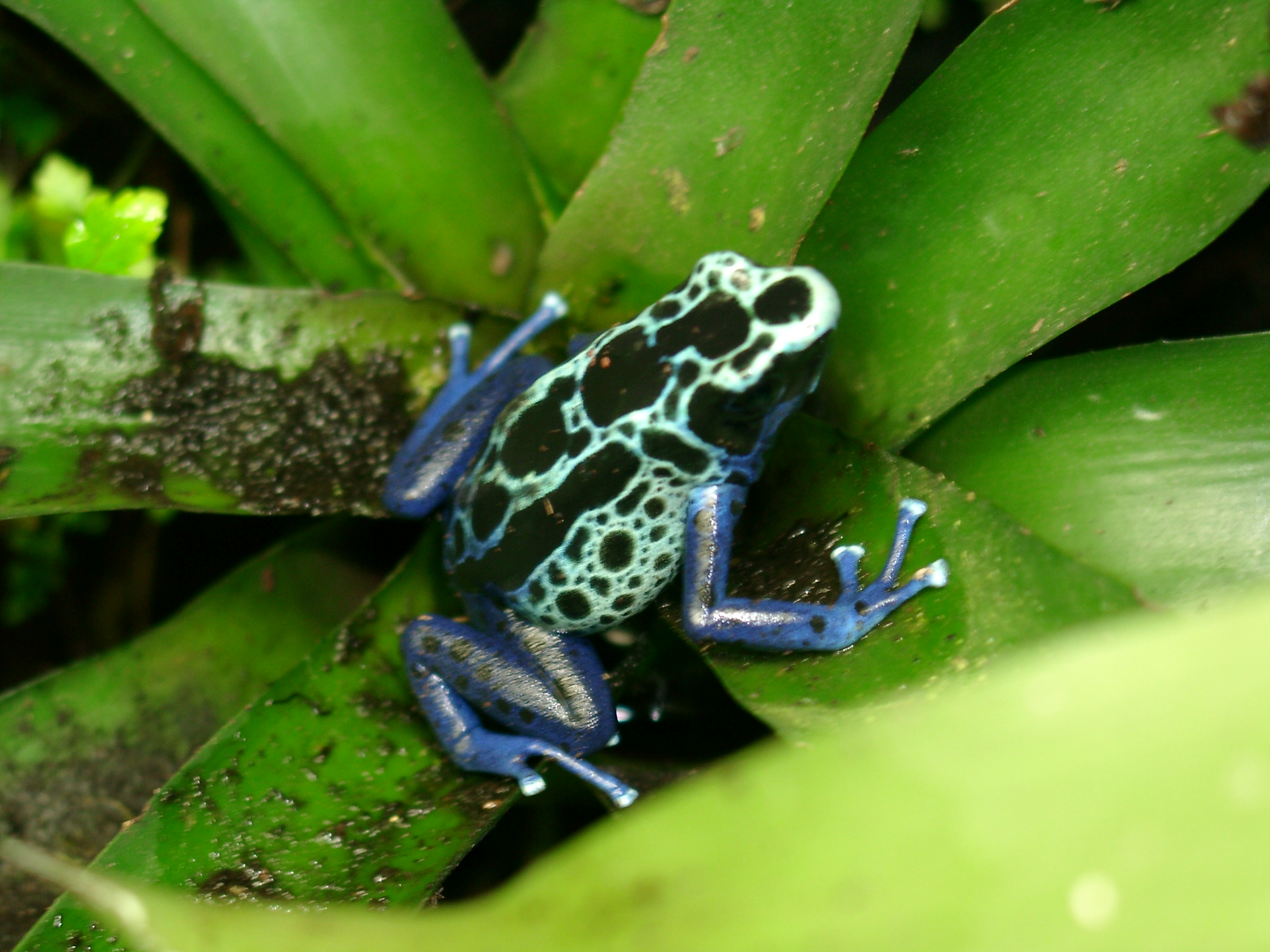
Dyeing poison dart frog (Dendrobates tinctorius)

Most species of poison dart frogs are small, sometimes less than 1.5 cm (0.59 in) in adult length, although a few grow up to 6 cm (2.4 in) in length. They weigh 28 g (0.99 oz) on average. Most poison dart frogs are brightly colored, displaying aposematic patterns to warn potential predators. Their bright coloration is associated with their toxicity and levels of alkaloids. For example, frogs of the genus Dendrobates have high levels of alkaloids, whereas Colostethus species are cryptically colored and are not toxic.

Poison dart frogs are an example of an aposematic organism. Their bright coloration advertises unpalatability to potential predators. Aposematism is currently thought to have originated at least four times within the poison dart family according to phylogenetic trees, and dendrobatid frogs have since undergone dramatic divergences – both interspecific and intraspecific – in their aposematic coloration. This is surprising given the frequency-dependent nature of this type of defense mechanism.

Adult frogs lay their eggs in moist places, including on leaves, in plants, among exposed roots, and elsewhere. Once the eggs hatch, the adult piggybacks the tadpoles, one at a time, to suitable water: either a pool, or the water gathered in the throat of bromeliads or other plants. The tadpoles remain there until they metamorphose, in some species fed by unfertilized eggs laid at regular intervals by the mother.

== Habitat ==
Poison dart frogs are endemic to humid, tropical environments of Central and South America. These frogs are generally found in tropical rainforests, including in Bolivia, Costa Rica, Brazil, Colombia, Ecuador, Venezuela, Suriname, French Guiana, Peru, Panama, Guyana, Nicaragua, and Hawaii (introduced).

Natural habitats include moist, lowland forests (subtropical and tropical), high-altitude shrubland (subtropical and tropical), moist montanes and rivers (subtropical and tropical), freshwater marshes, intermittent freshwater marshes, lakes and swamps. Other species can be found in seasonally wet or flooded lowland grassland, arable land, pastureland, rural gardens, plantations, moist savanna and heavily degraded former forest. Premontane forests and rocky areas have also been known to hold frogs. Dendrobatids tend to live on or close to the ground, but also in trees as much as 10 m (33 ft) from the ground.

== Taxonomy ==
Dart frogs are the focus of major phylogenetic studies, and undergo taxonomic changes frequently. The family Dendrobatidae currently contains 16 genera, with about 200 species.

Genus name and authority	Common name	Species
Adelphobates (Grant, et al., 2006)		3
Andinobates (Twomey, Brown, Amézquita & Mejía-Vargas, 2011)		15
Ameerega (Bauer, 1986)		30
Colostethus (Cope, 1866)	Rocket frogs	15
Dendrobates (Wagler, 1830)	Poison dart frogs	5
Ectopoglossus (Grant, Rada, Anganoy-Criollo, Batista, Dias, Jeckel, Machado, and Rueda-Almonacid, 2017)		7
Epipedobates (Myers, 1987)	Phantasmal poison frogs	8
Excidobates (Twomey and Brown, 2008)		3
Leucostethus Grant, Rada, Anganoy-Criollo, Batista, Dias, Jeckel, Machado, and Rueda-Almonacid, 2017		6
Hyloxalus (Jiménez de la Espada, 1870)		60
Minyobates (Myers, 1987)		1
Oophaga (Bauer, 1994)		12
Paruwrobates (Bauer, 1994)		3
Phyllobates (Duméril and Bibron, 1841)	Golden poison frogs	5
Ranitomeya (Bauer, 1986)	Thumbnail dart frogs	18
Silverstoneia (Grant, et al., 2006)		8

=== Color morphs ===
Some poison dart frogs species include a number of conspecific color morphs that emerged as recently as 6,000 years ago. Therefore, species such as Dendrobates tinctorius, Oophaga pumilio, and Oophaga granulifera can include color pattern morphs that can be interbred (colors are under polygenic control, while the actual patterns are probably controlled by a single locus). Differing coloration has historically misidentified single species as separate, and there is still controversy among taxonomists over classification.

Variation in predation regimens may have influenced the evolution of polymorphism in Oophaga granulifera, while sexual selection appears to have contributed to differentiation among the Bocas del Toro populations of Oophaga pumilio.

== Toxicity and medicine ==
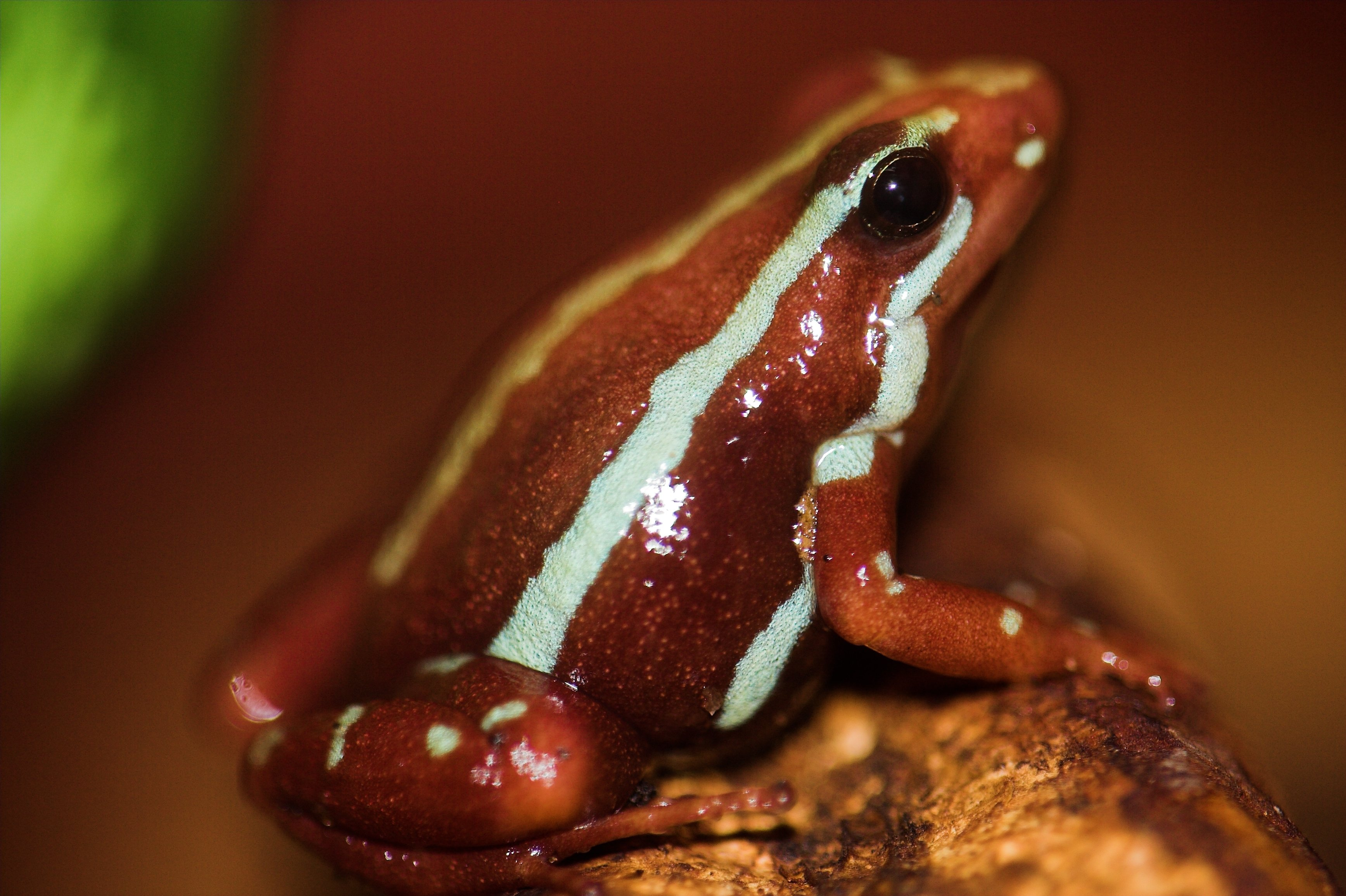
The skin of the phantasmal poison frog contains epibatidine

The chemical defense mechanisms of the Dendrobates family are the result of exogenous means. Essentially, this means that their ability to defend has come through the consumption of a particular diet – in this case, toxic arthropods – from which they absorb and reuse the consumed toxins. The secretion of these chemicals is released by the granular glands of the frog. The chemicals secreted by the Dendrobatid family of frogs are alkaloids that differ in chemical structure and toxicity.

Many poison dart frogs secrete lipophilic alkaloid toxins such as allopumiliotoxin 267A, batrachotoxin, epibatidine, histrionicotoxin, and pumiliotoxin 251D through their skin. Alkaloids in the skin glands of poison dart frogs serve as a chemical defense against predation, and they are therefore able to be active alongside potential predators during the day. About 28 structural classes of alkaloids are known in poison dart frogs. The most toxic of poison dart frog species is Phyllobates terribilis. It is believed that dart frogs do not synthesize their poisons, but sequester the chemicals from arthropod prey items, such as ants, centipedes and mites – the diet-toxicity hypothesis. Because of this, captive-bred animals do not possess significant levels of toxins as they are reared on diets that do not contain the alkaloids sequestered by wild populations. Nonetheless, the captive-bred frogs retain the ability to accumulate alkaloids when they are once again provided an alkaloidal diet. Despite the toxins used by some poison dart frogs, some predators have developed the ability to withstand them. One is the snake Erythrolamprus epinephalus, which has developed immunity to the poison.

Chemicals extracted from the skin of Epipedobates tricolor may have medicinal value. Scientists use this poison to make a painkiller. One such chemical is a painkiller 200 times as potent as morphine, called epibatidine; however, the therapeutic dose is very close to the fatal dose. A derivative, ABT-594, developed by Abbott Laboratories, was named as Tebanicline and got as far as Phase II trials in humans, but was dropped from further development due to dangerous gastrointestinal side effects. Secretions from dendrobatids are also showing promise as muscle relaxants, heart stimulants and appetite suppressants. The most poisonous of these frogs, the golden poison frog (Phyllobates terribilis), has enough toxin on average to kill ten to twenty men or about twenty thousand mice. Most other dendrobatids, while colorful and toxic enough to discourage predation, pose far less risk to humans or other large animals.

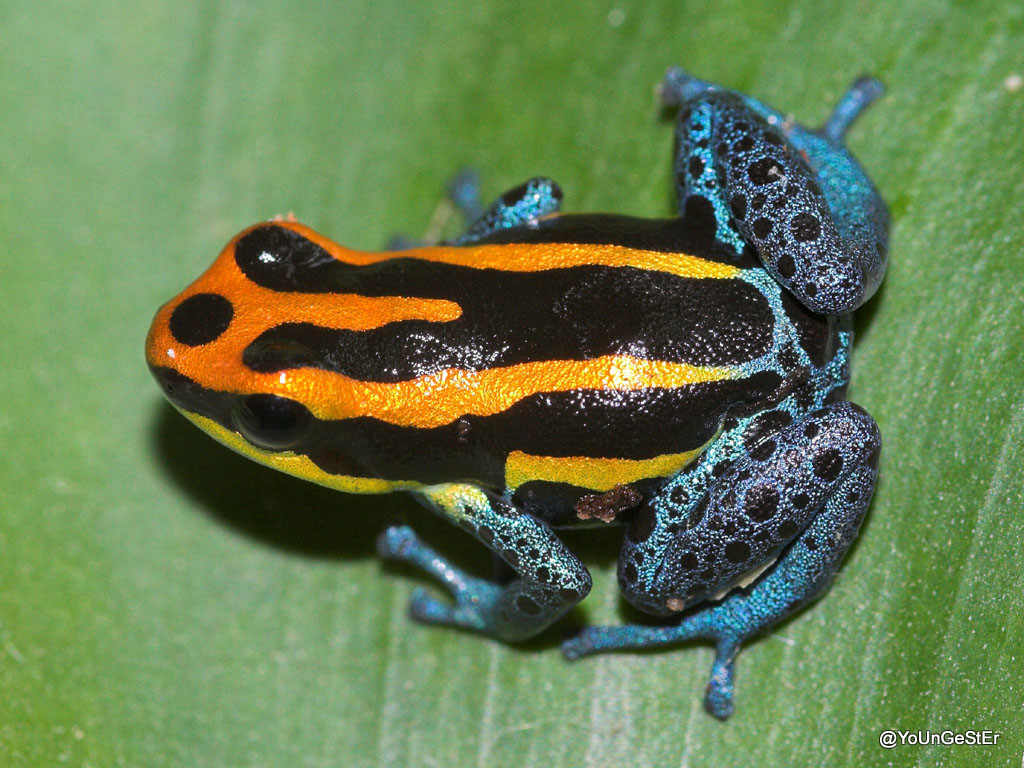
Ranitomeya amazonica

=== Conspicuousness ===
Conspicuous coloration in these frogs is further associated with diet specialization, body mass, aerobic capacity, and chemical defense. Conspicuousness and toxicity may be inversely related, as polymorphic poison dart frogs that are less conspicuous are more toxic than the brightest and most conspicuous species. Energetic costs of producing toxins and bright color pigments lead to potential trade-offs between toxicity and bright coloration, and prey with strong secondary defenses have less to gain from costly signaling. Therefore, prey populations that are more toxic are predicted to manifest less bright signals, opposing the classical view that increased conspicuousness always evolves with increased toxicity.

=== Aposematism ===
Skin toxicity evolved alongside bright coloration, perhaps preceding it. Toxicity may have relied on a shift in diet to alkaloid-rich arthropods, which likely occurred at least four times among the dendrobatids. Either aposematism and aerobic capacity preceded greater resource gathering, making it easier for frogs to go out and gather the ants and mites required for diet specialization, contrary to classical aposematic theory, which assumes that toxicity from diet arises before signaling. Alternatively, diet specialization preceded higher aerobic capacity, and aposematism evolved to allow dendrobatids to gather resources without predation. Prey mobility could also explain the initial development of aposematic signaling. If prey have characteristics that make them more exposed to predators, such as when some dendrobatids shifted from nocturnal to diurnal behavior, then they have more reason to develop aposematism. After the switch, the frogs had greater ecological opportunities, causing dietary specialization to arise. Thus, aposematism is not merely a signaling system, but a way for organisms to gain greater access to resources and increase their reproductive success.

=== Other factors ===
Dietary conservatism (long-term neophobia) in predators could facilitate the evolution of warning coloration, if predators avoid novel morphs for a long enough period of time. Another possibility is genetic drift, the so-called gradual-change hypothesis, which could strengthen weak pre-existing aposematism.

Sexual selection may have played a role in the diversification of skin color and pattern in poison frogs. With female preferences in play, male coloration could evolve rapidly. Sexual selection is influenced by many things. The parental investment may shed some light on the evolution of coloration in relation to female choice. In Oophaga pumilio, the female provides care for the offspring for several weeks whereas the males provides care for a few days, implying a strong female preference. Sexual selection increases phenotypic variation drastically. In populations of O. pumilio that participated in sexual selection, the phenotypic polymorphism was evident. The lack of sexual dimorphism in some dendrobatid populations however suggests that sexual selection is not a valid explanation.

Functional trade-offs are seen in poison frog defense mechanisms relating to toxin resistance. Poison dart frogs containing epibatidine have undergone a 3 amino acid mutation on receptors of the body, allowing the frog to be resistant to its own poison. Epibatidine-producing frogs have evolved poison resistance of body receptors independently three times. This target-site insensitivity to the potent toxin epibatidine on nicotinic acetylcholine receptors provides a toxin resistance while reducing the affinity of acetylcholine binding.

== Diet ==
The diet of Dendrobatidae is what gives them the alkaloids/toxins that are found in their skin. The diet that is responsible for these characteristics consists primarily of small and leaf-litter arthropods found in its general habitat, typically ants. Their diet, however, is typically separated into two distinct categories. The first is the primary portion of Dendrobatidae's diet which include prey that are slow-moving, large in number, and small in size. This typically consists of ants, while also including mites, small beetles, and minor litter-dwelling taxa. The second category of prey are much rarer finds and are much larger in body size, and they tend to have high palatability and mobility. These typically consist of the orthopteroids, lepidopteran larvae, and spiders. The natural diet of an individual dendrobatid depends on its species and prey abundance in its location, amongst other factors.

== Behavior ==
=== Aggressive behavior and territoriality ===
Both male and female Dendrobatidae are territorial and display aggressive behavior, both as tadpoles and adults. Dendrobatidae are especially aggressive in defending regions that serve as male calling sites. Males wrestle with intruders of their territory in order to defend their calling sites as well as their vegetation. While vocalization and various behavioral displays serve as a way of exhibiting one's strength or fitness, territorial disputes and fights often escalate to physical combat and aggression. Physical violence and aggression are particularly common at times of calling. If it an intruder is detected making calls in the territory of a Dendrobatidae frog, the resident frog attempts to eliminate the competition to claim the territory and the females in it for himself. The resident frog initially makes its presence known by the means of vocalization and various behavioral displays as a way to exert dominance, but if this does not scare away the intruder, then the resident frog moves towards the intruder and strikes them. These encounters immediately escalate into a full on fight where both strike each other and grasp each other's limbs. Similarly, the females also often get into fights and display aggressive behaviors in disputes over territory or a mating conflict. It has also been observed that females who are going after the same male, after hearing their call, chase each other down and wrestle to fight for the male. After a female courts with a male, they are also very likely to exhibit aggressive behavior towards any females that approach that male. Both the males and females bout their own respective sexes for each other in a fairly similar fashion.

=== Reproduction ===
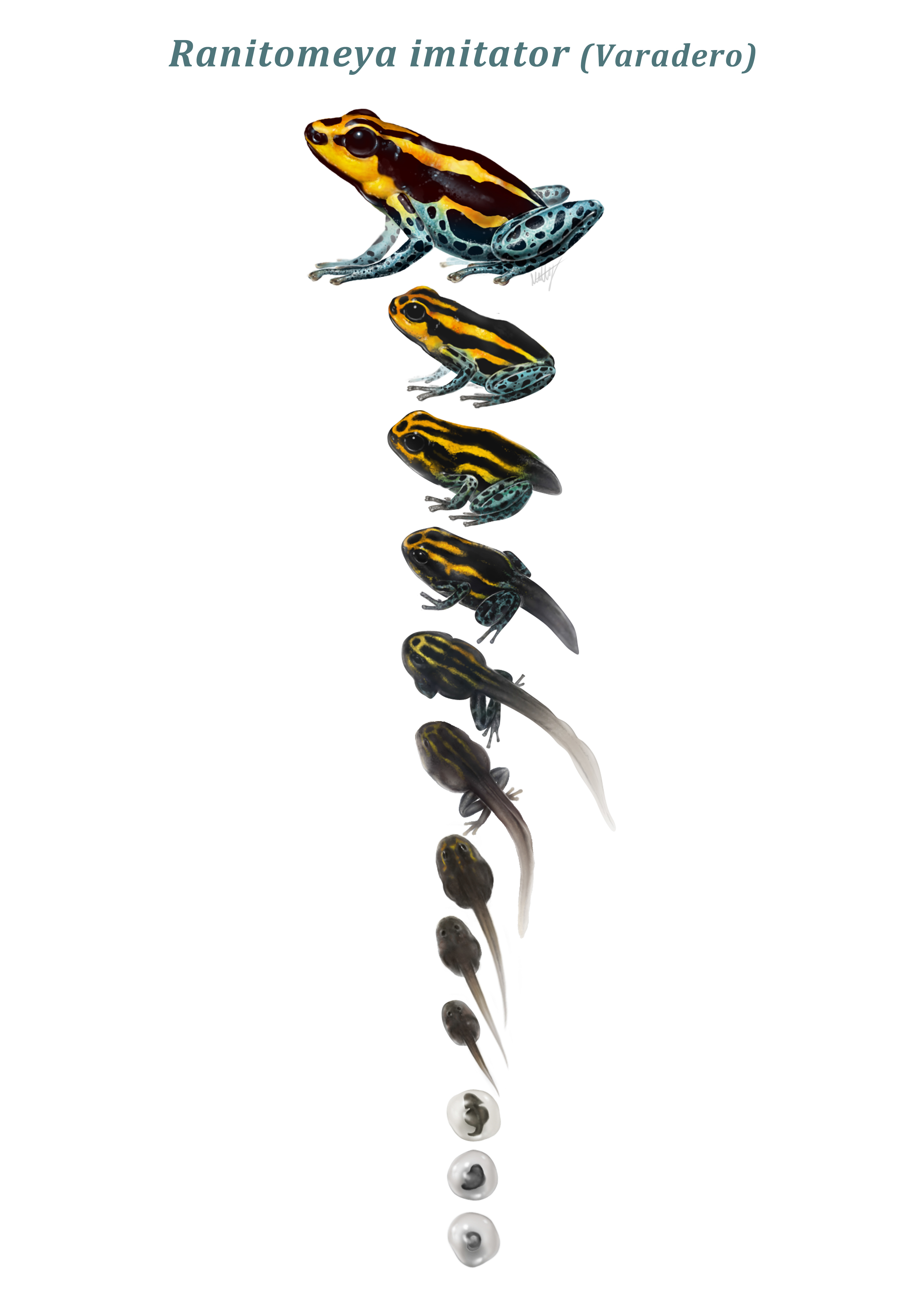
Ranitomeya imitator's developmental life stages

Many species of poison dart frogs are dedicated parents. Many poison dart frogs in the genera Oophaga and Ranitomeya carry their newly hatched tadpoles into the canopy; the tadpoles stick to the mucus on the backs of their parents. Once in the upper reaches of the rainforest trees, the parents deposit their young in the pools of water that accumulate in epiphytic plants, such as bromeliads. The tadpoles feed on invertebrates in their nursery, and their mother will even supplement their diet by depositing eggs into the water. Other poison frogs lay their eggs on the forest floor, hidden beneath the leaf litter. Poison frogs fertilize their eggs externally; the female lays a cluster of eggs and a male fertilizes them afterward, in the same manner as most fish. Poison frogs can often be observed clutching each other, similar to the manner most frogs copulate. However, these demonstrations are actually territorial wrestling matches. Both males and females frequently engage in disputes over territory. A male will fight for the most prominent roosts from which to broadcast his mating call; females fight over desirable nests, and even invade the nests of other females to devour competitor's eggs.

The operational sex ratio in the poison dart frog family is mostly female biased. This leads to a few characteristic behaviors and traits found in organisms with an uneven sex ratio. In general, females have a choice of mate. In turn, males show brighter coloration, are territorial, and are aggressive toward other males. Females select mates based on coloration (mainly dorsal), calling perch location, and territory.

==== Mating behavior ====
Observations of the Dendrobatidae family suggest that males of the species typically make their mating call in morning between the times of 6:30 am to 11:30 am. The males are usually on average one meter above the ground on limbs, trunks, and stems, or logs of trees so that their call travels further and so they can be seen by potential mates. The calls are signaled towards the stream where females are located. After the call is received, the female makes its way to the male and fertilization occurs. This observed fertilization is not accomplished through amplexus. Upon meeting, courtship is generally initiated by the female. The female strokes, climbs, and jumps on the male in tactile courtship and are by far the more active sex. The duration of courtship in poison frogs is long and females may occasionally reject males, even after an entire day of active pursuit. In the majority of cases, the males choose the oviposition site and lead the females there. In some Dendrobatidae species, such as strawberry poison frog, visual cues under high light intensity are also used to identify individuals from the same population. Different species use different cues to identify individuals from their same population during mating and courtship.

==== Post-mating behavior ====
Typically in many species the larger portion of parental investment falls on the shoulders of the female sex, whereas the male sex has a much smaller portion. However, it has been studied that in the family of Dendrobatidae, many of the species exhibit sex role reversal in which the females are competing for a limited number of males and the males are the choosers and their parental investment is much larger than the females. This theory also says that the female will typically produce eggs at an exceedingly fast rate that the males cannot possibly take full care of them which then leads to some of the males becoming unreceptive. Dendrobatidae also exhibit the parental quality hypothesis. This is where the females mating with the males try to ensure that their male mates with as few individuals as possible so that their number of offspring is limited, and thus each individual offspring receives a larger portion of care, attention, and resources. However, this creates an interesting dynamic of balance as there is a limited number of males available, and with many females competing for a limited number of males for courtship this makes it difficult to limit the number of individuals a male mates with. Whereas in many species, the competition is flipped in that the competition is prominent among the males, among the Dendrobatidae it is the opposite as the females seem to have a great deal of competition among themselves for males. Females will even take the drastic measures and resort to the destroying of other female's eggs in order to make sure that the male they mated with is receptive and that it scares the male from mating with other females.

==== Behavior as tadpoles ====
The poison dart frog is known for its aggressive and predatory behavior. As tadpoles, the individuals of the genus Dendrobates exhibit some unique cannibalistic tendencies, along with many other forms of predatory behavior. Dendrobates tadpoles that either consumed three or more conspecific tadpoles and/or relatively large larvae of the mosquito Trichoprosopon digitatum common in their environment led them to having a much higher growth rate and typically lived much longer lives. Reasons for this behavior could be that predation and aggression was selected for and favored for a few reasons. One reason is to eliminate predators, and the second reason is that it serves as a source of food in habitats that were low in resources. This predation could have evolved over time and led to cannibalism as another form of predatory behavior that had benefitted individuals survival fitness. However, one observation has been noted in the general characteristic of Dendrobates tadpoles including D. arboreus, D. granuliferus, D. lehmanni, D. occultator, D. pumilio, D. speciosus, and many other Dendrobates species is that they have reduced mouth parts as young tadpoles which limits their consumption typically to unfertilized eggs only.

== Captive care ==
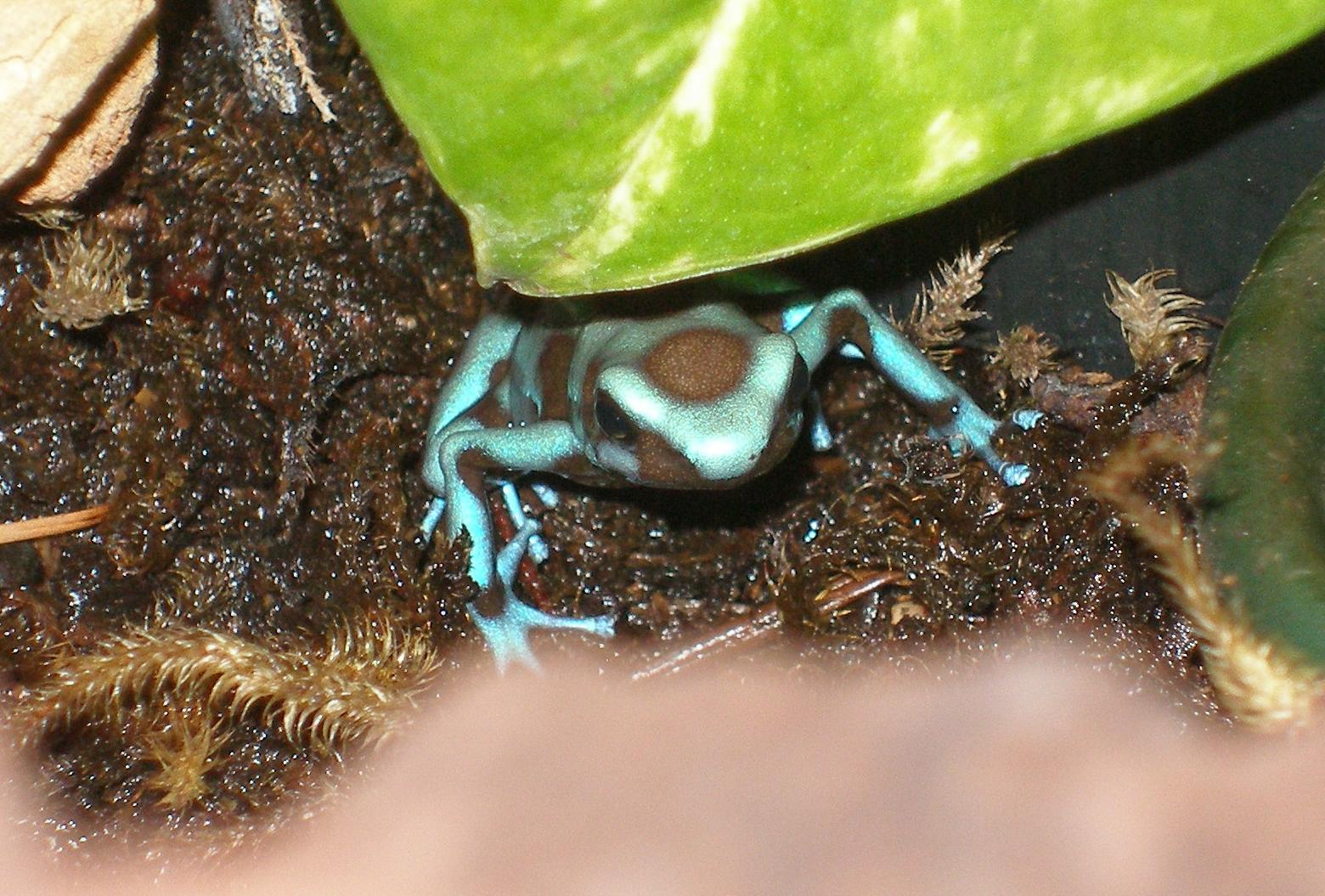
Captive female D. auratus.

All species of poison dart frogs are Neotropical in origin. Wild-caught specimens can maintain toxicity for some time (which they obtain through a form of bioaccumulation), so appropriate care should be taken when handling them. While scientific study on the lifespan of poison dart frogs is scant, retagging frequencies indicate it can range from one to three years in the wild. However, these frogs typically live for much longer in captivity, having been reported to live as long as 25 years. These claims also seem to be questionable, since many of the larger species take a year or more to mature, and Phyllobates species can take more than two years.

In captivity, most species thrive where the humidity is kept constant at 80 to 100% and where the temperature is around 72 °F (22 °C) to 80 °F (27 °C) during the day and no lower than 60 °F (16 °C) to 65 °F (18 °C) at night. Some species tolerate lower temperatures better than others.

== Conservation status ==
Many species of poison dart frogs have recently experienced habitat loss, chytrid diseases, and collection for the pet trade. Some are listed as threatened or endangered as a result. Zoos have tried to counteract this disease by treating captive frogs with an antifungal agent that is used to cure athlete's foot in humans.

== Threats ==
=== Parasites ===
Poison dart frogs suffer from parasites ranging from helminths to protozoans.

=== Diseases ===
Poison dart frogs suffer from chytridiomycosis, which is a deadly disease that is caused by the fungus Batrachochytrium dendrobatidis (Bd). This infection has been found in frogs from Colostethus and Dendrobates.

== See also ==
- Mantella – Malagasy poison frogs
- Poisonous amphibians
