= Miranda green racer =

There are two species of snake named Miranda green racer:

- Philodryas mattogrossensis
- Philodryas erlandi
