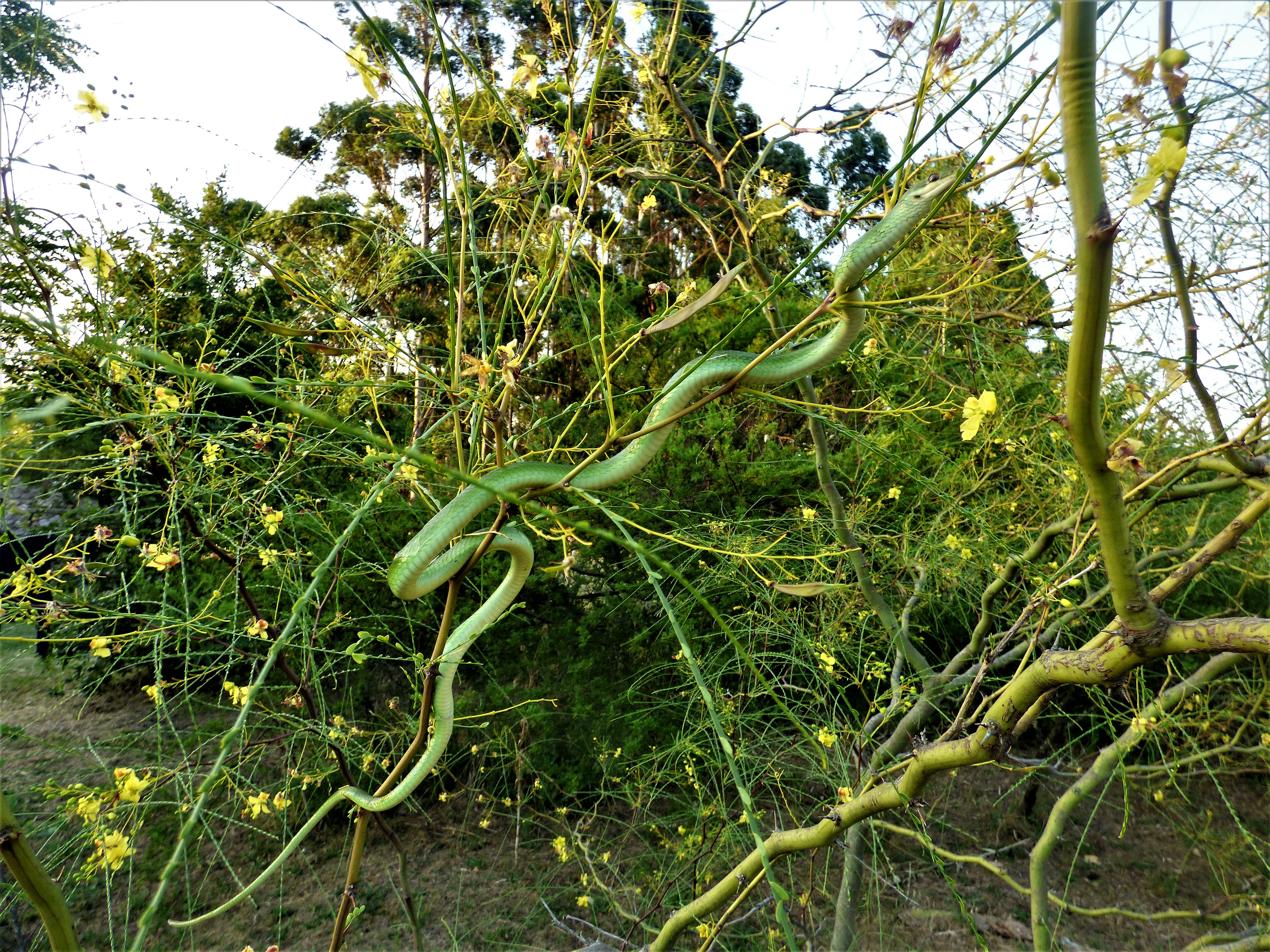

Conservation status
- Least Concern (IUCN 3.1)

Scientific classification
- Kingdom: Animalia
- Phylum: Chordata
- Class: Reptilia
- Order: Squamata
- Suborder: Serpentes
- Family: Colubridae
- Genus: Philodryas
- Species: P. aestiva

Binomial name
- Philodryas aestiva (Duméril, Bibron & Duméril, 1854)

= Philodryas aestiva =

Species of snake

Philodryas aestiva is a species of snake of the family Colubridae. It is commonly known as the Brazilian green racer and the common green racer.

== Etymology ==
The genus Philodryas, Philo which is Greek means "loving" or "fond of" and dryas also Greek means "tree" or "oak," also used for "tree nymph" in mythology. Philodryas can be interpreted as "tree-loving" or "fond of trees." The species name aestiva comes from the Latin aestīvus and means "of the summer" or "summery" which could refer to its active season or its green coloration. If you put the name together, Philodryas aestiva roughly means "summer-loving tree snake" or "summery tree-dweller", hinting at its habitat and activity patterns.

== Geographic range ==
Philodryas aestiva inhabits a wide range of environments in southwestern Brazil, northern Argentina, Paraguay, Bolivia, and Uruguay. They prefer open forests and savannahs (such as the Cerrado biome in Brazil) but are sometimes found in semi-urban or rural areas.

== Biology ==
=== Behavior ===
Philodryas aestiva is a highly agile snake. Its slender body and large eyes contribute not only to its swift movement but also to its climbing ability. It is diurnal meaning it actively forages during the day. It is primarily terrestrial.

=== Diet ===
P. aestiva uses active foraging taking advantage of its speed and agility. This species primarily feeds on frogs and small mammals, and occasionally on lizards, birds, and arthropods.

=== Venom ===
P. aestiva produces mild venom from its Duvernoy’s glands (gland found in some groups of colubrid snakes, it is distinguished from the venom gland of viperids or elapids) which helps subdue small prey. While not dangerous to humans, the venom contains compounds such as snake venom metalloproteinases that contribute to prey immobilization and digestion through hemorrhagic and inflammatory effects.

=== Reproduction ===
This species is oviparous (egg-laying). P. aestiva females are gravid in both the warmer and colder seasons of the year. The eggs were restricted to a period from middle-winter to early summer, which indicates that the reproductive cycle may follow a seasonal pattern.

=== Sexual dimorphism ===
While P. aestiva do not exhibit extreme visual differences between sexes, there are subtle distinctions. Males are generally smaller and more slender, while females tend to be larger and more robust, especially during the breeding season. Males have longer tails relative to their body length, whereas females have shorter tails. Additionally, the cloacal distance (from vent to tail tip) is greater in males and shorter in females. These features are most noticeable when comparing individuals side by side. In the field, determining sex typically requires gentle probing or visual inspection by trained herpetologists.

== Conservation status ==
As of its last IUCN assessment in 2014 P. aestiva was listed as of "least concern."
