= Erythrolamprus torrenicola =

Conservation status
- Least Concern (IUCN 3.1)

Scientific classification
- Kingdom: Animalia
- Phylum: Chordata
- Class: Reptilia
- Order: Squamata
- Suborder: Serpentes
- Family: Colubridae
- Genus: Erythrolamprus
- Species: E. torrenicola

Binomial name
- Erythrolamprus torrenicola (Donnelly & C. Myers, 1991)

Species of snake

Erythrolamprus torrenicola, the velvety swamp snake, is a species of snake in the family Colubridae. The species is found in Venezuela.
