= Sphenomorphus rarus =

Conservation status
- Data Deficient (IUCN 3.1)

Scientific classification
- Kingdom: Animalia
- Phylum: Chordata
- Class: Reptilia
- Order: Squamata
- Family: Scincidae
- Genus: Sphenomorphus
- Species: S. rarus

Binomial name
- Sphenomorphus rarus Myers & Donnelly, 1991

Species of lizard

Sphenomorphus rarus is a species of skink found in Panama.
