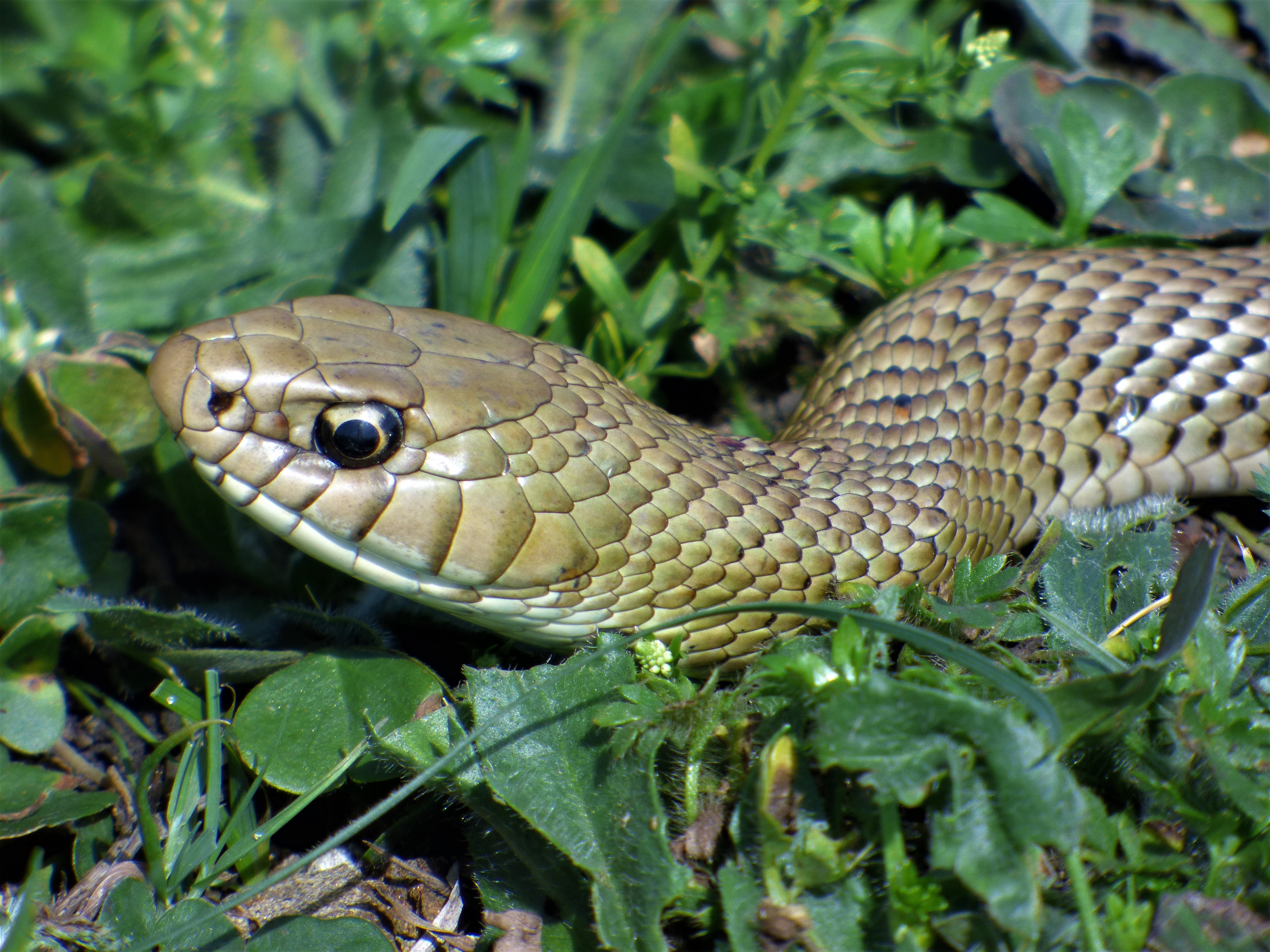
- Philodryas patagoniensis
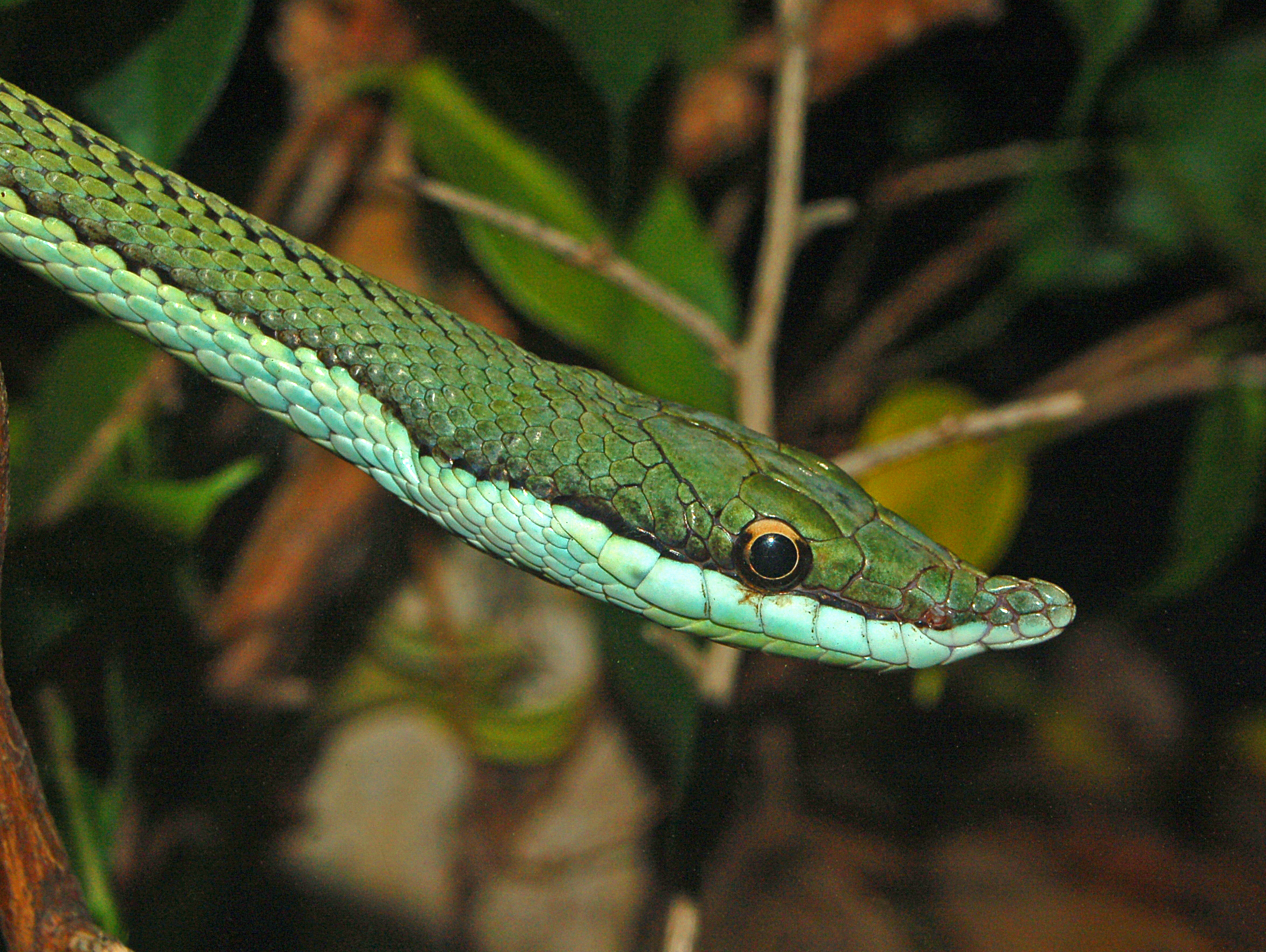
- Philodryas baroni

Scientific classification
- Kingdom: Animalia
- Phylum: Chordata
- Class: Reptilia
- Order: Squamata
- Suborder: Serpentes
- Family: Colubridae
- Subfamily: Dipsadinae
- Genus: Philodryas; Wagler, 1830

Species
- See text

Synonyms
- Atamophis, Callirhinus, Chlorosoma, Dirrhox, Dryophylax, Euophrys, Galeophis, Herpetodryas, Lygophis, Pseudablabes, Teleolepis, Xenodon

= Philodryas =

Genus of snakes

Philodryas is a genus of colubrid snakes endemic to South America, commonly called green snakes.

== Description ==
Species in the genus Philodryas share the following characters:

Head distinct from neck, with distinct canthus rostralis. Eye moderate or large. Pupil round. Body cylindrical or slightly laterally compressed. Tail long.

Dorsal scales arranged in 17 to 23 rows at midbody, more or less obliquely. Subcaudals divided (in two rows).

Maxillary teeth smallest anteriorly, 12–15, followed after a gap by two large grooved fangs located just behind the posterior border of the eye.

== Venom ==
Although colubrid snakes are usually harmless to humans, Philodryas are opisthoglyphous (rear-fanged) snakes and can give a venomous bite.

== Species and geographic ranges ==
There are 16 recognized species.

- Philodryas aestiva (A.M.C. Duméril, Bibron & A.H.A. Duméril, 1854) – N Argentina, Bolivia, SE Brazil, Paraguay, Uruguay - Brazilian green racer, common green racer
- Philodryas agassizii (Jan, 1863) – Brazil, Argentina, Uruguay, Paraguay - burrowing night snake
- Philodryas arnaldoi (Amaral, 1932) – Brazil - Arnaldo's green race
- Philodryas baroni Berg, 1895 – N Argentina - Baron's green racer
- Philodryas boliviana Boulenger, 1896 – Bolivia - Bolivian racer
- Philodryas chamissonis (Wiegmann, 1834) – Chile - Chilean green racer, Chilean long-tailed snake
- Philodryas cordata Donnelly & C. Myers, 1991 – Venezuela
- Philodryas erlandi Lönnberg, 1902 – Paraguay, southeastern Bolivia, northern Argentina - Miranda green racer
- Philodryas livida (Amaral, 1923) – Brazil
- Philodryas mattogrossensis Koslowsky, 1898 – Bolivia, SW Brazil, Paraguay - Miranda green racer
- Philodryas nattereri Steindachner, 1870 – WC Brazil, Paraguay - Paraguay green racer
- Philodryas olfersii (Lichtenstein, 1823) – Argentina, Bolivia, W Brazil, Paraguay, E Peru, Uruguay - Lichtenstein's green racer
- Philodryas patagoniensis (Girard, 1858) – Brazil, Bolivia, Paraguay, Argentina, Uruguay - Patagonia green racer
- Philodryas psammophidea Günther, 1872 – Argentina, W & S Brazil - Günther's green racer
- Philodryas trilineata (Burmeister, 1861) – Argentina
- Philodryas varia (Jan, 1863) – Argentina, Bolivia - Jan's green racer

Nota bene: A binomial authority in parentheses indicates that the species was originally described in a genus other than Philodryas.
