= Arthrosaura =

Scientific classification
- Kingdom: Animalia
- Phylum: Chordata
- Class: Reptilia
- Order: Squamata
- Family: Gymnophthalmidae
- Subfamily: Ecpleopinae
- Genus: Arthrosaura; Boulenger, 1885

Diversity
- Seven species (see text)

Genus of lizards

Arthrosaura is a genus of spectacled lizards in the family Gymnophthalmidae.

== Geographic range ==
Lizards in the genus Arthrosaura are native to northern South America.

== Taxonomy ==
Within the genus Arthrosaura there appears to be two species groups: a longer-legged, short-bodied group with four supraocular scales (A. kockii, and A. testigensis); and a short-legged, gracile group with three supraoculars (A. reticulata, A. synaptolepis, A. tyleri, and A. versteegii).

== Species ==
There are seven species which are recognized as being valid:

- Arthrosaura kockii (Lidth de Jeude, 1904)
- Arthrosaura montigena Myers & Donnelly, 2008
- Arthrosaura reticulata (O’Shaughnessy, 1881) – yellowbelly arthrosaura
- Arthrosaura synaptolepis Donnelly, McDiarmid & Myers, 1992
- Arthrosaura testigensis Gorzula & Señaris, 1999
- Arthrosaura tyleri (C. Burt & M. Burt, 1931)
- Arthrosaura versteegii Lidth de Jeude, 1904
