= Plica lumaria =

Scientific classification
- Kingdom: Animalia
- Phylum: Chordata
- Class: Reptilia
- Order: Squamata
- Suborder: Iguania
- Family: Tropiduridae
- Genus: Plica
- Species: P. lumaria

Binomial name
- Plica lumaria Donnelly & Myers, 1991

Species of lizard

Plica lumaria is a species of South American lizard in the family Tropiduridae. The species is found in Venezuela.
