= Philodryas cordata =

Conservation status
- Least Concern (IUCN 3.1)

Scientific classification
- Kingdom: Animalia
- Phylum: Chordata
- Class: Reptilia
- Order: Squamata
- Suborder: Serpentes
- Family: Colubridae
- Genus: Philodryas
- Species: P. cordata

Binomial name
- Philodryas cordata Donnelly & Myers, 1991

Species of snake

Philodryas cordata is a species of snake of the family Colubridae.

== Geographic range ==
The snake is found in Venezuela.
