= Arthrosaura synaptolepis =

Conservation status
- Least Concern (IUCN 3.1)

Scientific classification
- Kingdom: Animalia
- Phylum: Chordata
- Class: Reptilia
- Order: Squamata
- Family: Gymnophthalmidae
- Genus: Arthrosaura
- Species: A. synaptolepis

Binomial name
- Arthrosaura synaptolepis Donnelly, McDiarmid, & Myers, 1992

Species of lizard

Arthrosaura synaptolepis is a species of lizard in the family Gymnophthalmidae. It is found on granite mountains in tropical forests in Venezuela and Brazil. It is also known as Donneisy's Arthrosaura.
