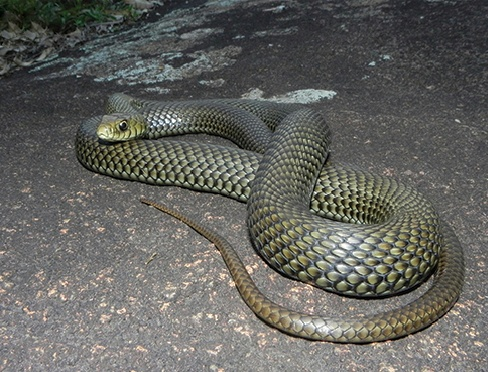

Conservation status
- Least Concern (IUCN 3.1)

Scientific classification
- Kingdom: Animalia
- Phylum: Chordata
- Class: Reptilia
- Order: Squamata
- Suborder: Serpentes
- Family: Colubridae
- Genus: Philodryas
- Species: P. patagoniensis

Binomial name
- Philodryas patagoniensis (Girard, 1858)

Synonyms
- Callirhinus patagoniensis Girard, 1858; Pseudophis patagoniensis — Cope, 1862; Dirrhox patagoniensis — Cope, 1887; Philodryas patagoniensis — Hoge, 1964; Pseudablabes patagoniensis — Melo-Sampaio et al., 2020

= Philodryas patagoniensis =

Species of reptile

Philodryas patagoniensis, also known as the Patagonia green racer, is a species of rear-fanged (opisthoglyphous) venomous snake in the family Colubridae. The species is endemic to cis-Andean South America from northern Argentina to northeastern Brazil; despite its name, most of its range is outside Patagonia.

== Description ==
P. patagoniensis is a medium-sized, cylindrical and robust snake, with a moderately long tail. It can grow to a maximum total length (including tail) of 150 cm (59 in). The snout is rounded. The eye is medium-sized with a round pupil. The dorsal scales are smooth with unique apical scores.

== Behavior ==
P. patagoniensis is terrestrial, fundamentally arboreal when foraging, and has daytime habits. It has a brownish color that helps in its camouflage.

== Sexual dimorphism and reproduction ==
P. patagoniensis has sexual dimorphism in adult specimens. Females have a longer body, with greater corpulence, while males have a longer tail. Females are born with a greater rostro-cloacal length and reach sexual maturity later than males, about 2-years-old. Males can reach sexual maturity at 1-year-old. Reproduction is seasonal, with the vitellogenic season occurring between the months of July and October.

== Diet ==
P. patagoniensis preys upon snakes including its own species. Juveniles feed on ectothermic animals, while adults feed on endothermic animals.

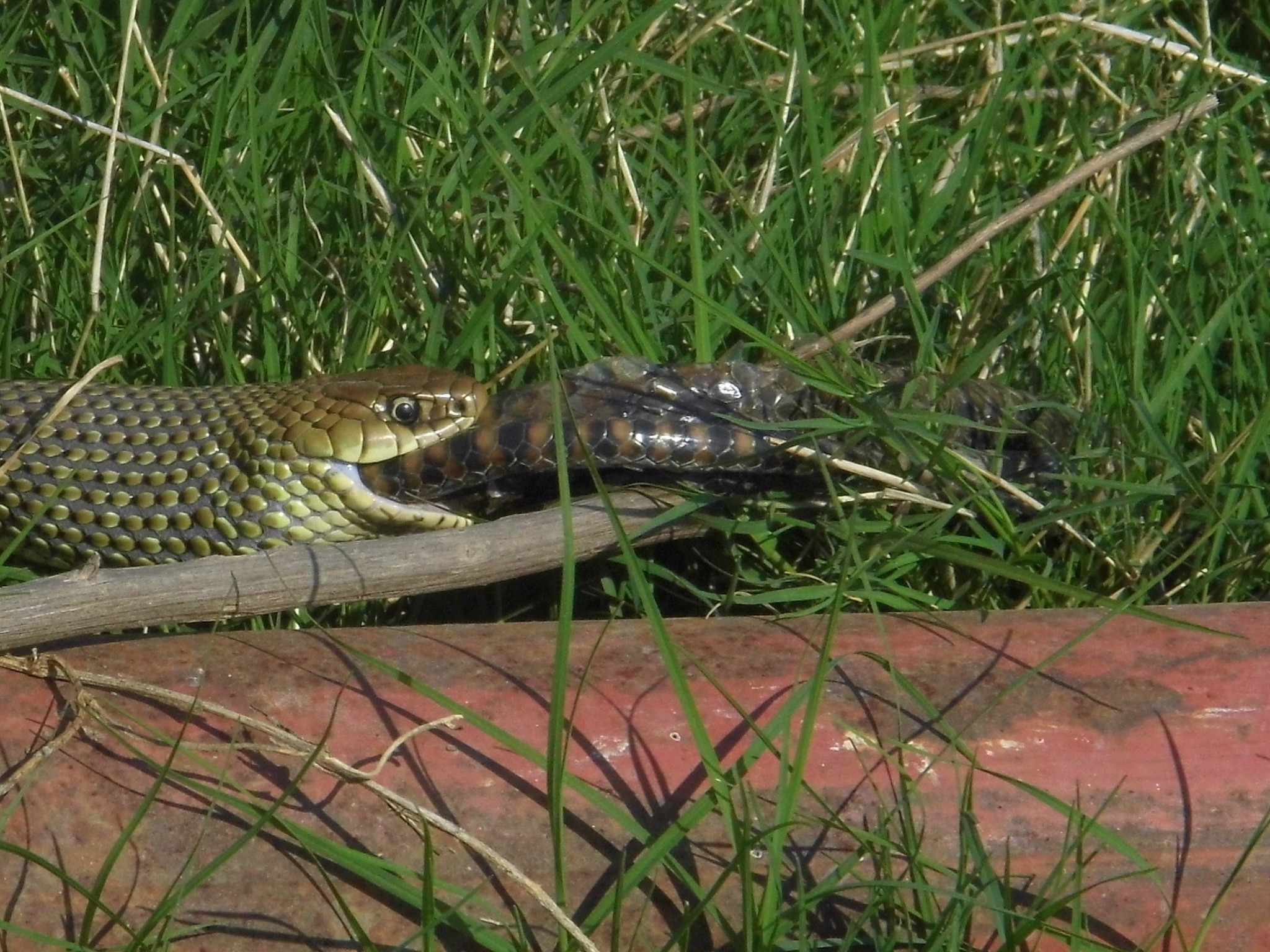
Eating a leopard keelback

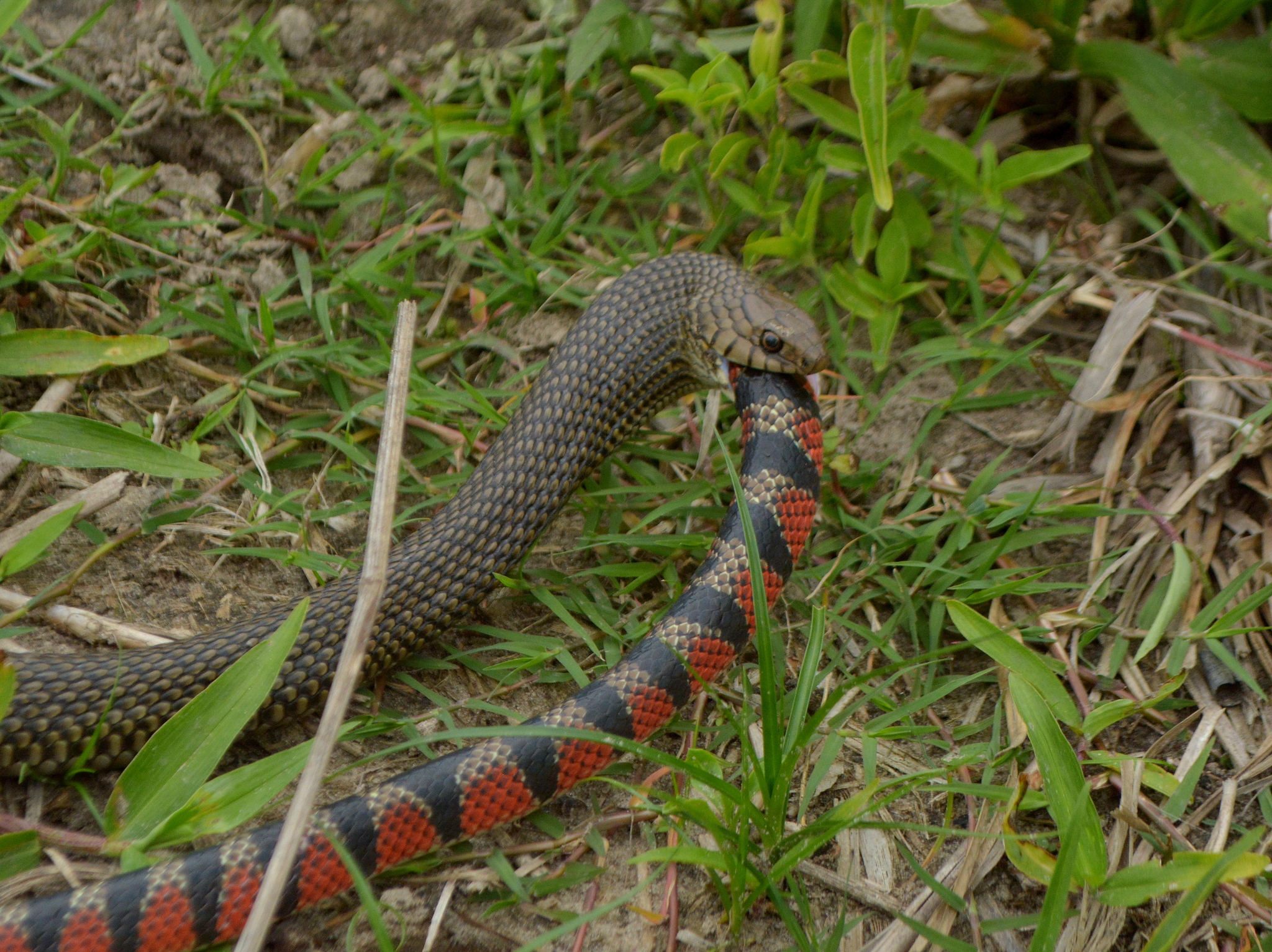
Eating an Amazon false coral snake

== Predators ==
P. patagoniensis is preyed upon by birds such as Cariama cristata and Tyto furcata, as well as other snakes such as Boiruna maculata.

== Geographic range ==
P. patagoniensis is found in Argentina, Bolivia, Brazil, Paraguay, and Uruguay.

== Habitat ==
P. patagoniensis occurs in a range of open habitats including Patagonian steppe, Cerrado, Chaco, and Caatinga, and also open areas of the Atlantic forest.

== Common names ==
Common names for P. patagoniensis include corre campo, parelheira, parelheira comum, papa pinto, culebra del alfa, culebra de los pastos, ratonera, and mboi hovy.

== Venom ==
P. patagoniensis produces toxic saliva through the Duvernoy's gland. Its toxin is constituted by 90% protein, mainly metalloproteinases. The biological activity of the toxins is very similar to that of Bothrops, with edematogenic, hemorrhagic, nociceptive, and necrosis activity of this compound. This species has an LD_{50} of 58.58 μg (mouse), a value close to Bothrops jararacussu with 58.8 μg (mouse). Its toxicity is between that of Bothrops alternatus with 67.5 μg (mouse) and Bothrops jararaca with 24.7 μg (mouse). However, P. patagoniensis has opisthoglyphous dentition and has difficulty injecting venom. Its venom also contains neurotoxic and myotoxic components, which result in neuromuscular block and myonecrosis.
