= Adercosaurus =

Conservation status
- Least Concern (IUCN 3.1)

Scientific classification
- Kingdom: Animalia
- Phylum: Chordata
- Class: Reptilia
- Order: Squamata
- Family: Gymnophthalmidae
- Genus: Adercosaurus; Myers & Donnelly, 2001
- Species: A. vixadnexus

Binomial name
- Adercosaurus vixadnexus Myers & Donnelly, 2001

Genus of lizards

Adercosaurus is a genus of the lizard family Gymnophthalmidae. The genus is monotypic, i.e. it has only one species, Adercosaurus vixadnexus. It occurs in Venezuela.
