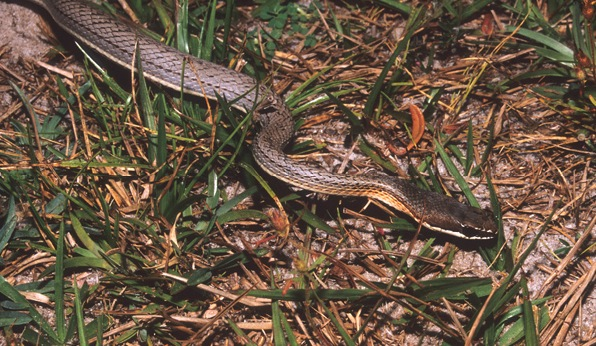

Conservation status
- Least Concern (IUCN 3.1)

Scientific classification
- Kingdom: Animalia
- Phylum: Chordata
- Class: Reptilia
- Order: Squamata
- Suborder: Serpentes
- Family: Colubridae
- Genus: Philodryas
- Species: P. nattereri

Binomial name
- Philodryas nattereri Steindachner, 1870

= Philodryas nattereri =

Species of snake

Philodryas nattereri, also known commonly as the Paraguay green racer and the Paraguayan green racer, is a species of venomous snake in the subfamily Dipsadinae of the family Colubridae. The species is native to eastern South America.

== Etymology ==
The specific name, nattereri, is in honor of Austrian naturalist Johann Natterer.

== Description ==
Adults of Philodryas nattereri have an average total length (tail included) of 80 cm (31 in), but it can grow to a maximum total length of 1.34 m (4.4 ft). It is characterized by a medium body, a long, slender tail, a slightly prominent and obliquely truncated snout, and moderately large eyes with round pupils. Its coloring varies from brown to gray, giving it camouflage against ground foliage.

== Behavior ==
Philodryas nattereri is a fast snake with terrestrial habits, although recent studies have shown that this species can use arboreal environments with high efficiency. It is active during the day and can be quite aggressive when threatened. P. nattereri is opisthoglyphous (rear-fanged), and due to this dentition, it has difficulty injecting venom into large prey.

== Geographic distribution ==
Philodryas nattereri is found in eastern Brazil and Paraguay.

== Habitat ==
The preferred natural habitats of Philodryas nattereri are open forests, fields and cerrado.

== Diet ==
Philodryas nattereri feeds on a wide variety of prey, including birds, mammals, lizards, amphibians, lizard eggs and even other snakes.

== Reproduction ==
Philodryas nattereri is oviparous.

== Venom ==
The venom of Philodryas nattereri is quite active. It can cause dermo necrosis, myonecrosis, and hemorrhagic activity, resulting in mast cell degranulation, muscle damage and inflammation. Studies with rats have shown that venom from this species is capable of causing bleeding in different organs and morphological alterations. The venom of this species appears to be as active as that of Philodryas olfersii, and has a protein content of 863.9 μg, which corresponds to 86.3% of the entire venom.
