= Plica pansticta =

Conservation status
- Least Concern (IUCN 3.1)

Scientific classification
- Kingdom: Animalia
- Phylum: Chordata
- Class: Reptilia
- Order: Squamata
- Suborder: Iguania
- Family: Tropiduridae
- Genus: Plica
- Species: P. pansticta

Binomial name
- Plica pansticta Myers & Donnelly, 2001

Species of lizard

Plica pansticta is a species of South American lizard in the family Tropiduridae. The species is found in Venezuela.
