= Pristimantis memorans =

Conservation status
- Data Deficient (IUCN 3.1)

Scientific classification
- Kingdom: Animalia
- Phylum: Chordata
- Class: Amphibia
- Order: Anura
- Family: Strabomantidae
- Genus: Pristimantis
- Species: P. memorans

Binomial name
- Pristimantis memorans (Myers and Donnelly, 1997)

Synonyms
- Eleutherodactylus memorans Myers and Donnelly, 1997

Species of amphibian

Pristimantis memorans is a species of frog in the family Strabomantidae. It is found in the Sierra Tapirapecó of Amazonas state, Venezuela (the type locality) and the adjacent Brazilian state of Amazonas, where the range is known as Serra do Tapirapecó. The specific name memorans is derived from the present participle of the Latin memoro (="to relate or recount something") and refers to an airplane crash that the expedition witnessed in the jungle below the campsite.

== Description ==
Adult males measure 19–23 mm (0.75–0.91 in) and females 31–32 mm (1.2–1.3 in) in snout–vent length. The head is narrower than the body (more so in females) and longer than it is wide. The snout is rounded or bluntly pointed in dorsal view and rounded in lateral view. The tympanum is distinct and vertically elongated. The fingers and toes have terminal discs but no webbing. Skin on the dorsum is tubercular. Ground color is usually brown, but individuals were reddish or orangish or even dark greenish brown. There are vague, black markings, including a bar between the eyes, and in many individuals, a W-shaped mark behind the head. Some specimens may have scattered, small, pale yellow spots. The ventrum is gray, sometimes with pale spots.

Males have a large subgular vocal sac. The male advertisement call consists of 1–4 loud "tinks". Males seem to answer their neighbors' calls with similar calls, that is, two-note call would trigger a two-note call. The dominant frequency is 2480–2760 Hz.

== Distribution and habitat ==
The species' natural habitats are montane forests at elevations of 350–1,270 m (1,150–4,170 ft) above sea level. Individuals have been found in dense ridge-top forest where males were calling both day and night, in low vegetation in a stream-side forest at night, and on the ground in a forest bordering a river. Calling activity suggested an abundant population at the ridge-top site, even though individuals were difficult to locate. Development is direct, without free-living larval stage.

== Conservation ==
No major threats to this species are known. It occurs in the Parima Tapirapecó National Park, Venezuela.

Records of Pristimantis memorans near the border between Venezuela and Brazil.
