= Atractus hostilitractus =

Conservation status
- Data Deficient (IUCN 3.1)

Scientific classification
- Kingdom: Animalia
- Phylum: Chordata
- Class: Reptilia
- Order: Squamata
- Suborder: Serpentes
- Family: Colubridae
- Genus: Atractus
- Species: A. hostilitractus

Binomial name
- Atractus hostilitractus Myers, 2003

Species of snake

Atractus hostilitractus is a species of snake in the family Colubridae. The species is known only from eastern Panama, where the only known specimen was collected at Morti Hydro on the Morti River. This site is in the Pacific lowlands, at an elevation of 100–200 m (330–660 ft). The only known specimen of Atractus hostilitractus has a length of 374 mm (14.7 in).The body is pale reddish-brown maculated with black bands.

== Taxonomy ==
Atractus hostilitractus was formally described in 2003 based on an adult female specimen collected in 1967 from Morti Hydro in the Darién Province of Panama. The specific epithet is derived from the Latin words meaning "hostile territory", referring to region around the Morti River, which was inaccessible during the 19th and 20th centuries.

== Description ==
The only known specimen of Atractus hostilitractus has a length of 374 mm (14.7 in). The neck is black and is collared by yellowish-white bands. The body is pale reddish-brown maculated with black bands.

== Distribution and habitat ==
The species is known only from eastern Panama, where the only known specimen was collected at Morti Hydro on the Morti River. This site is in the Pacific lowlands, at an elevation of 100–200 m (330–660 ft). At the time the specimen was collected, it had lowland moist forest and was near a makeshift campsite. The species can probably tolerate at least slightly degraded habitat based on this info.

== Conservation ==
When it was last assessed by the IUCN in 2012, Atractus hostilitractus was assessed as being data-deficient. At that time, the species was known from a single specimen collected over 40 years prior, and almost nothing was known of its range and ecology. The type locality of this snake is protected as the Comarca Kuna de Wargandi indigenous reserve, but still allows selective logging.
