= Anolis charlesmyersi =

Conservation status
- Least Concern (IUCN 3.1)

Scientific classification
- Kingdom: Animalia
- Phylum: Chordata
- Class: Reptilia
- Order: Squamata
- Suborder: Iguania
- Family: Dactyloidae
- Genus: Anolis
- Species: A. charlesmyersi

Binomial name
- Anolis charlesmyersi G. Köhler, 2010

Synonyms
- Anolis pentaprion — C. Myers, 1971 (part.); Anolis charlesmyersi G. Köhler, 2010; Norops charlesmyersi — Nicholson, Crother, Guyer & Savage, 2012

Species of lizard

Anolis charlesmyersi is a species of lizard in the family Dactyloidae. The species is native to Central America.

== Etymology ==
The specific name, charlesmyersi, is in honor of American herpetologist Charles William Myers.

== Geographic range ==
A. charlesmyersi is found in Costa Rica and Panama.

== Habitat ==
The preferred natural habitat of A. charlesmyersi is forest.

== Description ==
A. charlesmyersi is medium-sized for its genus. Adults may attain a snout-to-vent length (SVL) of about 7.5 cm (3.0 in). The tail is relatively short, 1 – 1.5 times SVL. The hind legs are very short for the genus. The dewlap is brick red, with rows of white spots.

== Reproduction ==
A. charlesmyersi is oviparous.
