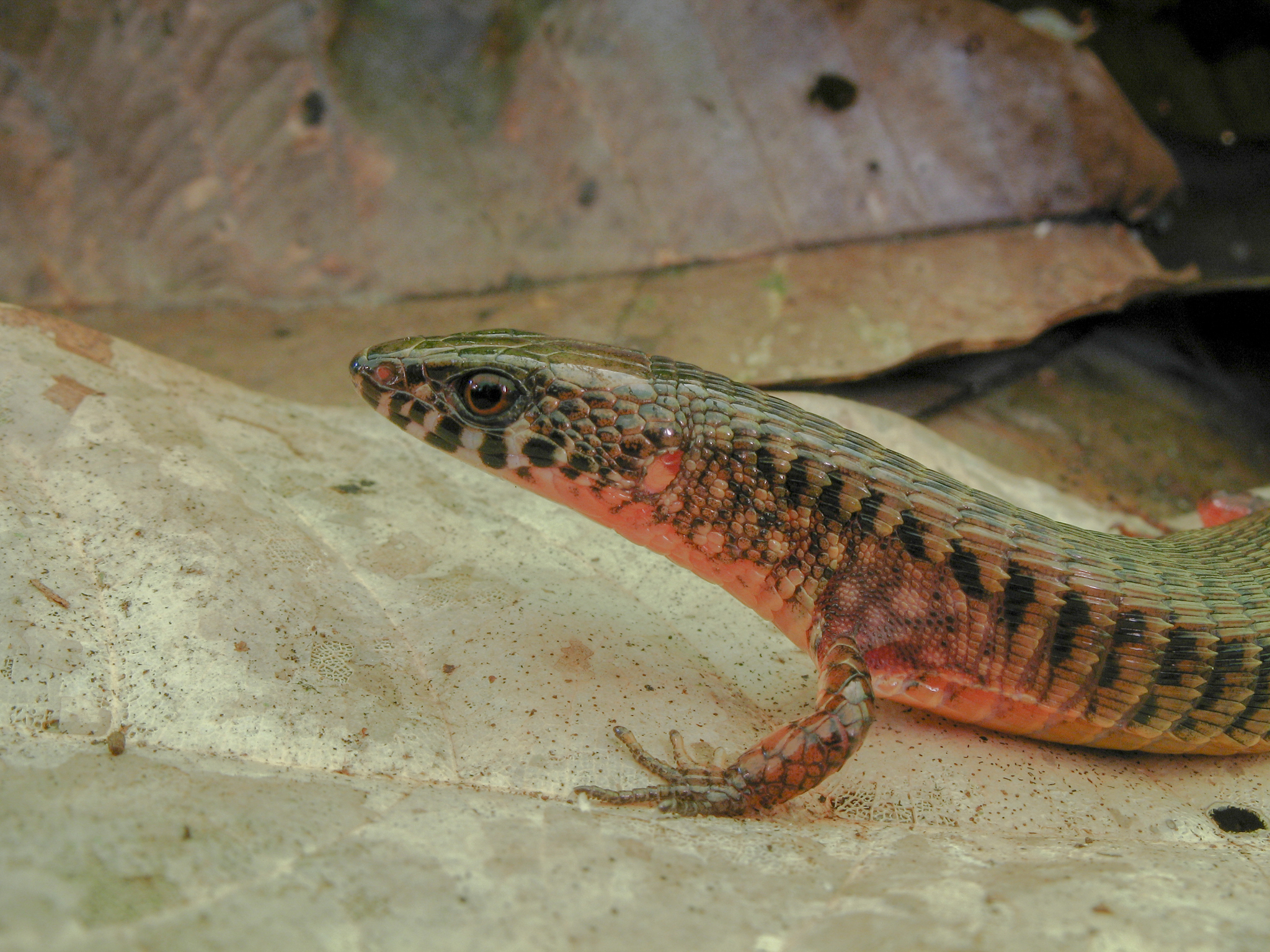
- Yellowbelly Arthrosaura

Scientific classification
- Kingdom: Animalia
- Phylum: Chordata
- Class: Reptilia
- Order: Squamata
- Family: Gymnophthalmidae
- Genus: Arthrosaura
- Species: A. reticulata

Binomial name
- Arthrosaura reticulata (O'Shaughnessy, 1881)

= Arthrosaura reticulata =

Species of lizard

Arthrosaura reticulata, the yellowbelly arthrosaura, is a species of lizard in the family Gymnophthalmidae. It is found in Ecuador, Brazil, Venezuela, Guyana, Colombia, Peru, and Bolivia.
