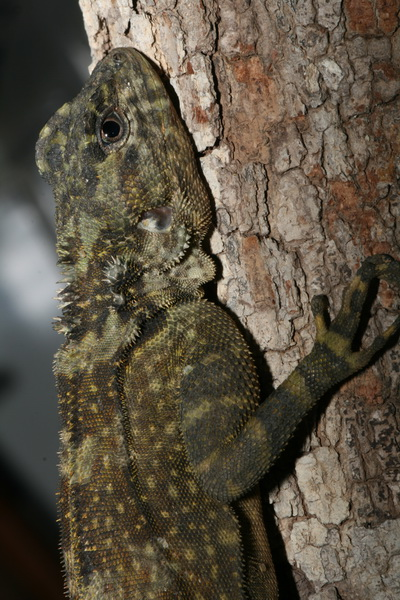

Conservation status
- Least Concern (IUCN 3.1)

Scientific classification
- Kingdom: Animalia
- Phylum: Chordata
- Class: Reptilia
- Order: Squamata
- Suborder: Iguania
- Family: Tropiduridae
- Genus: Plica
- Species: P. plica

Binomial name
- Plica plica (Linnaeus, 1758)

Synonyms
- Lacerta plica Linnaeus, 1758; Sellio plica — Latreille, 1801; Agama plica — Daudin, 1802; Echymotes plica — Fitzinger, 1826; Uraniscodon plica — Kaup, 1827; Hypsibatus plica — Wagler, 1830; Hypselophus plica — Wiegmann, 1835; Ptychosaurus plica — Fitzinger, 1843; Uraniscodon plica — Boulenger, 1885; Plica plica — C. Burt & M. Burt, 1931; Tropidurus plica — Frost, 1992; Plica plica — Murphy & Jowers, 2013

= Plica plica =

Species of lizard

Plica plica is a species of lizard in the family Tropiduridae, the Neotropical ground lizards. Its common names include collared tree lizard, collared tree runner,tree runner, and harlequin racerunner. In Guyana it is known as wakanama.

== Geographic range ==
Plica plica is native to South America, including Colombia, Venezuela, Suriname, French Guiana, Brazil, Bolivia, Peru, and Ecuador. It can also be found in the Caribbean, on Trinidad. It was long ago collected in Grenada, but these specimens were likely waifs.

== Biology ==
Plica plica is diurnal, active during the day, and arboreal, living most of its life adhered to the sides of tree trunks. It comes down from the trees only to lay eggs, which it places inside rotting palm trees and in palm litter. The female produces at least two clutches per reproductive season, with an average clutch size of three eggs. Larger females lay more eggs than smaller ones. The embryos are sensitive to vibration; lightly rolling an egg can induce it to hatch early. The hatchling is known to explode from the egg and immediately begin running, reaching up to half a meter on its first sprint. The diet of the lizard is composed of insects, and it specializes on ants.

== Description ==
The male of Plica plica can exceed 17 cm (6.7 in) snout-vent length (SVL), the female 15 cm (5.9 in). The body is flattened in shape, likely an adaptation to sticking to vertical tree trunks. It has bunches of spines on its neck. It is mostly olive green or greenish in color with dark brown mottling or banding. The chin is whitish, the throat is black, and there is a black "collar" around its neck. It is "mint-chocolate-chip-colored," a color tone that helps it blend into mossy tree bark.

== Habitat ==
The habitat of Plica plica is mainly primary and secondary forest. There it prefers to live on the largest of the forest trees. This lizard has a low active body temperature, around 30.7 °C. This may be related to its habit of remaining on trees in shady forest, where there is little opportunity to bask.

== Parasites ==
Plica plica harbors parasites such the digenea flatworm Mesocoelium monas and several nematodes, such as Oswaldocruzia vitti, Physalopteroides venancioi, Strongyluris oscari, and Physaloptera retusa. The protozoan Plasmodium guyannense was first described from this lizard in 1979.

== In tribal mythology ==
One tribe in the Tucano culture of Colombia holds Plica plica in high regard. It is one of the most important animals in their mythology, and they call it vai-mahse, meaning "lord of animals". It is also a phallic symbol. The lizard's hemipenis is visible at times, an organ that has been described as "aberrant" in shape, and a "small, red stick" that gives the animal special powers. Tucano people under the influence of hallucinogens have created artwork featuring various symbols of masculinity, with some representations bearing strong resemblance to the hemipenis.
