= Arcanumophis =

Scientific classification
- Kingdom: Animalia
- Phylum: Chordata
- Class: Reptilia
- Order: Squamata
- Suborder: Serpentes
- Family: Colubridae
- Subfamily: Dipsadinae
- Genus: Arcanumophis; Smaga, Ttito, & Catenazzi, 2019
- Species: A. problematicus

Binomial name
- Arcanumophis problematicus (Myers, 1986)

Synonyms
- Liophis problematicus; Erythrolamprus problematicus

Genus of snakes

Arcanumophis is a genus of snake in the family Colubridae that contains the sole species Arcanumophis problematicus. the problem ground snake. It is found in Peru. This species was previously placed in the genus Erythrolamprus.
