= Pristimantis pruinatus =

Conservation status
- Vulnerable (IUCN 3.1)

Scientific classification
- Kingdom: Animalia
- Phylum: Chordata
- Class: Amphibia
- Order: Anura
- Family: Strabomantidae
- Genus: Pristimantis
- Species: P. pruinatus

Binomial name
- Pristimantis pruinatus (Myers and Donnelly, 1996)

Synonyms
- Eleutherodactylus pruinatus Myers and Donnelly, 1996

Species of frog

Cerro Yaví

Pristimantis pruinatus, the Yaví rainfrog, is a species of frog in the family Strabomantidae. It is endemic to Venezuela and only known from its type locality, the summit of Cerro Yaví (2,150 m (7,050 ft) above sea level), a sandstone table-top mountain (tepui) in the Amazonas State. The specific name pruinatus refers to the frosted appearance of this frog when alive and is derived from the Latin pruina (="frost") and -atus (="pertaining to").

== Description ==
The type series consists of two females measuring about 27 mm (1.1 in) and one male measuring about 22 mm (0.87 in) in snout–vent length. The body is uniformly blackish with fine, silvery frosting dorsally. The dorsum has granular skin; ventral skin is coarsely areolate. The tympanum is small. The snout is rounded. The upper eyelids have small flat warts. The fingers and toes lack webbing.

== Habitat and conservation ==
It has been collected on low vegetation and in a small cave in montane tepui forest. It is nocturnal. No threats to this species are known.
