= Philodryas boliviana =

Conservation status
- Data Deficient (IUCN 3.1)

Scientific classification
- Kingdom: Animalia
- Phylum: Chordata
- Class: Reptilia
- Order: Squamata
- Suborder: Serpentes
- Family: Colubridae
- Genus: Philodryas
- Species: P. boliviana

Binomial name
- Philodryas boliviana Boulenger, 1896

Species of snake

Philodryas boliviana, the Bolivian racer, is a species of snake of the family Colubridae.

== Geographic range ==
The snake is found in Bolivia.

== Bibliography ==
- Species Philodryas boliviana at The Reptile Database
