= Arthrosaura testigensis =

Conservation status
- Least Concern (IUCN 3.1)

Scientific classification
- Kingdom: Animalia
- Phylum: Chordata
- Class: Reptilia
- Order: Squamata
- Family: Gymnophthalmidae
- Genus: Arthrosaura
- Species: A. testigensis

Binomial name
- Arthrosaura testigensis Gorzula & Señaris, 1999

Species of lizard

Arthrosaura testigensis is a species of lizard in the family Gymnophthalmidae. It is endemic to Venezuelan grasslands.
