= Arthrosaura kockii =

Conservation status
- Least Concern (IUCN 3.1)

Scientific classification
- Kingdom: Animalia
- Phylum: Chordata
- Class: Reptilia
- Order: Squamata
- Family: Gymnophthalmidae
- Genus: Arthrosaura
- Species: A. kockii

Binomial name
- Arthrosaura kockii (Lidth de Jeude, 1904)

Synonyms
- Prionodactylus kockii Lidth de Jeude, 1904; Arthrosaura dorsistriata L. Müller, 1923

Species of lizard

Arthrosaura kockii is a species of lizard in the family Gymnophthalmidae. The species is native to northeastern South America.

== Etymology ==
The specific name, kockii, is in honor of Dutch physician P.J. de Kock who collected natural history specimens in Suriname.

== Description ==
Dorsally, A. kockii is dark brown, with a wide tan vertebral stripe. Ventrally, it is cream-colored.

== Geographic range ==
A. kockii is found in Brazil, French Guiana, and Suriname.

== Habitat ==
The preferred natural habitat of A. kockii is forest at altitudes from sea level to 500 m (1,600 ft).

== Reproduction ==
A. kockii is oviparous.
