= Atractus depressiocellus =

Conservation status
- Data Deficient (IUCN 3.1)

Scientific classification
- Kingdom: Animalia
- Phylum: Chordata
- Class: Reptilia
- Order: Squamata
- Suborder: Serpentes
- Family: Colubridae
- Genus: Atractus
- Species: A. depressiocellus

Binomial name
- Atractus depressiocellus Myers, 2003

Species of snake

Atractus depressiocellus is a species of snake in the family Colubridae. The species can be found in Panama and Colombia. It is a large and heavy-set snake with small, sunken eyes.

== Taxonomy ==
Atractus depressiocellus was formally described in 2003 based on an adult female specimen collected in 1974 from the vicinity of Cerro Azul in the Panamá Province of Panama. The specific epithet is derived from the Latin words meaning "depressed" and "a little eye", referring to its distinctively small and sunken eyes.

== Description ==
Atractus depressiocellus is a large and heavy-set snake with small, sunken eyes. The head is wide and somewhat stout, with a pale brownish color. There is a V-shaped black patch on the back of the neck. The body is largely yellow-brown, with irregular spots or stripes on the dorsum. The tail and rear of the body is more gray-hued than the remainder of the body. Ventrally, the head and throat are light brown, thinly maculated black. The stomach is blackish due to dense markings, with only the neck being more sparsely maculated.

== Distribution and habitat ==
The species is known only from Panama and Colombia, from two localities more than 500 km apart.

== Conservation ==
When it was last assessed by the IUCN in 2012, Atractus depressiocellus was assessed as being data-deficient. At that time, the species was known from a single specimen collected nearly 40 years prior, and almost nothing was known of its range and ecology. The type locality of this snake is threatened by urbanization and animal husbandry; although it occurs within the Chagres National Park, that park has ongoing development occurring inside it.
