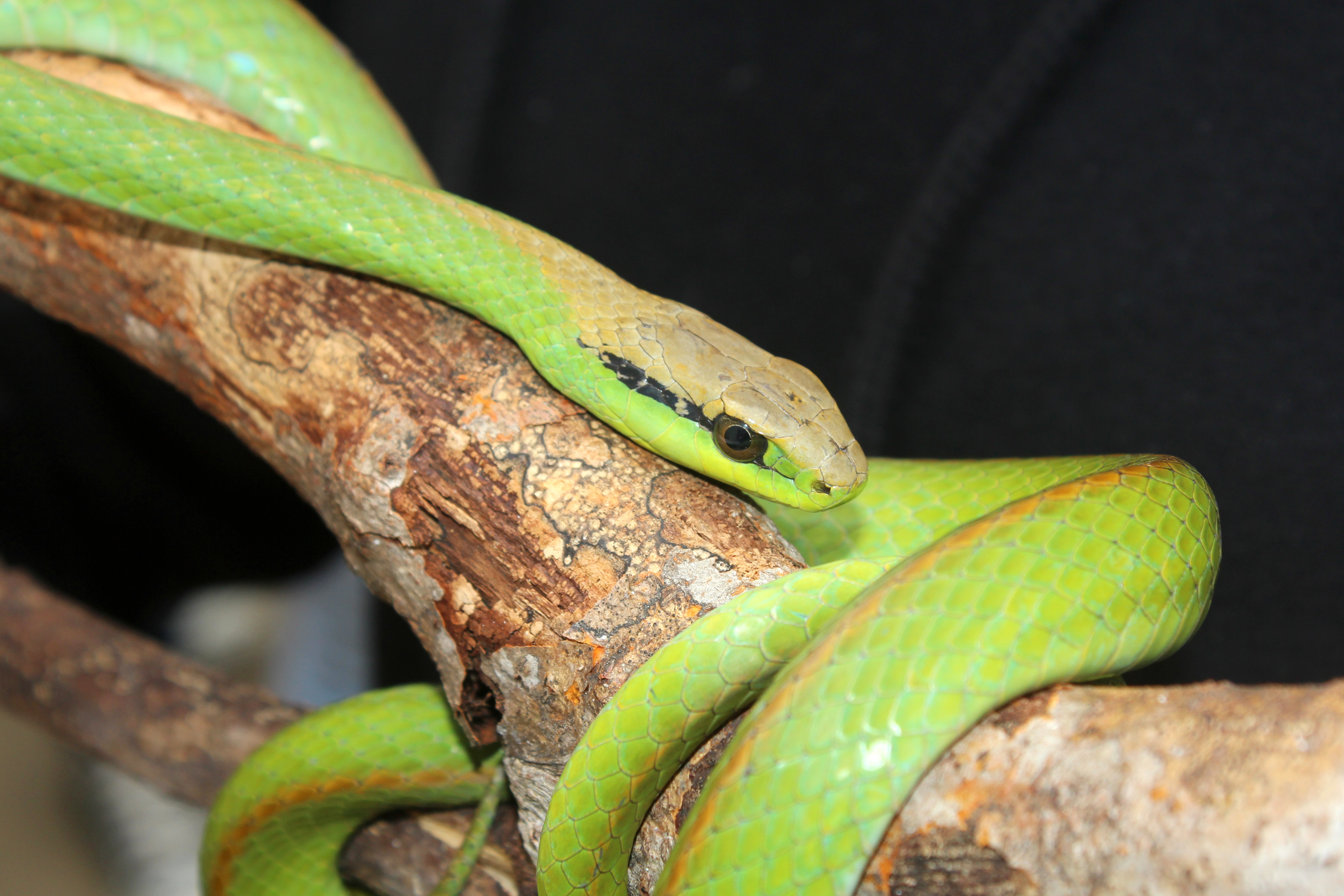

Conservation status
- Least Concern (IUCN 3.1)

Scientific classification
- Kingdom: Animalia
- Phylum: Chordata
- Class: Reptilia
- Order: Squamata
- Suborder: Serpentes
- Family: Colubridae
- Genus: Philodryas
- Species: P. olfersii

Binomial name
- Philodryas olfersii (Lichtenstein, 1823)

Synonyms
- Coluber olfersii Lichtenstein, 1823; Herpetodryas olfersii — Schlegel, 1837; Dryophylax olfersii — A.M.C. Duméril, Bibron & A.H.A. Duméril, 1854; Philodryas olfersii — Günther, 1885

= Philodryas olfersii =

Species of snake

Philodryas olfersii is a species of venomous snake in the subfamily Dipsadinae of the family Colubridae. The species is endemic to South America.

== Common names ==
Common names for Philodryas olfersii include Lichtenstein's green racer, South American green racer, and eastern green whiptail,

== Etymology ==
The specific name, olfersii, is in honor of German naturalist Ignaz von Olfers.

== Geographic range ==
Philodryas olfersii is native to southern South America, including northern Argentina, Brazil, Bolivia, and northwestern Paraguay.

== Description ==
Philodryas olfersii reaches 1 to 1.5 meters (about 40 to 60 inches) in maximum total length (including tail).

Dorsally, it is green in color; ventrally, it is yellowish.

The dorsal scales are smooth, without apical pits, and are arranged in 19 rows at midbody.

== Habitat ==
Philodryas olfersii can be found in many habitat types, including the Cerrado, Caatinga, forest, forest transition, and restinga. It has been found at altitudes from sea level to 1,700 m (5,600 ft).

== Behavior ==
The species Philodryas olfersii is often arboreal, but it also forages on the ground. It is diurnal, though it has been observed mating late in the evening.

== Diet ==
Prey items of Philodryas olfersii include small rodents, lizards, amphibians, and birds, especially nestlings. They will also eat other snakes, including ones almost as large as themselves.

== Reproduction ==
Philodryas olfersii is oviparous. Each egg measures about 5 centimeters (about 2 inches). Clutch size is 4 to 11 eggs, with larger females producing more eggs than smaller females.

== Venom ==
Philodryas olfersii is a venomous snake, and there have been reports of serious bites causing local and systemic effects requiring medical treatment. The venom of P. olfersii is highly hemorrhagic, fibrinogenolytic, edematic, and has proteolytic activity 208% higher than Bothrops jararaca, in addition to containing neurotoxic properties. In mice, doses such as 5.6 μg / 20g resulted in neurotoxic effects, which included dyspnea, equilibrium alterations, posterior limbs paralysis, flaccid paralysis, and relaxation of the urinary sphincter. In laboratory mice, the venom of this species has an LD_{50} of 2.79 ± 0.58 mg / kg (intraperitoneal), equivalent to the lethality of Bothrops asper. However, due to the anatomy of their inoculating teeth located in the posterior region of the maxilla, these snakes have difficulty in inoculating venom, sometimes giving a "dry" bite. The most common symptoms are pain, swelling, erythema, and ecchymosis. There may be a pulsing sensation or numbness at the bite site. Some pus can develop and nearby lymph nodes may enlarge. Bruising or other discoloration can appear quite a distance from the wound site, sometimes occurring far up the arm after a hand wound, even progressing to the neck, chest, and abdomen. Stiffness may affect the entire limb. Patients complaining of snakebite may be given an antivenom for Bothrops snake venom, which is inappropriate for the treatment of Philodryas bites. Philodryas does not cause the coagulopathy that Bothrops does. Only one fatality has been reported, and that in a child.

The secretion that causes death to prey (or injury to bite victims) is produced in the snake's Duvernoy's gland at the rear of the mouth, and ”chewed” into its prey via a grooved tooth; this unique method of envenomation takes considerably more physical effort, from the snake, than it would with a more lethally venomous species (such as vipers, cobras, mambas, etc.). The majority of other venomous snakes will deliver one, swift bite of venom (via two frontal fangs, shaped like needles) before retreating and waiting for the venom to take effect on their prey in question. In the same way, a rear-fanged snake is less likely to bite a human, because it doesn’t view such a large potential predator as prey, and therefore is less inclined to exert the needed force to envenomate—this does not mean they will NOT bite, it is simply less common in rear-fanged snakes than other, more lethal, species. Nevertheless, their venom is myotoxic, causing muscle damage; muscle tissue hemorrhages and becomes necrotic. The secretion contains toxins such as serine proteases, metalloproteases, C-type lectins, cysteine-rich secretory proteins, and a C-type natriuretic peptide. Since Philodryas olfersii has difficulty in inoculating venom and produces small amounts of venom, accidents by this species are generally not serious, having a protein content of only 932 micrograms, and generally, 75 to 90% of the venom is composed of proteins. More recently, there was a severe case for this species, in which the victim let the snake bite for a long time, allowing it to inject a significant amount of venom. The symptoms started with a lot of swelling and bruises. The accident at first was not taken seriously as bites by Philodryas aren't serious in general. At the beginning, the victim only had pain and swelling. However, over time, the pain intensified, and the victim reported that she was in severe pain from the fingertip to the chest. Examinations showed that the venom caused clotting problems, affected liver enzymes and 50% of the liver. Swelling in the two arms was severe, with risk of thrombosis, and fasciotomy or even amputation was almost necessary.

== Parasites ==
Philodryas olfersii is host to a newly described species of parasitic protozoan, Caryospora olfersii. This snake has also been recorded carrying C. brasiliensis.

== Subspecies ==
Some sources do not recognize any subspecies of Philodryas olfersii. However, other sources recognize the following three subspecies, including the nominotypical subspecies:

- Philodryas olfersii herbeus (Wied, 1825)
- Philodryas olfersii latirostris (Cope, 1862)
- Philodryas olfersii olfersii (Lichtenstein, 1825)
