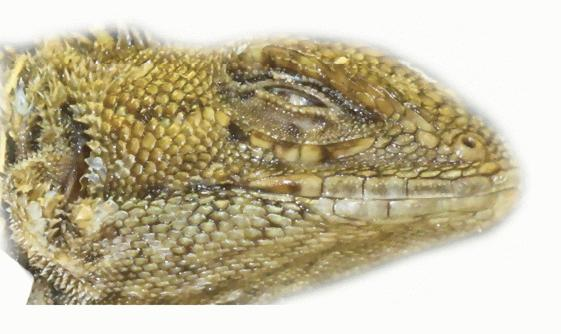

Scientific classification
- Kingdom: Animalia
- Phylum: Chordata
- Class: Reptilia
- Order: Squamata
- Suborder: Iguania
- Family: Tropiduridae
- Genus: Plica
- Species: P. medemi

Binomial name
- Plica medemi Murphy & Jowers, 2013

= Plica medemi =

Species of lizard

Plica medemi, Medem's treerunner, is a species of South American lizard in the family Tropiduridae. The species is found in Colombia.
