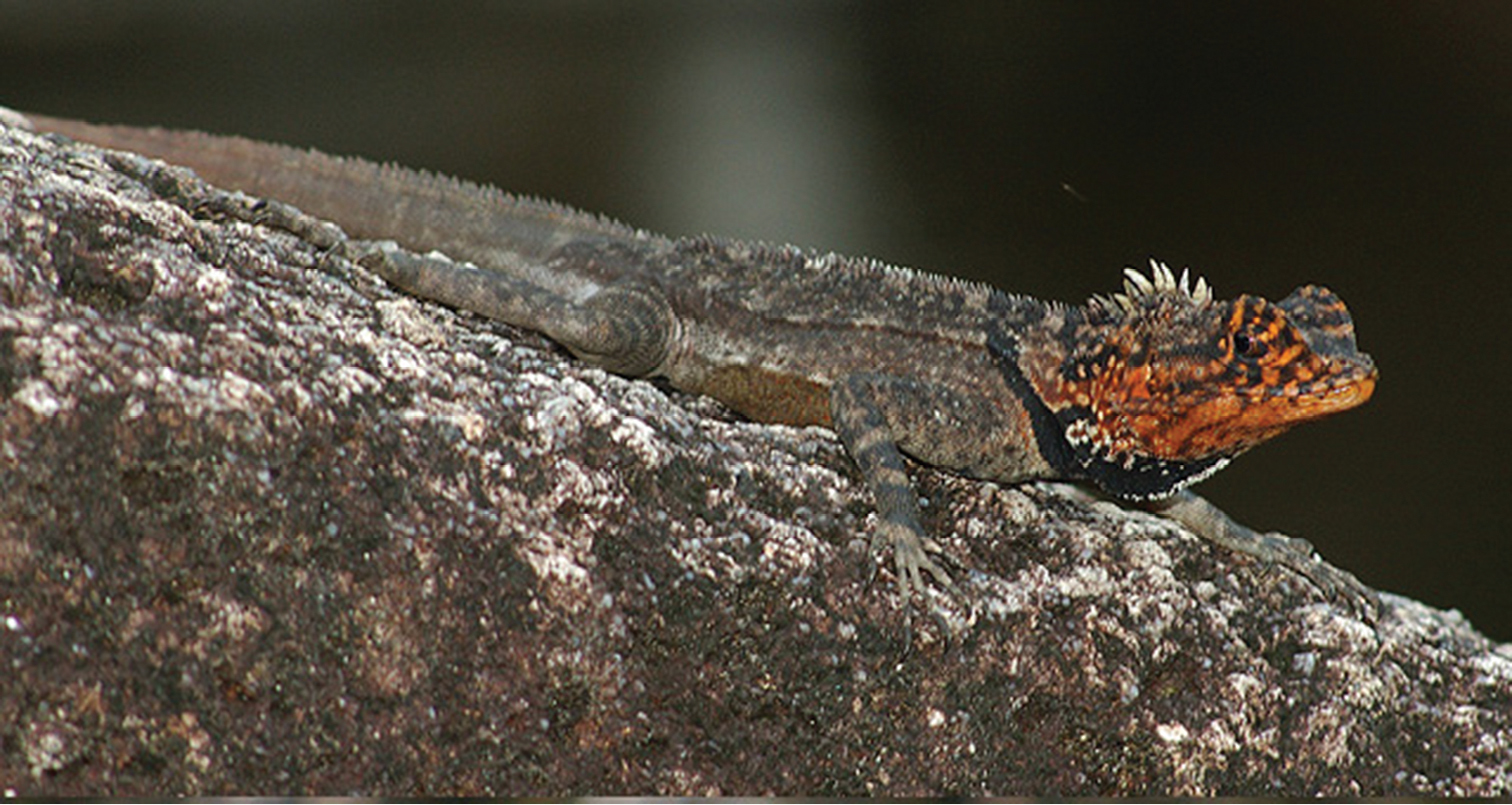

Scientific classification
- Kingdom: Animalia
- Phylum: Chordata
- Class: Reptilia
- Order: Squamata
- Suborder: Iguania
- Family: Tropiduridae
- Genus: Plica
- Species: P. rayi

Binomial name
- Plica rayi Murphy & Jowers, 2013

= Plica rayi =

Species of lizard

Ray's treerunner (Plica rayi) is a species of South American lizard in the family Tropiduridae. The species is found in Colombia and Venezuela.
