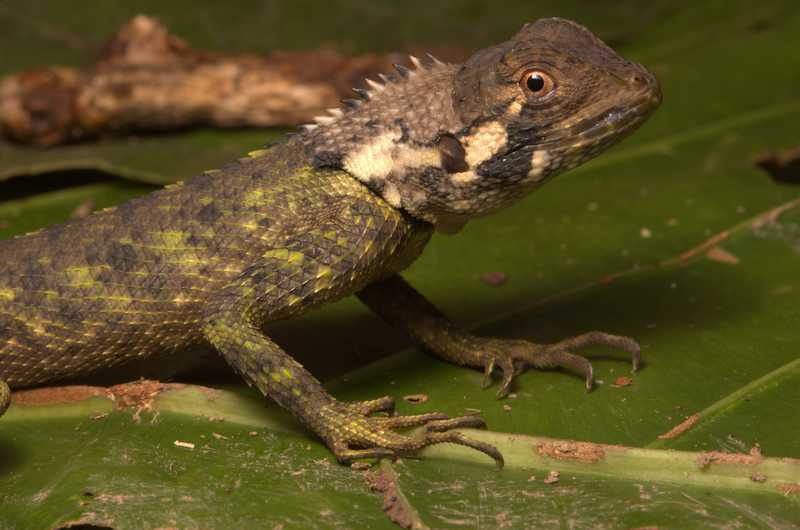
- Plica umbra

Scientific classification
- Kingdom: Animalia
- Phylum: Chordata
- Class: Reptilia
- Order: Squamata
- Suborder: Iguania
- Family: Tropiduridae
- Genus: Plica; Gray, 1831

Type species
- Draco plica Linnaeus, 1758

Species
- At least 8, see article.

= Plica (lizard) =

Genus of lizards

Plica is a genus of tropidurid lizards found in South America and the Caribbean. Species in the genus Plica are arboreal, medium-sized lizards.

== Taxonomy ==
For a long time, the genus Plica was considered to include four species: two relatively widespread ones (P. plica and P. umbra) and two tepuis-associated species with narrow distributions (P. lumaria and P. pansticta). However, recent research has shown that P. plica is a cryptic species complex, and four new species were described in 2013. The species count will likely increase as there are still several undescribed species.

== Species ==
The currently recognized species are the following:

- Plica lumaria Donnelly & C. Myers, 1991
- Plica pansticta (C. Myers & Donnelly, 2001)
- Plica plica (Linnaeus, 1758) – collared tree runner, tree runner
- Plica umbra (Linnaeus, 1758) – blue-lipped tree lizard, harlequin racerunner

Formerly included in Plica plica:

- Plica caribeana Murphy & Jowers, 2013 – Caribbean treerunner
- Plica kathleenae Murphy & Jowers, 2013 – Kathleen's treerunner
- Plica medemi Murphy & Jowers, 2013 – Medem's treerunner
- Plica rayi Murphy & Jowers, 2013 – Ray's treerunner

Nota bene: A binomial authority in parentheses indicates that the species was originally described in a genus other than Plica.
