= Arthrosaura versteegii =

Conservation status
- Least Concern (IUCN 3.1)

Scientific classification
- Kingdom: Animalia
- Phylum: Chordata
- Class: Reptilia
- Order: Squamata
- Family: Gymnophthalmidae
- Genus: Arthrosaura
- Species: A. versteegii

Binomial name
- Arthrosaura versteegii Lidth de Jeude, 1904

Synonyms
- Arthrosaura versteegii Lidth de Jeude, 1904; Artheosaura reticulata versteegii — Cunha, 1961; Arthrosaura versteegii — Cunha, 1967

Species of lizard

Arthrosaura versteegii is a species of lizard in the family Gymnophthalmidae. The species is indigenous to northeastern South America.

== Etymology ==
The specific name, versteegii, is in honor of Gerard Martinus Versteeg (1876–1943), who was a Dutch physician and explorer.

== Geographic range ==
A. versteegii is found in Brazil (Amazonas), French Guiana, Suriname, and Venezuela.

== Habitat ==
The preferred natural habitats of A. versteegii are forest and savanna, at altitudes of 100–1,400 m (330–4,590 ft).

== Reproduction ==
A. versteegii is oviparous.
