= Philodryas livida =

Conservation status
- Vulnerable (IUCN 3.1)

Scientific classification
- Kingdom: Animalia
- Phylum: Chordata
- Class: Reptilia
- Order: Squamata
- Suborder: Serpentes
- Family: Colubridae
- Genus: Philodryas
- Species: P. livida

Binomial name
- Philodryas livida (Amaral, 1923)

Species of snake

Philodryas livida is a species of snake of the family Colubridae.

== Geographic range ==
The snake is found in Brazil and Paraguay.
