= Pristimantis avius =

Conservation status
- Data Deficient (IUCN 3.1)

Scientific classification
- Kingdom: Animalia
- Phylum: Chordata
- Class: Amphibia
- Order: Anura
- Family: Strabomantidae
- Genus: Pristimantis
- Species: P. avius

Binomial name
- Pristimantis avius (Myers and Donnelly, 1997)

Synonyms
- Eleutherodactylus avius Myers and Donnelly, 1997

Species of amphibian

Pristimantis avius is a species of frog in the family Strabomantidae. It is endemic to Venezuela and currently only known from its type locality, the north base of Pico Tamacuari, in the Sierra Tapirapecó, Amazonas state.

== Etymology ==
The specific name avius is Latin adjective meaning "out of the way" or "remote". It refers to the remote type locality.

== Description ==
The type series consists of three adult males, two adult females, and three juveniles. The males measure 20–24 mm (0.79–0.94 in) and the females 31 and 33 mm (1.2 and 1.3 in) in snout–vent length. The head is as wide or wider than the body and wider than it is long. The snout is slightly rounded to truncate or bluntly pointed in dorsal view and rounded in lateral view. The tympanum is distinct and rounded or slightly oval. The fingers and toes have broad terminal discs but no webbing. Skin on the dorsum is tubercular. Dorsal color and pattern are very variable. The ground color varies from shades of orangish brown to brown or tan to greenish brown. Some specimens had a median and two dorso-lateral stripes that are grayish brown or brown and lack a dark inter-orbital bar. One specimen had a tan vertebral line that extended through the dark inter-orbital bar to the snout. The female holotype had vague blotches that became only noted after preservation. Two specimens had one or more chevrons. Juveniles and some adults had black scapular ridges. The flanks are always obliquely banded or mottled with grayish brown or brown on pale orangish brown. Ventral surfaces have yellow or orange coloring.

The male advertisement call is unknown. The female holotype (33 mm SVL) was found in amplexus with a much smaller male (20 mm SVL). Later on, the female laid 18 eggs measuring 4.5–5.0 mm (0.18–0.20 in) in diameter when the jelly coat is included, or 3.6–4.1 mm (0.14–0.16 in) with the yolk only.

Pristimantis avius is only known from the north base of Pico Tamacuari, in the Sierra Tapirapecó, Venezuela

== Habitat and conservation ==
The species' natural habitat is montane tepui forest at elevations of 1,160–1,460 m (3,810–4,790 ft) above sea level. It is a terrestrial and nocturnal species. Individuals have been found at night on low vegetation. No significant threats to this species are known. It occurs in the Parima Tapirapecó National Park.
