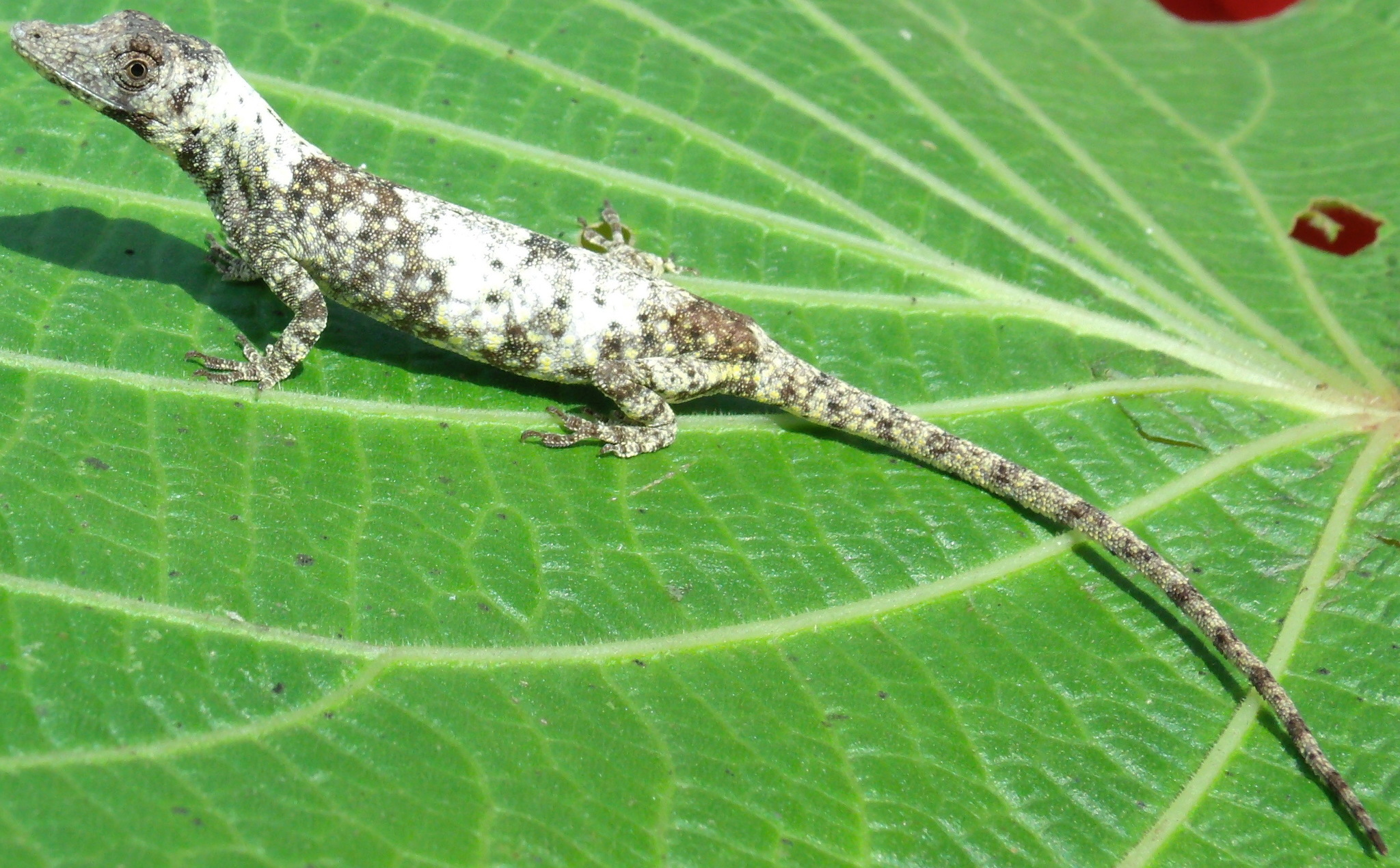

Conservation status
- Near Threatened (IUCN 3.1)

Scientific classification
- Kingdom: Animalia
- Phylum: Chordata
- Class: Reptilia
- Order: Squamata
- Suborder: Iguania
- Family: Anolidae
- Genus: Anolis
- Species: A. fungosus

Binomial name
- Anolis fungosus Myers, 1971

= Anolis fungosus =

Species of lizard

Anolis fungosus, Myers's anole, is a species of lizard in the family Dactyloidae. The species is found in Costa Rica and Panama.
