= Arthrosaura tyleri =

Conservation status
- Least Concern (IUCN 3.1)

Scientific classification
- Kingdom: Animalia
- Phylum: Chordata
- Class: Reptilia
- Order: Squamata
- Family: Gymnophthalmidae
- Genus: Arthrosaura
- Species: A. tyleri

Binomial name
- Arthrosaura tyleri (C. Burt & M. Burt, 1931)

Synonyms
- Pantodactylus tyleri C. Burt & M. Burt, 1931; Arthrosaura tyleri — Hoogmoed & Ávila-Pires, 1992

Species of lizard

Arthrosaura tyleri is a species of lizard in the family Gymnophthalmidae. The species is endemic to Venezuela.

== Etymology ==
The specific name, tyleri, is in honor of Sidney F. Tyler, Jr. (1850–1937), who as an American lawyer, banker, historian, and photographer.

== Geographic range ==
A. tyleri is only found on the summit of Cerro Duida in Amazonas state, Venezuela.

== Reproduction ==
A. tyleri is oviparous.
