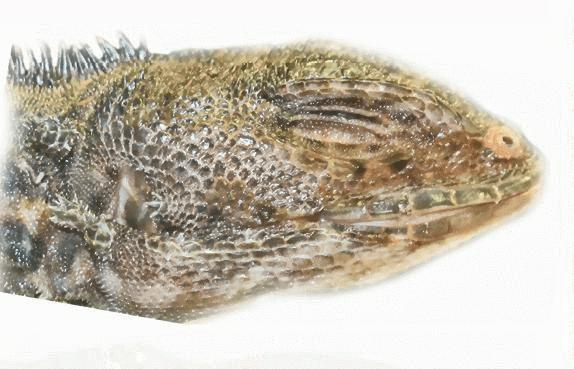

Scientific classification
- Kingdom: Animalia
- Phylum: Chordata
- Class: Reptilia
- Order: Squamata
- Suborder: Iguania
- Family: Tropiduridae
- Genus: Plica
- Species: P. kathleenae

Binomial name
- Plica kathleenae Murphy & Jowers, 2013

= Plica kathleenae =

Species of lizard

Plica kathleenae, Kathleen's treerunner, is a species of South American lizard in the family Tropiduridae. The species is found in Guyana.
