= Pristimantis cantitans =

Conservation status
- Near Threatened (IUCN 3.1)

Scientific classification
- Kingdom: Animalia
- Phylum: Chordata
- Class: Amphibia
- Order: Anura
- Family: Strabomantidae
- Genus: Pristimantis
- Species: P. cantitans

Binomial name
- Pristimantis cantitans (Myers and Donnelly, 1996)

Synonyms
- Eleutherodactylus cantitans Myers and Donnelly, 1996

Species of frog

Cerro Yaví

Pristimantis cantitans is a species of frog in the family Strabomantidae. It is endemic to Venezuela and only known from its type locality, the summit of Cerro Yaví (2,150 m (7,050 ft) above sea level), a sandstone table-top mountain (tepui) in the Amazonas State. The specific name cantitans alludes to the day-and-night calling behavior of this species and is derived from the Latin cantito (="to sing often").

== Description ==
Males measure 25–35 mm (0.98–1.38 in) and females 32–45 mm (1.3–1.8 in) in snout–vent length. The body is brown in color with some darker markings. Some individuals may have scattered yellow spots or a lighter brown dorsum with clear, wavy blackish brown markings. The dorsal skin is only weakly granular and rugose; ventral skin is areolate. The tympanum is distinct. The snout is rounded. The upper eyelids have small warts. The toes have weak lateral fringes and basal webbing while the fingers lack webbing.

The species is nocturnal but males call during both day and night from concealed sites in caves and from beneath thick moss mats growing over sandstone.

== Habitat and conservation ==
It has been collected on vegetation in montane tepui forest. No threats to this species are known.
