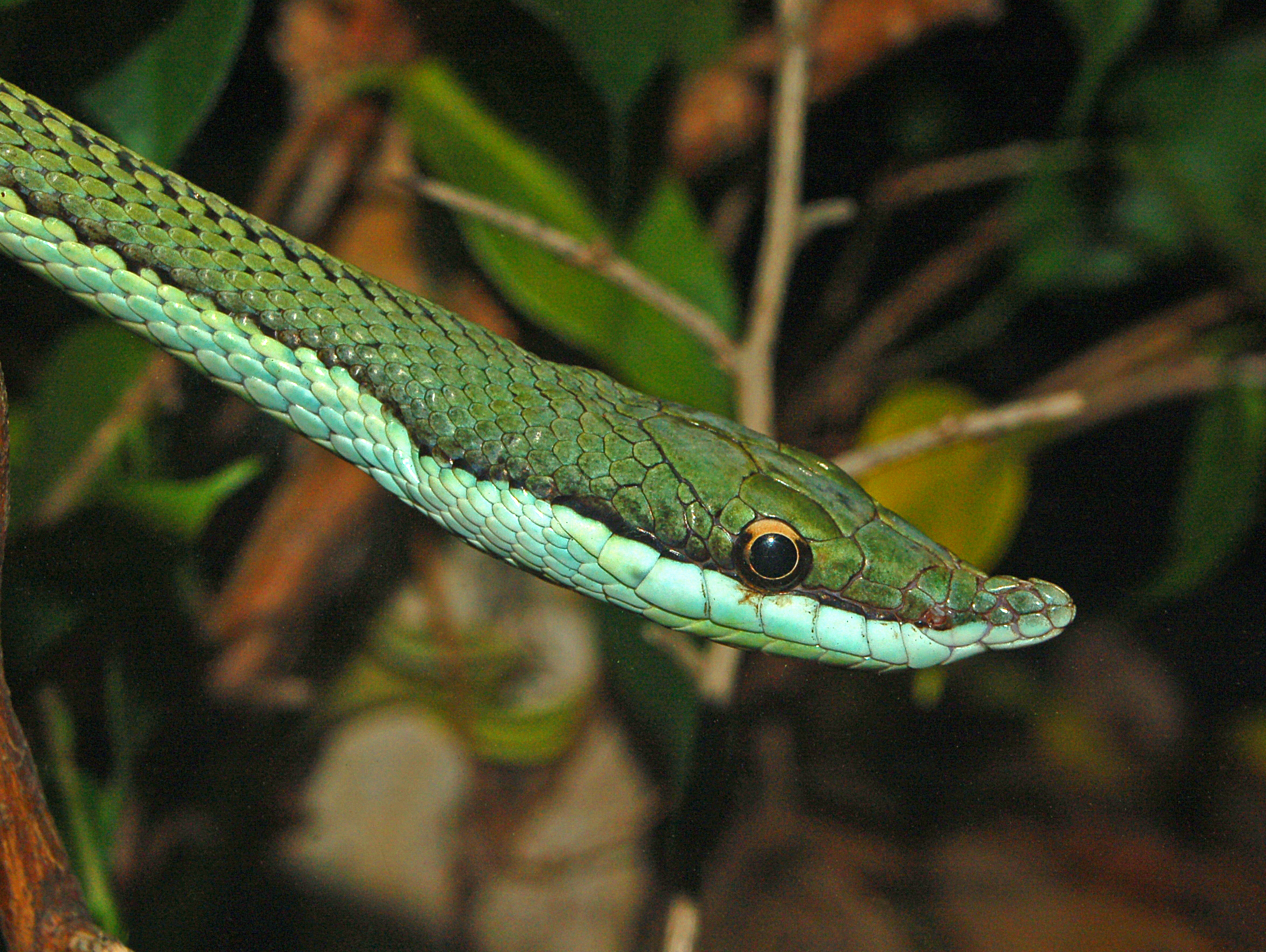
- Philodryas baroni

Conservation status
- Least Concern (IUCN 3.1)

Scientific classification
- Kingdom: Animalia
- Phylum: Chordata
- Class: Reptilia
- Order: Squamata
- Suborder: Serpentes
- Family: Colubridae
- Genus: Philodryas
- Species: P. baroni

Binomial name
- Philodryas baroni Berg, 1895

Synonyms
- Philodryas baroni Berg, 1895; Rhinodryas königi F. Werner, 1903; Philodryas baroni var. fusco-flavescens Serié, 1915; Chlorosoma baroni — Amaral, 1929; Philodryas baroni — J. Peters & Orejas-Miranda, 1970

= Philodryas baroni =

Species of snake

Philodryas baroni, common name Baron's green racer, is a species of rear-fanged venomous snake in the family Colubridae. The species is endemic to South America.

== Etymology ==
The Latin specific name, baroni, honors Manuel Barón Morlat, who collected the first specimens.

== Description ==
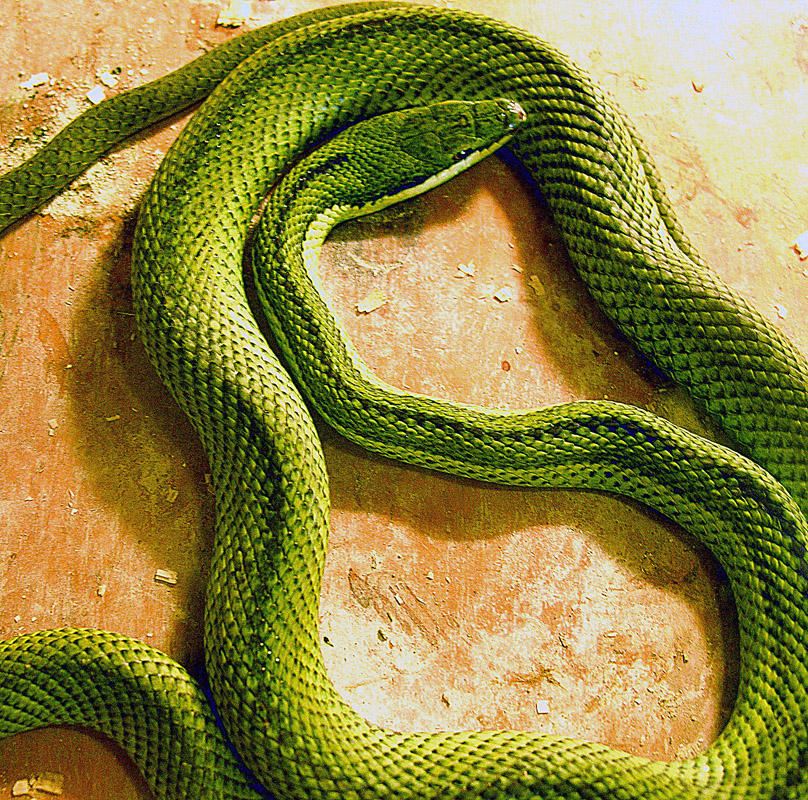
Centro Anaconda Serpentarium, Mendoza, Argentina

P. baroni can reach a total length (including tail) of about 150–180 centimetres (59–71 in).

The males are smaller than the females. The length of the tail is about 30% of the total body length. This species is the longest known in the genus Philodryas. The head is small and elongated, with an extension of the rostral scale, forming a small flexible nasal protuberance more developed in males. The coloration of the body is rather variable. Usually it is green, but there are found specimens tending to blue or brown. The pattern can be uniform or with black longitudinal stripes on the back and on the sides, on the anterior third of the body. The ventral area under the black lateral lines can be white or yellowish-white, sometimes with shades of green or blue.

== Behavior ==
P. baroni is a strictly arboreal snake, with an intense activity during the day. It is generally non-aggressive. If it is frightened, it emits a foul-smelling substance from the cloaca.

== Diet ==
P. baroni feeds on small rodents, small lizards, birds, and amphibians (such as arboreal frogs). Cannibalism of immature individuals by larger members of the species has also been reported.

== Venom ==
P. baroni is opisthoglyphous, i.e., equipped with rear fangs. It is venomous and should be treated with caution. A recent characterization of the venom of this species has shown that it has proteolytic activity, being able to inhibit platelet aggregation induced by collagen and thrombin formation. An intradermal injection in mice results in hemorrhage. When injected by the intramuscular route, it induces local effects such as hemorrhage, myonecrosis, edema and leukocyte infiltration, with a minimum hemorrhagic dose of 13.9 μg. Therefore, P. baroni must be considered dangerous to humans.

== Geographic range ==
P. baroni can be found in Argentina, Bolivia, and Paraguay.

== Habitat ==
P. baroni lives in forests and savannah woodlands.

== Reproduction ==
P. baroni is oviparous.
