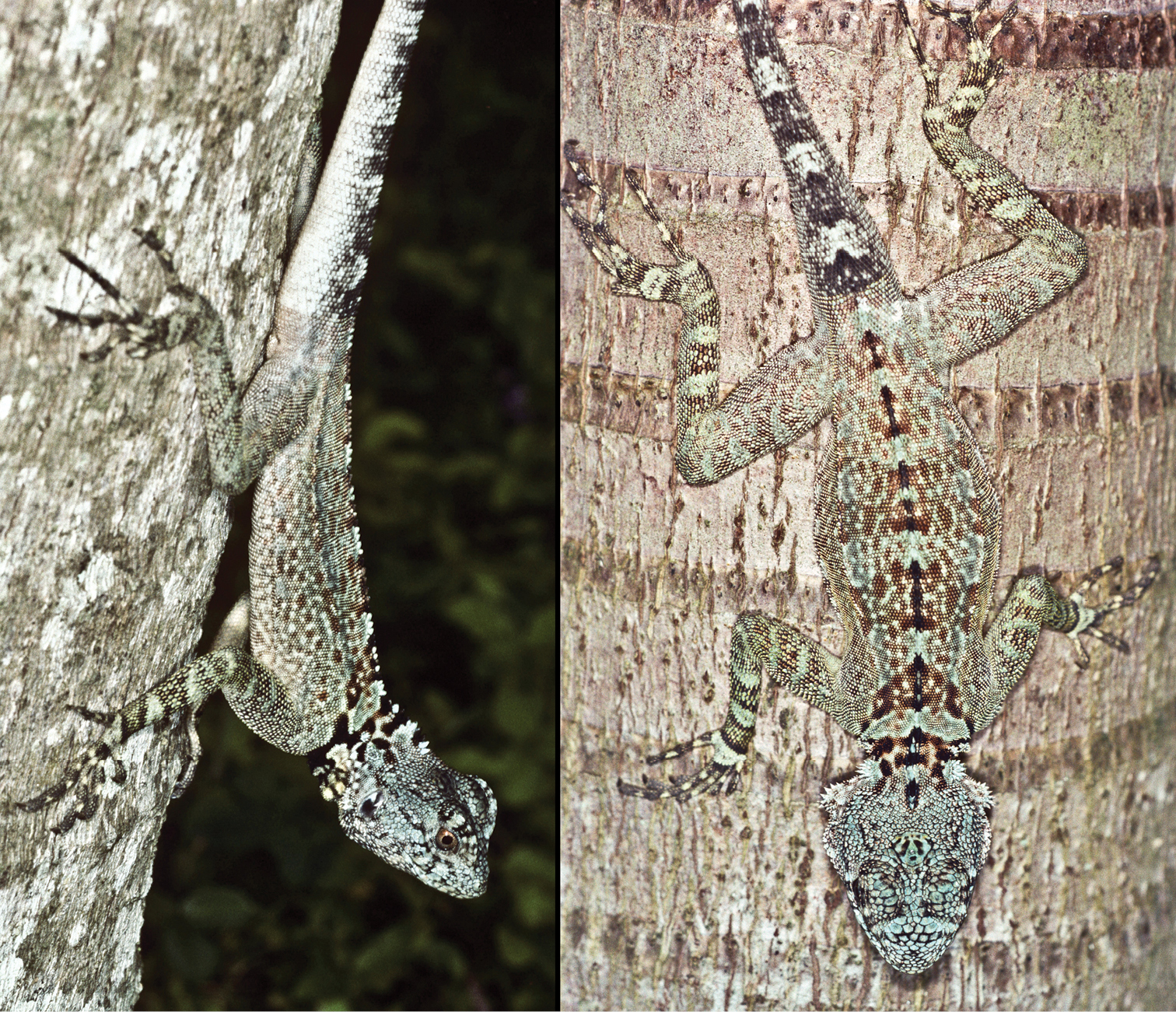

Scientific classification
- Kingdom: Animalia
- Phylum: Chordata
- Class: Reptilia
- Order: Squamata
- Suborder: Iguania
- Family: Tropiduridae
- Genus: Plica
- Species: P. caribeana

Binomial name
- Plica caribeana Murphy & Jowers, 2013

= Plica caribeana =

Species of lizard

Plica caribeana, the Caribbean treerunner, is a species of South American lizard in the family Tropiduridae. The species is found in Venezuela, Trinidad, Suriname and the Bocas Islands.
