= Pristimantis yaviensis =

Conservation status
- Near Threatened (IUCN 3.1)

Scientific classification
- Kingdom: Animalia
- Phylum: Chordata
- Class: Amphibia
- Order: Anura
- Family: Strabomantidae
- Genus: Pristimantis
- Species: P. yaviensis

Binomial name
- Pristimantis yaviensis (Myers and Donnelly, 1996)

Synonyms
- Eleutherodactylus yaviensis Myers and Donnelly, 1996

Species of frog

Cerro Yaví, the type locality

Pristimantis yaviensis is a species of frog in the family Strabomantidae. It is endemic to Venezuela and known from its type locality, the summit of Cerro Yaví (2,150 m (7,050 ft) above sea level), a sandstone table-top mountain (tepui), and from Cerro Yutajé (1,700 m (5,600 ft) above sea level), both in the Amazonas State. The specific name yaviensis refers to the type locality.

== Description ==
Males measure 18–21 mm (0.71–0.83 in) and females 24–30 mm (0.94–1.18 in) in snout–vent length. The coloration is variable; the dorsal ground color is light or dark brown, grayish brown, or orangish brown. Dorsal color patterns include dark chevrons, longitudinal dark lines, and sharply bicolor middorsum from the sides. The ventral surfaces are grayish, sometimes pale grayish yellow. The dorsal skin is finely granular to nearly smooth with scattered warts; ventral skin is areolate. The tympanum is absent. The snout is rounded, sometimes truncate in lateral profile. The upper eyelids have small flat tubercles. The fingers lack webbing but the toes have basal webbing; both fingers and toes have broad discs.

== Habitat and conservation ==
It has mostly been collected on vegetation in montane tepui forest or under rock slabs, although one specimen was observed in open, scrubby thicket about 1.5 m above ground. It the most common Pristimantis species on Cerro Yaví. No threats to this species are known.
