= Amphisbaena myersi =

Conservation status
- Data Deficient (IUCN 3.1)

Scientific classification
- Kingdom: Animalia
- Phylum: Chordata
- Class: Reptilia
- Order: Squamata
- Clade: Amphisbaenia
- Family: Amphisbaenidae
- Genus: Amphisbaena
- Species: A. myersi

Binomial name
- Amphisbaena myersi Hoogmoed, 1989

Species of amphisbaenian

Amphisbaena myersi is a species of amphisbaenian in the family Amphisbaenidae. The species is endemic to the Para district of Suriname. It is named after the American herpetologist Charles William Myers. It is small and long-tailed, with a cream-colored head and underside and brown back and upper surface of the tail. It has been classified as being data deficient by the IUCN due to pthe aucity of information about its range and population.

== Taxonomy ==
Amphisbaena myersi was formally described in 1989 based on a specimen collected near Jodensavanne in Suriname. The species is named after the American herpetologist Charles William Myers.

== Description ==
Amphisbaena myersi is a small, long-tailed worm-lizard. The head and underside are cream-colored, while the back and upper surface of the tail are brown. There is a cream-colored band across the tail, midway along its length.

== Distribution and habitat ==
Amphisbaena myersi has only been recorded from its type locality near Jodensavanne, in the Para district of Suriname. Surveys in parts of the rest of Suriname have been unsuccessful in documenting this amphisbaenian, suggesting that it may be extremely range-restricted. Although its habitat preferences have not been documented, its range lies in tropical rainforest.

== Conservation ==
Amphisbaena myersi has been classified as being data deficient by the IUCN as there is a paucity of information about the species' range and population. Although it does not occur in any protected areas, there is no serious threat facing the only locality it has been recorded from.
