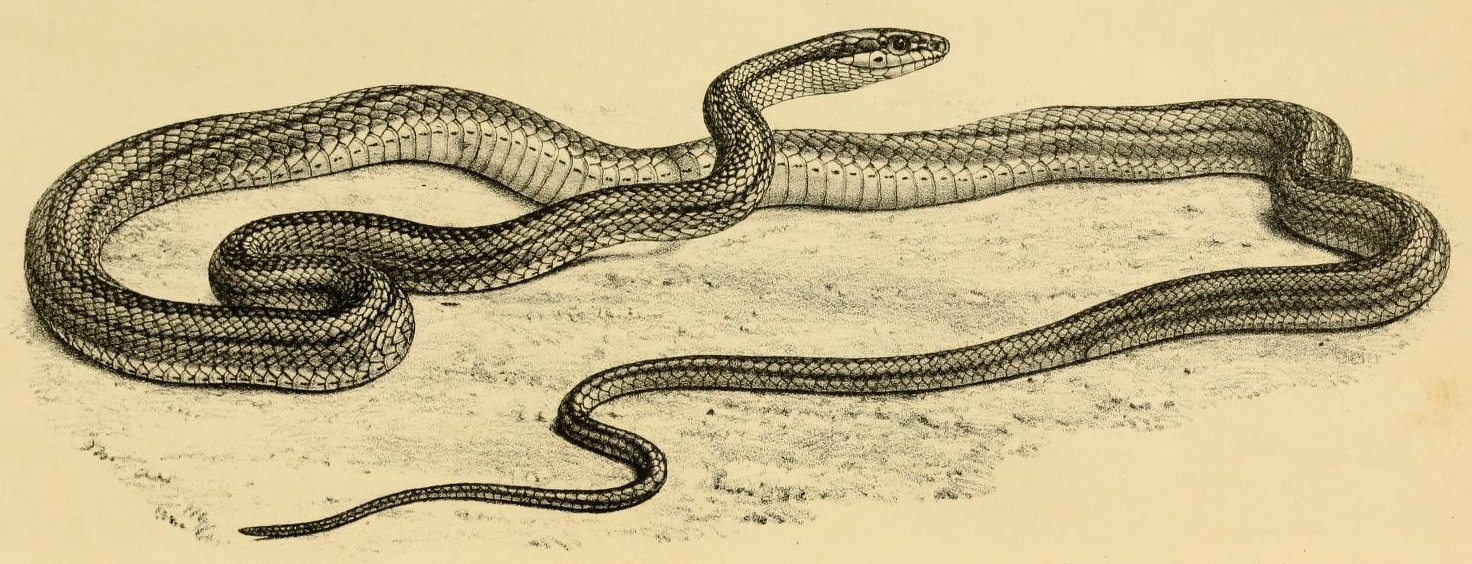

Conservation status
- Least Concern (IUCN 3.1)

Scientific classification
- Kingdom: Animalia
- Phylum: Chordata
- Class: Reptilia
- Order: Squamata
- Suborder: Serpentes
- Family: Colubridae
- Genus: Philodryas
- Species: P. psammophidea

Binomial name
- Philodryas psammophidea Günther, 1872

= Philodryas psammophidea =

Species of snake

Philodryas psammophidea, Günther's green racer, is a species of snake of the family Colubridae.

== Geographic range ==
The snake is found in Brazil, Bolivia, Paraguay, and Argentina.
