= Rheosaurus =

Conservation status
- Endangered (IUCN 3.1)

Scientific classification
- Kingdom: Animalia
- Phylum: Chordata
- Order: Squamata
- Family: Gymnophthalmidae
- Genus: Rheosaurus; Vásquez-Restrepo, Ibáñez, Sánchez-Pacheco, & Daza, 2019
- Species: R. sulcarostrum

Binomial name
- Rheosaurus sulcarostrum Donnelly, MacCulloch, Ugarte & Kizirian, 2006

Species of lizard

Rheosaurus sulcarostrum is a species of lizard in the family Gymnophthalmidae. The species is endemic to Guyana. It is monotypic in the genus Rheosaurus.

== Habitat ==
R. sulcarostrum is found in leaf litter on the floor of high-canopy rainforest.

== Geographic range ==
R. sulcarostrum has been found in northwestern Guyana at low elevation. Because of its secretive habitat, it is likely to be found elsewhere.
