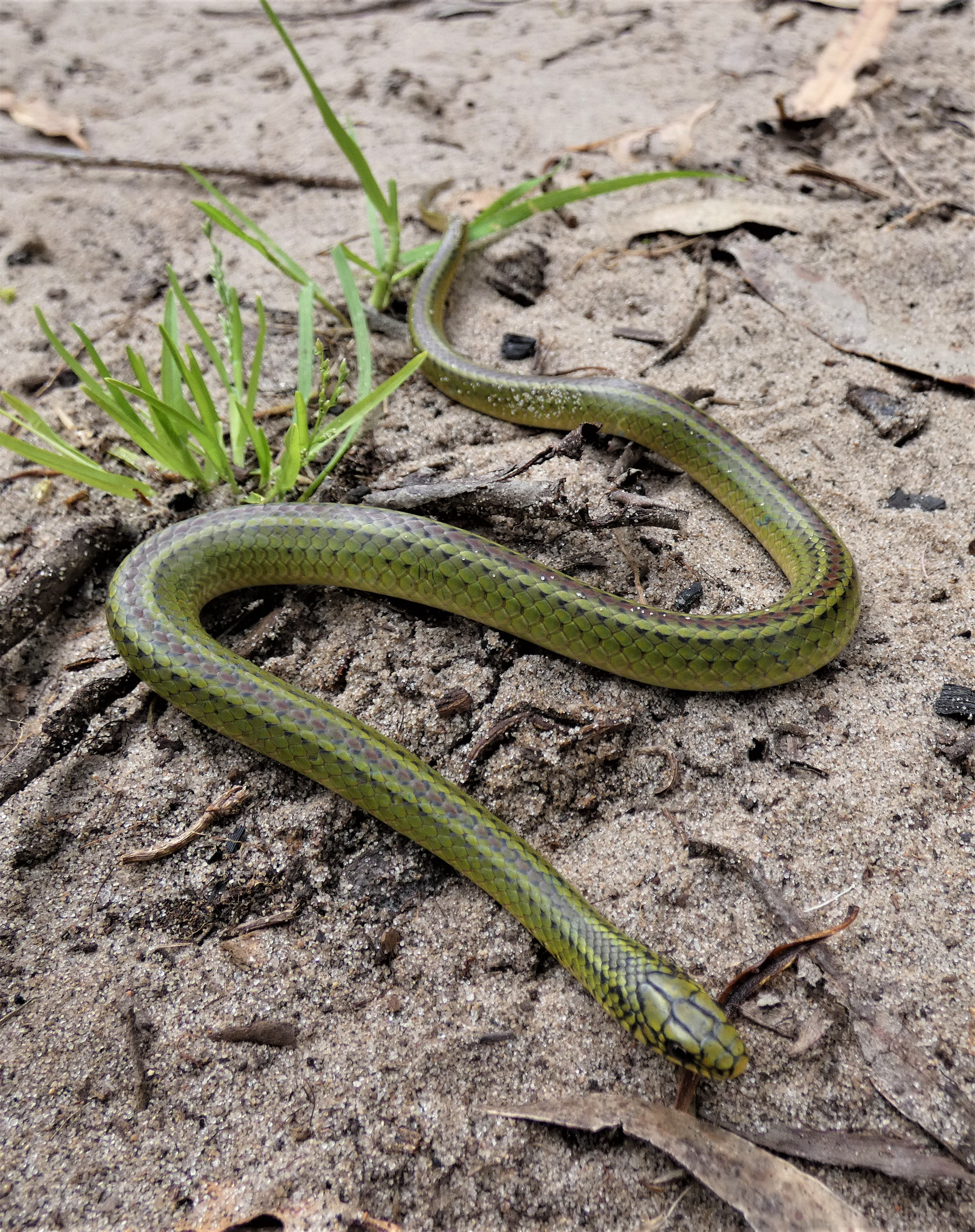

Conservation status
- Least Concern (IUCN 3.1)

Scientific classification
- Kingdom: Animalia
- Phylum: Chordata
- Class: Reptilia
- Order: Squamata
- Suborder: Serpentes
- Family: Colubridae
- Genus: Philodryas
- Species: P. agassizii

Binomial name
- Philodryas agassizii (Jan, 1863)

= Philodryas agassizii =

Species of snake

Philodryas agassizii, the burrowing night snake, is a South American species of snake in the family Colubridae.

== Distribution ==
The snake is found in Brazil, Argentina, Uruguay, and Paraguay.
