= Philodryas arnaldoi =

Conservation status
- Least Concern (IUCN 3.1)

Scientific classification
- Kingdom: Animalia
- Phylum: Chordata
- Class: Reptilia
- Order: Squamata
- Suborder: Serpentes
- Family: Colubridae
- Genus: Philodryas
- Species: P. arnaldoi

Binomial name
- Philodryas arnaldoi (Amaral, 1932)

Species of snake

Philodryas arnaldoi, Arnaldo's green racer, is a species of snake of the family Colubridae.

== Geographic range ==
The snake is found in Brazil.
