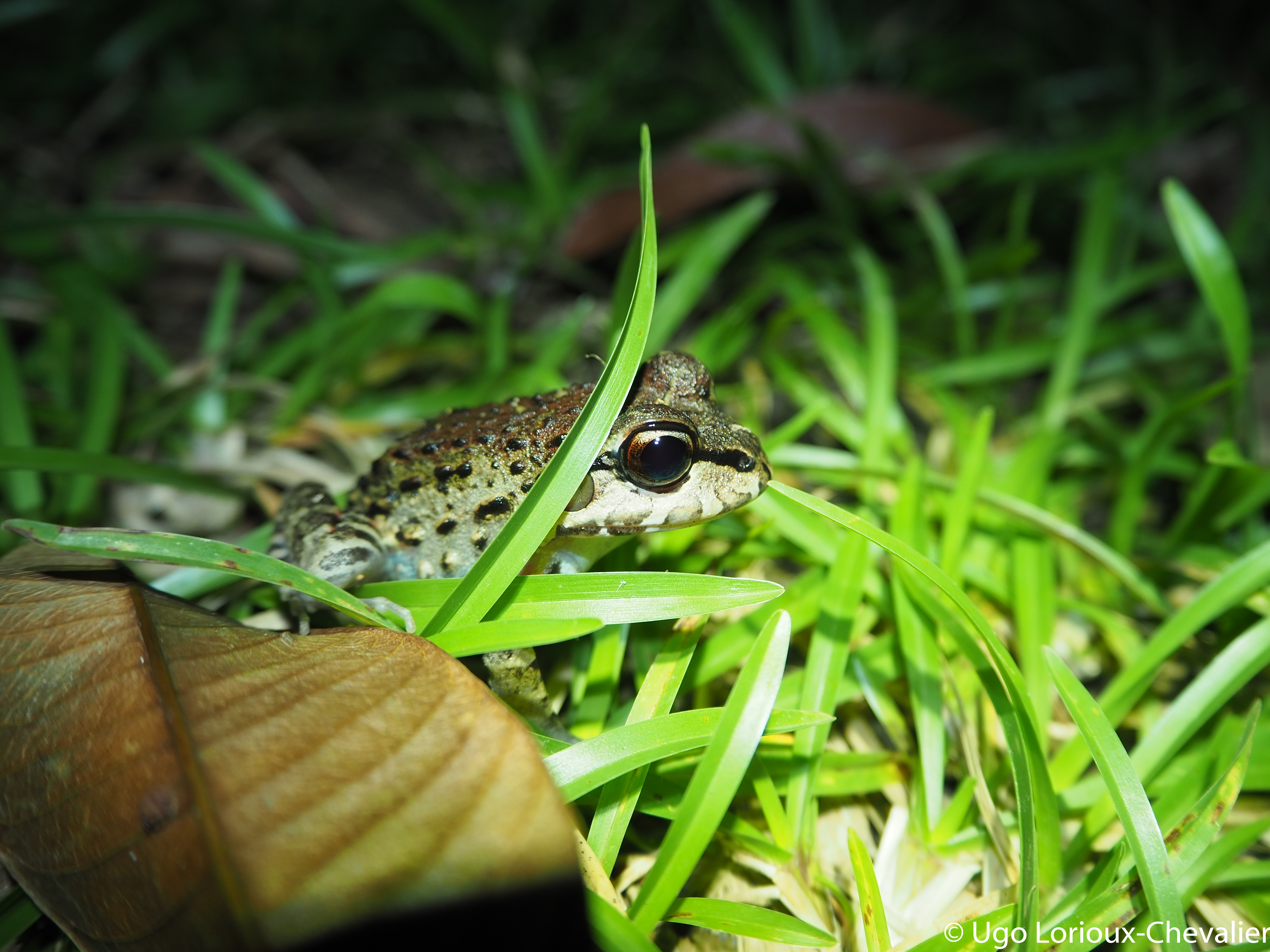

Conservation status
- Least Concern (IUCN 3.1)

Scientific classification
- Kingdom: Animalia
- Phylum: Chordata
- Class: Amphibia
- Order: Anura
- Family: Leptodactylidae
- Genus: Leptodactylus
- Species: L. myersi

Binomial name
- Leptodactylus myersi Heyer, 1995

= Leptodactylus myersi =

Species of frog

Leptodactylus myersi is a species of frog in the family Leptodactylidae. It is also known as Myers' ditch frog and Myers' white-lipped frog. It is found in Brazil, French Guiana, Suriname, and possibly Guyana.

== Habitat ==
This frog lives in rocky outcrops within rainforests. Scientists have seen it between 0 and 600 meters above sea level.

The frog's known range includes several protected areas, such as Estação Ecológica do Grão Pará and Reserva Extrativista do Rio Cajari.

== Reproduction ==
This frog makes a foam nest for its eggs. The tadpoles develop in riverlets that form during the rainy season.

== Threats ==
The IUCN and Venezuelan Fauna Red Book both classify this species as least concern of extinction.
