= Philodryas erlandi =

Scientific classification
- Kingdom: Animalia
- Phylum: Chordata
- Class: Reptilia
- Order: Squamata
- Suborder: Serpentes
- Family: Colubridae
- Genus: Philodryas
- Species: P. erlandi

Binomial name
- Philodryas erlandi Lönnberg, 1902

Species of snake

Philodryas erlandi, the Miranda green racer, is a species of snake of the family Colubridae.

== Geographic range ==
The snake is found in Paraguay, Bolivia, and Argentina.
