= Maureen A. Donnelly =

Tropical ecologist

Maureen Donnelly
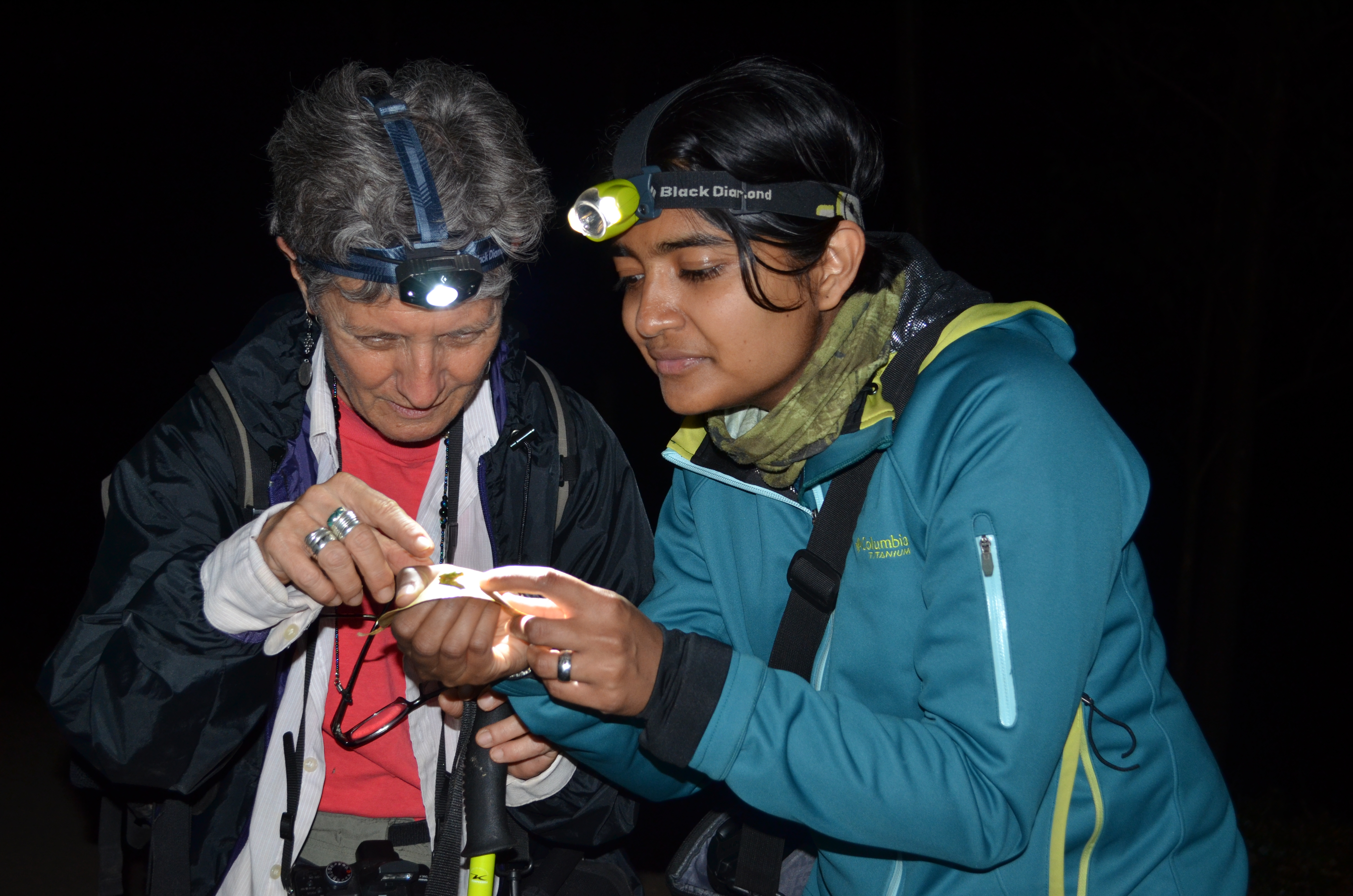
- Maureen Donnelly (left) with former doctoral student Lilly Margaret Eluvathingal Linden (right).
- Born: 1954 (age 71–72)
- Education: University of Miami (Ph.D., 1987) California State University, Fullerton (B.A., 1977)
- Scientific career
- Fields: Herpetology
- Workplaces: Florida International University
- Thesis: Territoriality in the poison-dart frog, Dendrobates pumilio (Anura: Dendrobatidae).
- Doctoral advisor: Jay M. Savage

Maureen Ann Donnelly (born 1954) is an American herpetologist based at Florida International University.

== Education and career ==
She received her B.A. degree from California State University, Fullerton in 1977 and graduated from the University of Miami with her doctorate degree in 1987. Following her Ph.D., she held postdoctoral positions at the American Museum of Natural History and the University of Miami. She joined the faculty of Florida International University in 1994 and, as of 2022, is a professor in the biological sciences department.

Donnelly served as president of the American Society of Ichthyologists and Herpetologists in 2016.

== Research ==
Donnelly's research focuses on the ecology, behavior, and conservation of tropical amphibians and reptiles. Donnelly's early research was on the use of space in the early development of tadpoles.

She has examined the loss of amphibians and reptiles, using Costa Rica as a model for global issues with biodiversity.

== Honors and awards ==
In 2017 Donnelly received the Robert K. Johnson Award for Excellence in Service from the American Society of Ichthyologists and Herpetologists.

== Selected publications ==
- Heyer, Ronald; Donnelly, Maureen A.; Foster, Mercedes; Mcdiarmid, Roy, eds. (2014). Measuring and Monitoring Biological Diversity: Standard Methods for Amphibians (1st ed.). Smithsonian Books.
- Saporito, Ralph A.; Garraffo, H. Martin; Donnelly, Maureen A.; Edwards, Adam L.; Longino, John T.; Daly, John W. (2004-05-25). "Formicine ants: An arthropod source for the pumiliotoxin alkaloids of dendrobatid poison frogs". Proceedings of the National Academy of Sciences. 101 (21): 8045–8050. doi:10.1073/pnas.0402365101. ISSN 0027-8424. PMC 419554. PMID 15128938.
- Whitfield, Steven M.; Bell, Kristen E.; Philippi, Thomas; Sasa, Mahmood; Bolaños, Federico; Chaves, Gerardo; Savage, Jay M.; Donnelly, Maureen A. (2007-05-15). "Amphibian and reptile declines over 35 years at La Selva, Costa Rica". Proceedings of the National Academy of Sciences. 104 (20): 8352–8356. Bibcode:2007PNAS..104.8352W. doi:10.1073/pnas.0611256104. ISSN 0027-8424. PMC 1895953. PMID 17449638.
- Donnelly, Maureen A.; Guyer, Craig (1994). "Patterns of reproduction and habitat use in an assemblage of Neotropical hylid frogs". Oecologia. 98 (3–4): 291–302. Bibcode:1994Oecol..98..291D. doi:10.1007/BF00324217. ISSN 0029-8549. PMID 28313905. S2CID 24931906.

== Taxa described ==
- Adercosaurus vixadnexus Myers & Donnelly, 2001
- Allobates undulatus (Myers & Donnelly, 2001)
- Anolis bellipeniculus (Myers & Donnelly, 1996)
- Anomaloglossus tamacuarensis (Myers & Donnelly, 1997)
- Arthrosaura montigena Myers & Donnelly, 2008
- Arthrosaura synaptolepis Donnelly, McDiarmid & Myers, 1992
- Atractus guerreroi Myers & Donnelly, 2008
- Bungarus slowinskii Kuch, Kizirian, Nguyen, Lawson, Donnelly & Mebs 2005
- Caecilita Wake & Donnelly, 2009
- Caecilita iwokramae Wake & Donnelly, 2009
- Ceuthomantis cavernibardus (Myers and Donnelly, 1997)
- Echinosaura sulcarostrum Donnelly, MacCulloch, Ugarte & Kizirian 2006
- Erythrolamprus torrenicola Donnelly & Myers, 1991
- Hypsiboas angelicus Myers & Donnelly, 2008
- Incilius majordomus Savage, Ugarte & Donnelly, 2013
- Microcaecilia savagei Donnelly & Wake, 2013
- Petracola waka Kizirian, Bayefsky-Anand, Eriksson, Minh & Donnelly, 2008
- Philodryas cordata Donnelly & Myers, 1991
- Plica lumaria Donnelly & Myers, 2001
- Plica pansticta (Myers & Donnelly, 2001)
- Pristimantis auricarens Myers & Donnelly, 2008
- Pristimantis avius (Myers & Donnelly, 1997)
- Pristimantis cantitans (Myers & Donnelly, 1996)
- Pristimantis memorans (Myers & Donnelly, 1997)
- Pristimantis pruinatus (Myers & Donnelly, 1996)
- Pristimantis yaviensis (Myers & Donnelly, 1996)
- Sphenomorphus rarus Myers & Donnelly, 1991
- Stefania tamacuarina Myers & Donnelly, 1997
- Thamnodynastes duida Myers & Donnelly, 1996
- Thamnodynastes yavi Myers & Donnelly, 1996
