= Duvernoy's gland =

Gland found in some groups of colubrid snakes

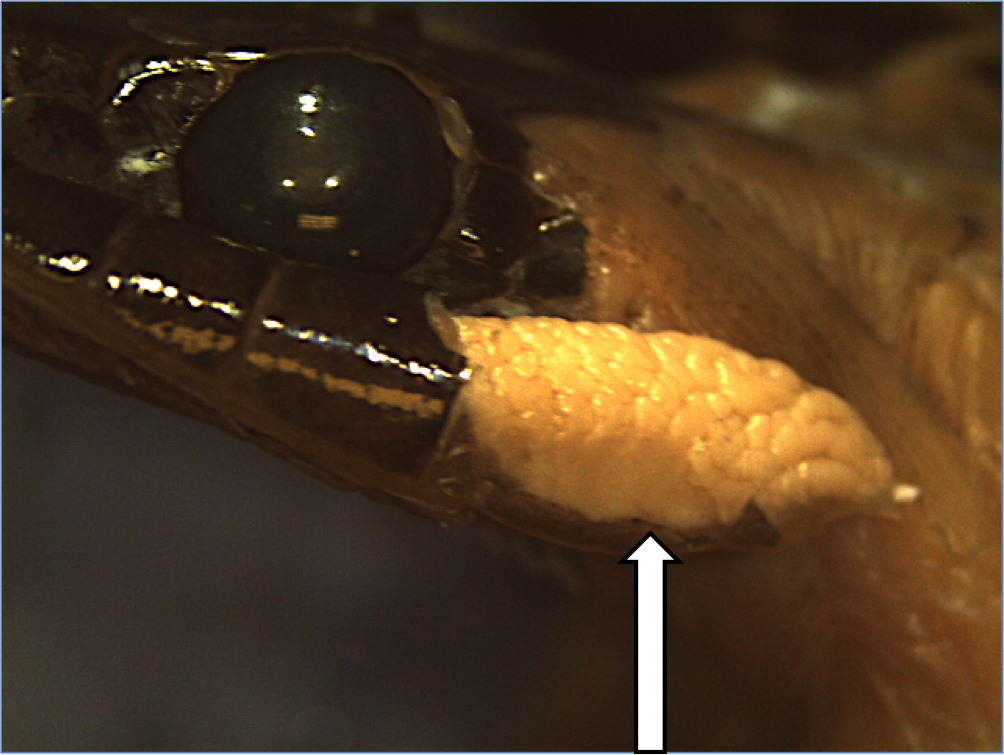
Duvernoy's gland (light yellow) on a garter snake from a lateral view. It is lateral to the mouth and caudal to the snake's eye. Partially covered in scales (greenish-brown) and surrounded by underlying muscle tissue (light brown)

The Duvernoy's gland is a gland found in some groups of colubrid snakes. It is distinguished from the venom gland and is not found in viperids or elapids. It was named for French zoologist Georges Louis Duvernoy who first described the gland in 1832.

The Duvernoy's gland is positioned posterior to the eye, encased in a thin cover of connective tissue, and consists mostly of serous cells. A single, short duct extends anteromedially from the lumen of the gland to the base of the posterior fangs.

== Function ==
The function of the Duvernoy's gland has been the source of much study and speculation, and debate is still ongoing. It is widely recognized that the Duvernoy's gland is the homologue of venom glands in vipers and elapids. However, the two types of glands are also “anatomically and functionally distinct,” leading experts such as Dr. Kenneth Kardong to maintain the distinction between the Duvernoy's gland and venom glands. Other scientists such as Dr. Bryan Fry maintain that the Duvernoy gland is a primitive version of a venom gland and should be referred to as such. Dr. Stephen Mackessy suggests Duvernoy's gland does secrete venom and is homologous to the venom gland found in front-fanged snakes.

Because the secretions of this gland are associated with the swallowing behavior of snakes, the Duvernoy's gland may play a role in swallowing and/or digestion. Kardong also notes that although some Duvernoy's gland secretions may be toxic and that they can produce pain, swelling, and other effects if injected subcutaneously; this does not make those secretions venoms.

== Evolution ==
The evolutionary path of these separate glands may come from “venom proteins” whose genes are widely expressed in tissues of both venomous and non-venomous snakes. These genes are over-expressed in the venom glands (including Duvernoy's gland), indicating the secretions from these glands evolved separately, rather than sequentially.
