= Charles William Myers =

American herpetologist (1936–2018)

- Born: March 4, 1936; St. Louis, Missouri, U.S.
- Died: September 4, 2018 (aged 82)
- Education: University of Florida (B.S.); Southern Illinois University Carbondale (M.A.); University of Kansas (Ph.D.)
- Known for: Systematics of Neotropical amphibians and reptiles
- Awards: Fellow of the American Association for the Advancement of Science
- Scientific career
- Fields: Herpetology
- Workplaces: American Museum of Natural History
- Doctoral advisor: William E. Duellman
- Author abbrev. (zoology): Myers

Charles William Myers (March 4, 1936 – September 4, 2018) was an American herpetologist. His research focused on the systematics of Neotropical amphibians and reptiles.

== Biography ==
In 1958, Myers became a research assistant at the University of Florida in Gainesville, where he received a Bachelor of Science degree in 1960. He obtained a Master of Arts at Southern Illinois University Carbondale in 1962. From 1964 to 1967 he was a visiting scientist at the Gorgas Memorial Laboratory in Panama. From 1968 to 1973 he was assistant curator at the American Museum of Natural History. In 1970, under the supervision of William E. Duellman (1930–2022), he received his Ph.D. in zoology from the University of Kansas. From 1973 to 1978 he was associate curator, and from 1978 to 1999 curator in the herpetology department of the American Museum of Natural History. From 1980 to 1987, and again from 1993 to 1999, he was chairman of the department. He retired in 1999 as curator emeritus.

Myers published numerous scientific papers on reptiles and amphibians of the Neotropics, including the 1976 study Preliminary evaluation of skin toxins and vocalizations in taxonomic and evolutionary studies of poison-dart frogs (Dendrobatidae), coauthored with John W. Daly. This study pioneered the discovery of more than 450 lipophilic alkaloids belonging to at least 24 major structural classes in the family of poison dart frogs (Dendrobatidae). In 2000 he published A history of herpetology at the American Museum of Natural History. He described about 34 new species of reptiles and several new frog species from Panama and South America.

In 1985 he was supervising curator of the photo exhibition Mountain of the Mist in the Akeley Gallery of the American Museum of Natural History, about a 1984 expedition to the tepui Cerro de la Neblina on the Venezuela–Brazil border, where several new frogs and reptiles were discovered.

Myers was a member of the American Society of Ichthyologists and Herpetologists, the Society for the Study of Amphibians and Reptiles, the Society for the History of Natural History, and a fellow of the American Association for the Advancement of Science.

== Eponymy ==
The following taxa are named after Myers: the reptile species Alopoglossus myersi, Amphisbaena myersi, Anolis charlesmyersi, Bothrocophias myersi, and Urotheca myersi; the amphibian species Allobates myersi, Pipa myersi, and Leptodactylus myersi; and the frog genus Myersiohyla.

== Taxa described by Myers ==
- Anolis fungosus
- Aromobates
- Aromobates nocturnus
- Atractus darienensis
- Atractus depressiocellus
- Atractus hostilitractus
- Atractus imperfectus
- Colostethus atopoglossus
- Colostethus lacrimosus
- Colostethus tamacuarensis
- Colostethus undulatus
- Coniophanes joanae
- Craugastor opimus
- Ctenophryne minor
- Dendrobates abditus
- Dendrobates arboreus
- Dendrobates bombetes
- Dendrobates captivus
- Dendrobates castaneoticus
- Dendrobates lehmanni
- Dendrobates mysteriosus
- Dendrobates occultator
- Dendrobates vanzolinii
- Dendrobates viridis
- Diploglossus montisilvestris
- Epipedobates
- Epipedobates andinus
- Epipedobates macero
- Epipedobates silverstonei
- Epipedobates simulans
- Geophis bellus
- Hyalinobatrachium crurifasciatum
- Hyalinobatrachium eccentricum
- Hypsiboas angelicus
- Imantodes phantasma
- Isthmohyla graceae
- Liophis problematicus
- Phyllobates terribilis
- Pristimantis auricarens
- Pristimantis avius
- Pristimantis cantitans
- Pristimantis cavernibardus
- Pristimantis memorans
- Pristimantis pruinatus
- Pristimantis yaviensis
- Rhadinaea bogertorum
- Rhadinaea cuneata
- Saphenophis sneiderni
- Stefania tamacuarina
- Strabomantis anatipes
- Strabomantis laticorpus
- Strabomantis zygodactylus

== Selected publications ==
- Myers, C.W. (2000). "A History of Herpetology at the American Museum of Natural History". Bulletin of the American Museum of Natural History (252): 1–232.
- Myers, C.W.; Donnelly, M.A. (2001). "Herpetofauna of the Yutajé-Corocoro massif, Venezuela: Second report from the Robert G. Goelet American Museum–Terramar Expedition to the northwestern tepuis". Bull. American Mus. Nat. Hist. (261): 1–85.
- Myers, C.W.; Donnelly, M.A.(2008). "The Summit Herpetofauna of Auyantepui, Venezuela: Report from the Robert G. Goelet American Museum–Terramar Expedition". Bull. American Mus. Nat. Hist. (308): 1–147.
- Myers, C.W.; McDowell, S.B. (2014). "New taxa and cryptic species of Neotropical snakes (Xenodontinae), with commentary on hemipenes as generic and specific characters". Bull. American Mus. Nat. Hist. (385): 1–112.
- Vanzolini, P.E.; Myers, C.W. (2015). "The herpetological collection of Maximilian, Prince of Wied (1782–1867), with special reference to Brazilian materials". Bull. American Mus. Nat. Hist. (395): 1–155.
