= Gurupi Biological Reserve =

Protected area in Brazil

- Reserva Biológica do Gurupi
- IUCN category Ia (strict nature reserve)
- Location within Brazil
- Coordinates: 3.761°S 46.749°W
- Area: 271,197 hectares (670,140 acres)
- Designation: biological reserve
- Created: 12 January 1988

Gurupi Biological Reserve (Portuguese: Reserva Biológica do Gurupi) is a biological reserve in the State of Maranhão, in Brazil.

== Location ==
The Gurupi Biological Reserve covers parts of the municipalities of Centro Novo do Maranhão and Bom Jardim in the state of Maranhão. It has an area of 271,197 hectares (670,140 acres). Elevations range from 27 to 316 metres (89 to 1,037 ft) above sea level. The reserve covers parts of the watersheds of the Gurupí and Pindaré rivers. Average annual rainfall is 2,169 millimetres (85.4 in). Temperatures range from 22 to 32 °C (72 to 90 °F) with an average of 27 °C (81 °F). The vegetation is dense Amazon rainforest within the Centro de Endemismos Belém ecoregion, and is rich in species of flora.

== History ==
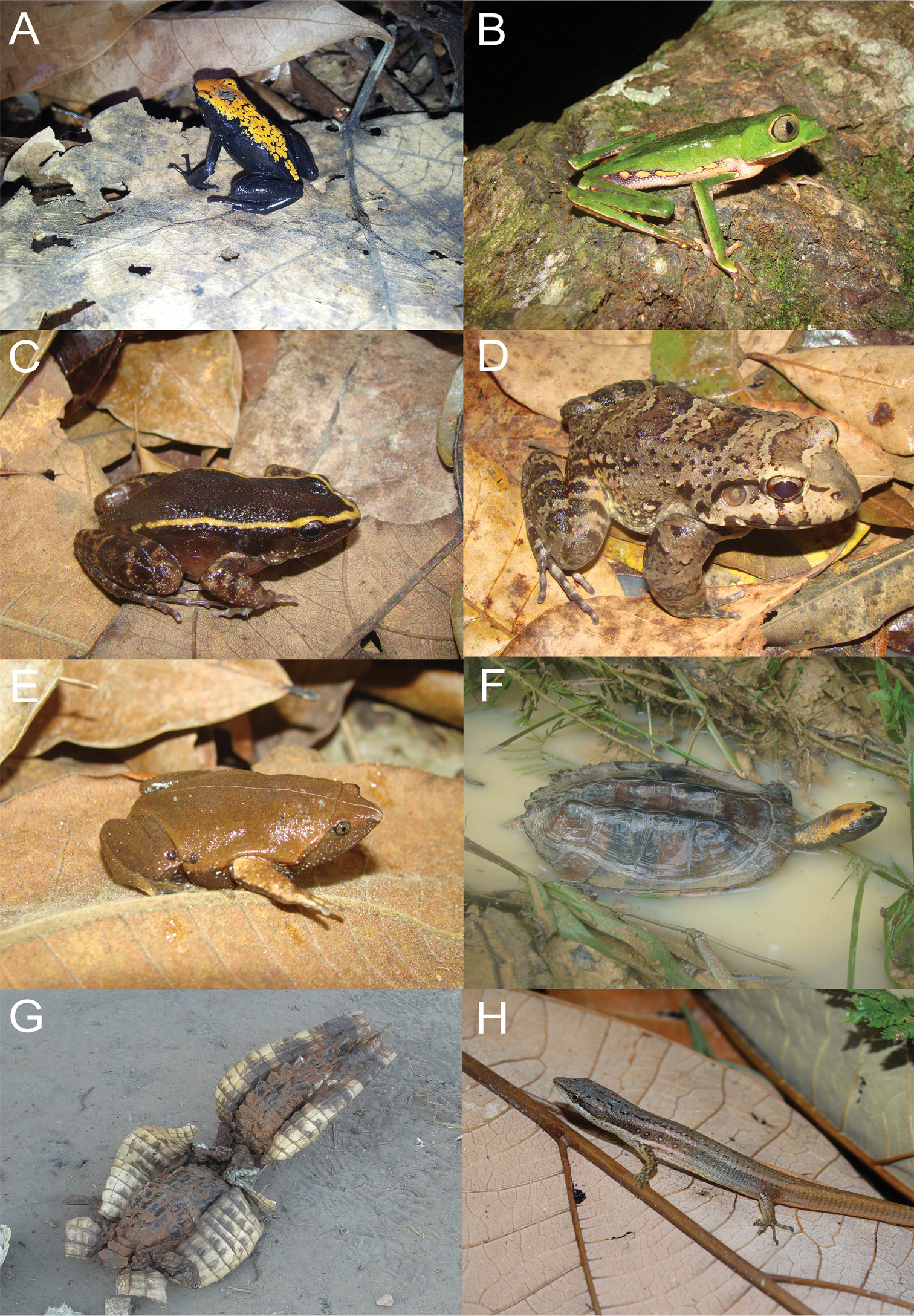
Amphibians and reptiles of the Gurupi Biological Reserve: (A) splash-backed poison frog, (B) white-lined leaf frog, (C) painted antnest frog, (D) Pará thin-toed frog , (E) brown egg frog, (F) twist-necked turtle, (G) smooth-fronted caiman, (H) elegant eyed lizard.

The Gurupi Biological Reserve was created on 12 January 1988. The reserve is administered by the Chico Mendes Institute for Biodiversity Conservation. The Biological Reserve is a "strict nature reserve" under IUCN protected area category Ia. The purpose is full preservation of biota and other natural attributes without human intervention. Specifically the reserve maintains a representative sample of the Amazon rainforest in Maranhão. The reserve is supported by the Amazon Region Protected Areas Program. The proposed South Amazon Ecological Corridor would link the reserve to other protected areas and indigenous territories in the region.

== Status ==
Studies with plants, butterflies and birds classify this biological reserve as one of the 12 pleistocenic refuges in the Brazilian Amazon rainforest. It has lost more than half of its forest due to logging since its creation. Protected species are Kaapori capuchin (Cebus kaapori), oncilla (Leopardus tigrinus), ocelot (Leopardus pardalis), jaguar (Panthera onca), Belem curassow (Crax pinima), Amazonian barred woodcreeper (Dendrocolaptes certhia), black-spotted bare-eye (Phlegopsis nigromaculata), red-necked aracari (Pteroglossus bitorquatus), dark-winged trumpeter (Psophia viridis) and pearly parakeet (Pyrrhura lepida).

== Sources ==
- Ayres, José Márcio; Da Fonseca, Gustavo A. B.; Rylands, Anthony B.; Queiroz, Helder L.; Pinto, Luiz Paulo; Masterson, Donald; Cavalcanti, Roberto B. (2005), Os Corredores Ecológicos das Florestas Tropicais do Brasil (PDF) (in Portuguese), Sociedade Civil Mamirauá, archived from the original (PDF) on 2016-07-31
- Chape, Stuart; Spalding, Mark; Jenkins, Martin (2008), The world's protected areas: status, values and prospects in the 21st century, University of California Press, ISBN 0-520-24660-8
- Full list: PAs supported by ARPA, ARPA
- Reserva Biológica do Gurupi (in Portuguese), Chico Mendes Institute for Biodiversity Conservation, archived from the original on 2015-04-15
- Unidade de Conservação: Reserva Biológica do Gurupi (in Portuguese), MMA: Ministério do Meio Ambiente
