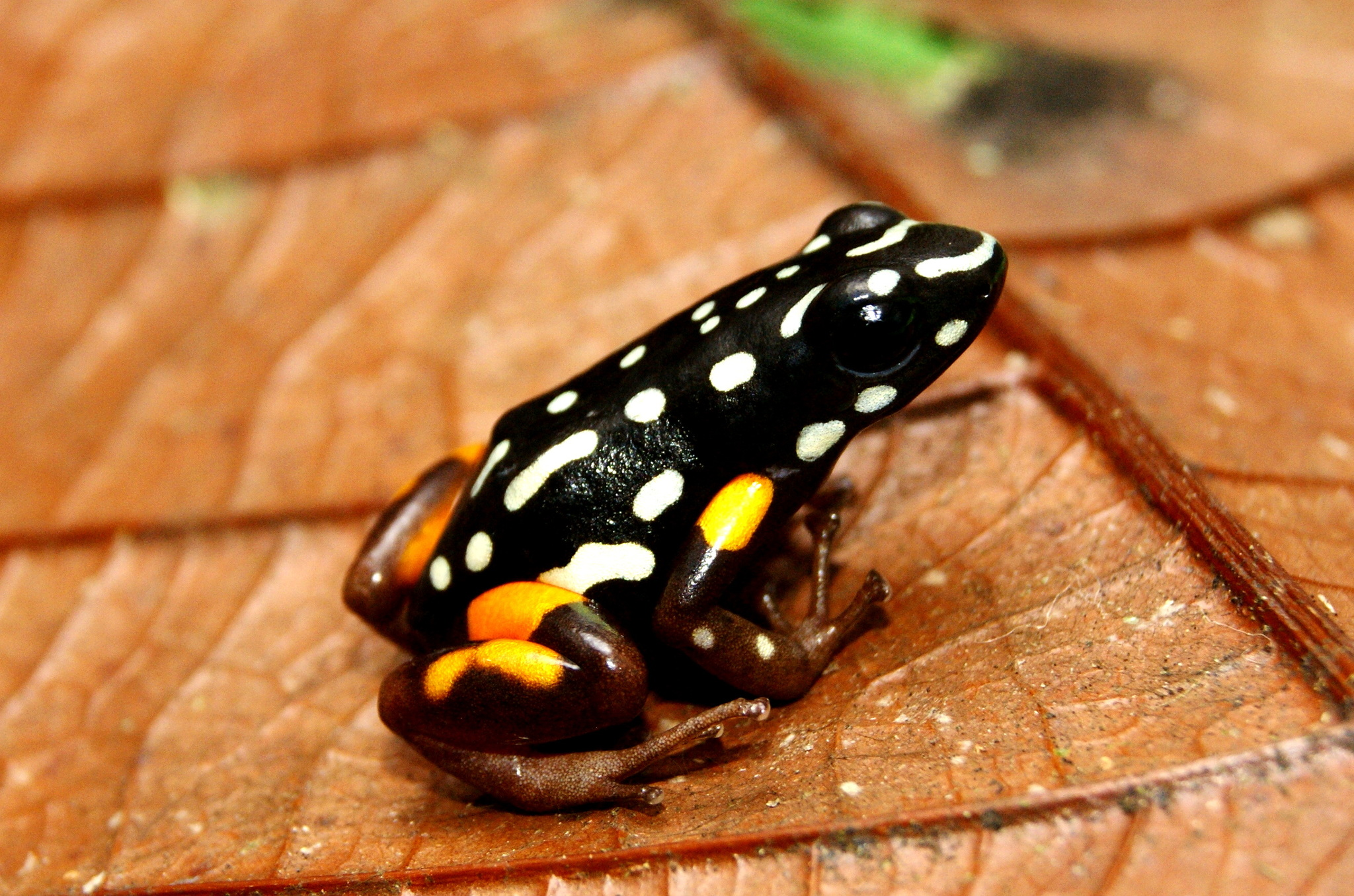

Conservation status
- Least Concern (IUCN 3.1)
- CITES Appendix II

Scientific classification
- Kingdom: Animalia
- Phylum: Chordata
- Class: Amphibia
- Order: Anura
- Family: Dendrobatidae
- Genus: Adelphobates
- Species: A. castaneoticus

Binomial name
- Adelphobates castaneoticus (Caldwell and Myers, 1990)
- Distribution of the Brazil-nut poison frog

Synonyms
- Dendrobates castaneoticus Caldwell and Myers, 1990

= Brazil-nut poison frog =

Species of amphibian

The Brazil-nut poison frog (Adelphobates castaneoticus) is a species of frog in the family Dendrobatidae. It is endemic to the state of Pará in Brazil. The frog is believed to have received its common name from the fact that its tadpoles sometimes develop in the hard capsules of the Brazil nut tree, which are common in its range. The nuts fall to the forest floor where they are broken open by agoutis and other animals seeking the seeds, and empty husks fill with water.

== Description ==
The Brazil-nut poison frog is a very small frog with a snout-to-vent length of 18 to 23 mm (0.7 to 0.9 in); females are usually larger than males. The dorsal surface is of a shiny black colour with spots and markings of white or various shades of yellow. There is a bright yellow or orange spot where the foreleg joins the body and two more similarly coloured spots on either side of the knee joint on the hind leg, which combine to make a single large spot when the animal is stationary. A further spot on the underside of the calf is only visible from below.

== Etymology ==
Scientists named this frog "Brazil-nut poison frog" because of its tendency to bring its tadpoles to the empty husks of Brazil nut fruits. Scientists have noted the multi-species interaction necessary for this breeding act. First, the tree must produce and shed the fruit. Then a mammal, such as an agouti, must eat the edible portion of the nut while leaving the husk behind. Then the husk must fill with rainwater. Then, insects, toads, and frogs deposit their larvae within the water. This creates a complex small ecosystem where larvae of many species, most capable of eating each other, must compete to survive. Scientists note that not only size but also the timing of deposition affects which species emerges from this situation alive.

== Distribution ==
The Brazil-nut poison frog is endemic to the rainforest of central Brazil. It is known from several localities in the state of Pará; from Cachoeira Juruá, Xingu River, the type locality; from Taperinha some 300 km (186 mi) to the north west; and from Flona Tapajos, Santarém. These locations are some distance apart and it is likely that this frog has a more widespread distribution than is known but has passed undetected in other parts of its range. It lives among the leaf litter on the forest floor and sometimes climbs into low vegetation.

== Biology ==
The Brazil-nut poison frog is diurnal and feeds on ants, termites and other small invertebrates. The eggs are laid on the ground where they are guarded by the male. When they hatch, it carries the tadpoles to temporary pools such as water holes in trees and stumps, and water-filled empty nut cases on the forest floor. Here the tadpoles develop rapidly, devouring mosquito larvae, smaller tadpoles, and other creatures that share these ephemeral pools, as well as suitably-sized plant material. This frog may become sexually mature in five to seven months.

== Status ==
The Brazil-nut poison frog is common within its range and the population trend seems stable, although data on its conservation status is somehow insufficient. As a result, the IUCN lists its conservation status as being of "least concern." The main threats it faces are logging, habitat destruction such as the conversion of forest to agricultural space, and wildfires. Scientists note that the animal appears on the international pet trade but do not know if this poses a threat to wild populations as of 2023. There are several conservation areas within its range. These include Floresta Nacional de Altamira, Floresta Nacional do Tapajós, Parque Estadual Cristalino II, Parque Nacional da Serra do Pardo, and Reserva Extrativista Riozinho do Anfrisio.
