= Bom Jardim =

Bom Jardim may refer to the following places in Brazil:

- Bom Jardim, Maranhão
- Bom Jardim, Pernambuco
- Bom Jardim, Rio de Janeiro
