= Egg frog =

Egg frog may refer to amphibians in two distinct genera:

- Ctenophryne Mocquard, 1904 [Central/South America]
- Leptodactylodon Andersson, 1903 [Africa]
