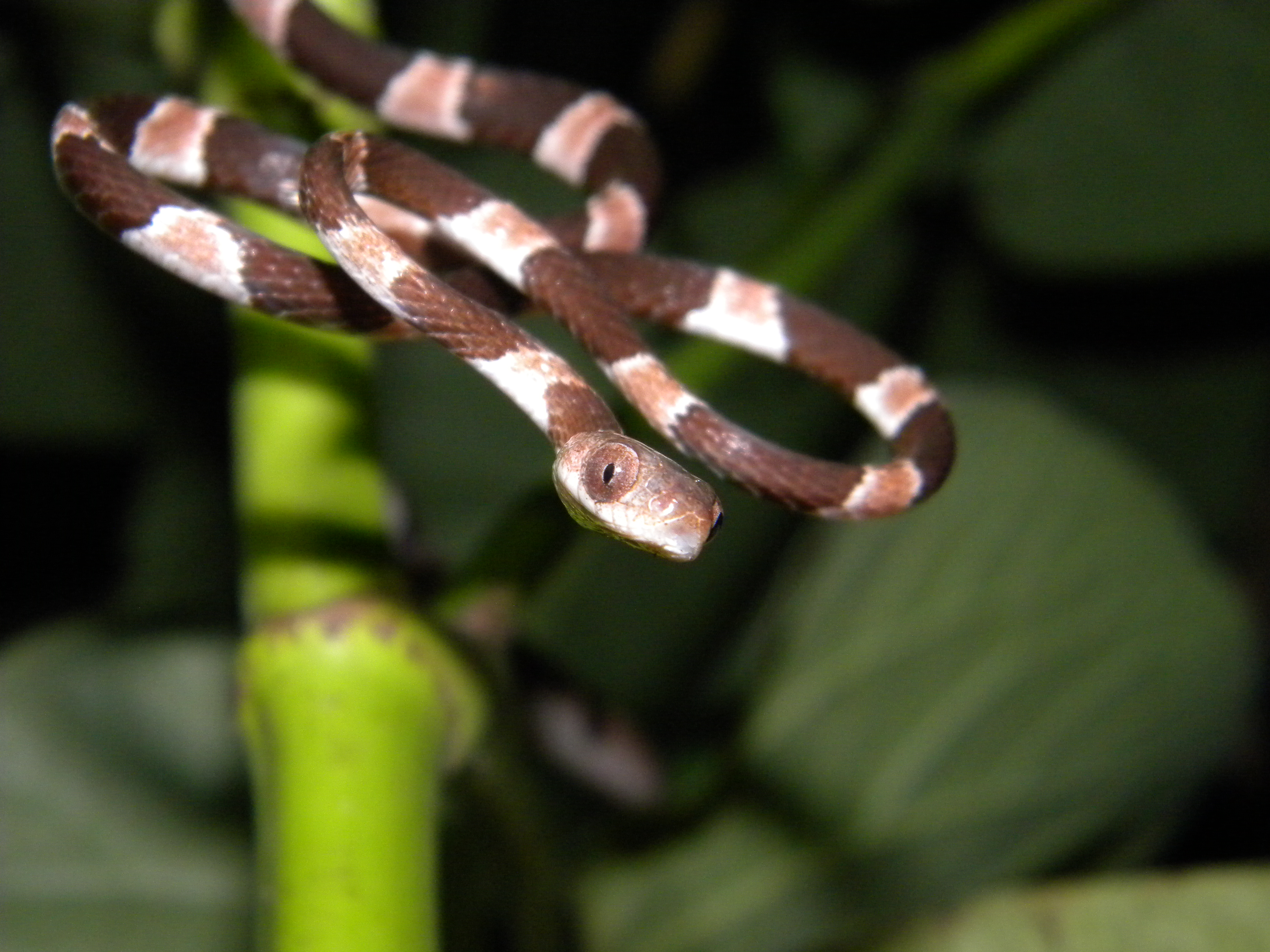

Conservation status
- Least Concern (IUCN 3.1)

Scientific classification
- Kingdom: Animalia
- Phylum: Chordata
- Class: Reptilia
- Order: Squamata
- Suborder: Serpentes
- Family: Colubridae
- Genus: Imantodes
- Species: I. tenuissimus

Binomial name
- Imantodes tenuissimus (Cope, 1867)

= Imantodes tenuissimus =

Species of snake

Imantodes tenuissimus, commonly known as the Yucatán blunthead snake, is a species of snake of the family Colubridae.

== Geographic range ==
The snake is found in Mexico.
