= Ctenophryne minor =

Conservation status
- Data Deficient (IUCN 3.1)

Scientific classification
- Kingdom: Animalia
- Phylum: Chordata
- Class: Amphibia
- Order: Anura
- Family: Microhylidae
- Genus: Ctenophryne
- Species: C. minor

Binomial name
- Ctenophryne minor Zweifel and Myers, 1989

Species of frog

Ctenophryne minor is a species of frog in the family Microhylidae. It is endemic to Colombia and only known from its type locality in the upper Río Saija drainage, Cauca Department. Common name Colombian egg frog has been coined for it.

== Description ==
The type series consists of one subadult female that measures 30 mm (1.2 in) in snout–vent length. The head is relatively narrow, barely narrower than the body. The snout is essentially rounded with slight indication of a blunt point when seen above and rounded and slightly projecting in lateral view. The canthus rostralis is rounded. The eyes are relatively small. There is no external sign of tympanum. The finger tips are rounded. The toes have flattened tips and are basally to one-half webbed. The coloration is grayish brown dorsally and black laterally, with a pinkish line that extends from the groin to above the eye and onto the canthus rostralis separating them. The dorsum has a few, scattered blotches of paler brown, a few scattered white dots middorsally, and sparse pale blue speckling dorsolaterally. The ventral surfaces are black with some very pale blue spots.

Ctenophryne minor is only known from the upper Río Saija drainage, Cauca Department

== Habitat and conservation ==
Ctenophryne minor is known from humid tropical forest at about 100–200 m (330–660 ft) above sea level. It is a leaf litter species. Males calls from beneath leaf litter and from leaf-litter covered holes in the ground. No major threats to this species have been identified because it occurs in an area of little human impact. It is a rare, secretive species that might occur more widely than currently known.
