= Imantodes phantasma =

Conservation status
- Data Deficient (IUCN 3.1)

Scientific classification
- Kingdom: Animalia
- Phylum: Chordata
- Class: Reptilia
- Order: Squamata
- Suborder: Serpentes
- Family: Colubridae
- Genus: Imantodes
- Species: I. phantasma

Binomial name
- Imantodes phantasma C. Myers, 1982

Species of snake

Imantodes phantasma, the phantasma tree snake is a species of snake in the family Colubridae. The species is native to Panama and Colombia.
