= Ctenophryne carpish =

Conservation status
- Endangered (IUCN 3.1)

Scientific classification
- Kingdom: Animalia
- Phylum: Chordata
- Class: Amphibia
- Order: Anura
- Family: Microhylidae
- Genus: Ctenophryne
- Species: C. carpish

Binomial name
- Ctenophryne carpish (Lehr, Rodríguez, and Córdova, 2002)

Synonyms
- Phrynopus carpish Lehr, Rodríguez, and Córdova, 2002; Melanophryne carpish (Lehr, Rodríguez, and Córdova, 2002)

Species of amphibian

Ctenophryne carpish is a rare and little-known species of microhylid frogs endemic to Peru. It is known from its type locality on the Cordillera de Carpish, Huánuco, and from near Juanjuí in the San Martín Region. It lacks eardrums, and at a cursory glance it resembles leptodactylid frogs of the genus Phrynopus, in which it was initially placed.

== Habitat and conservation ==
Male Ctenophryne carpish measure 29 mm (1.1 in) (based on a single specimen) and females 34–35 mm (1.3–1.4 in) in snout–vent length. The body is stout and the head is short. The eyes are large. The tympanum is absent, as is tympanic annulus and stapes. Dorsal skin is smooth in females but finely areolate in males. The dorsum is black with green blotches. The venter is black but there are orange blotches on throat and chest. The tips of digits are slightly swollen. The toes have basal webbing and lateral fringes.

== Habitat and conservation ==
Natural habitat of Ctenophryne carpish is cloud forest at elevations of 2,750–2,960 m (9,020–9,710 ft) above sea level. It lives on the ground or in bromeliads on or near the ground; it uses bromeliads for breeding. The diet consists of arthropods.

Ctenophryne carpish is a rare or secretive species, possibly both. It is threatened by habitat destruction caused by agricultural expansion and firewood collection.
