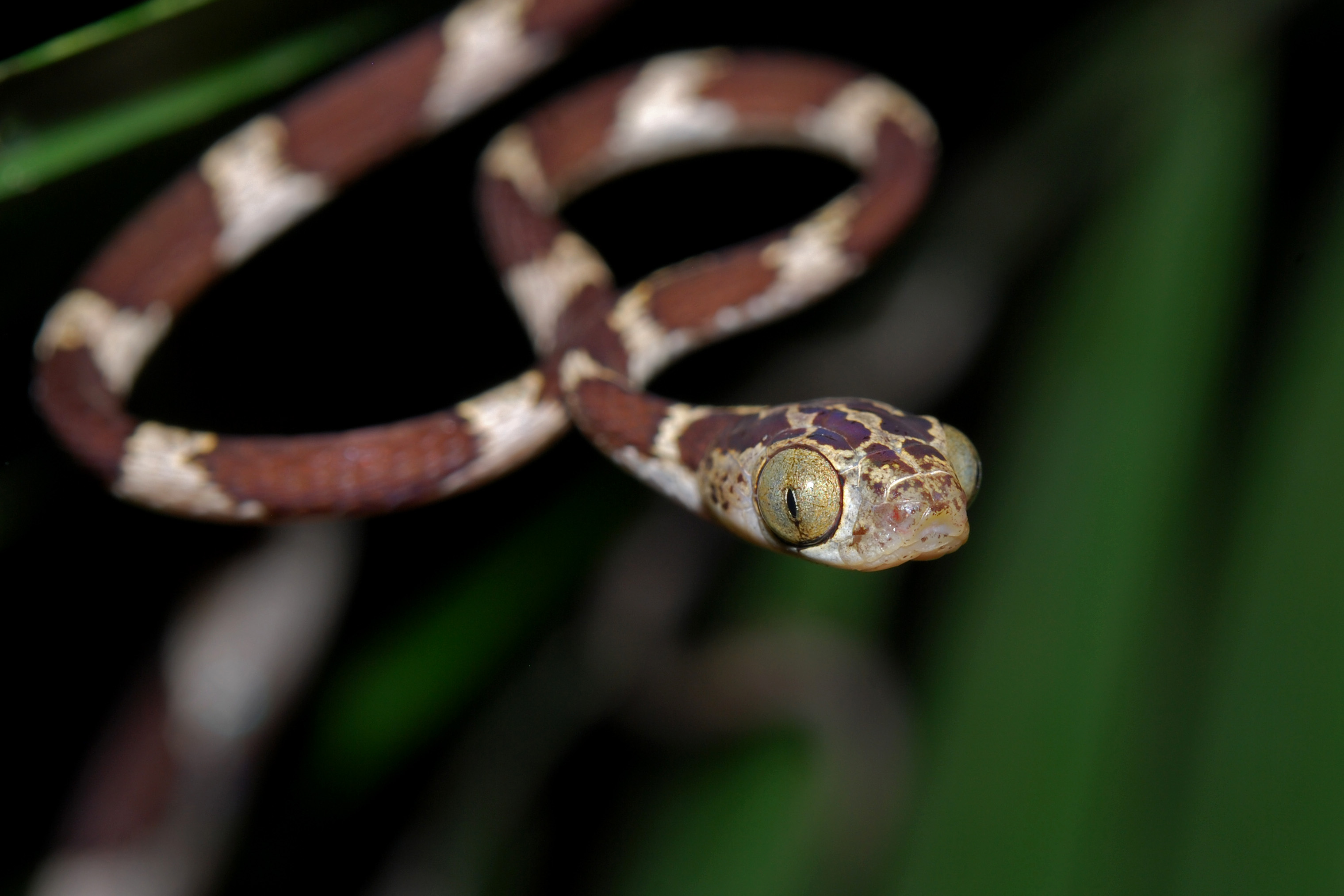
- Imantodes cenchoa

Scientific classification
- Kingdom: Animalia
- Phylum: Chordata
- Class: Reptilia
- Order: Squamata
- Suborder: Serpentes
- Family: Colubridae
- Subfamily: Dipsadinae
- Genus: Imantodes; A.M.C. Duméril, 1853

= Imantodes =

Genus of snakes

Imantodes is a genus of snakes, commonly referred to as blunt-headed tree snakes or blunt-headed vine snakes, in the subfamily Dipsadinae of the family Colubridae. The genus consists of eight species that are native to Mexico, Central America, and the northern part of South America.

== Species ==
The following eight species are recognized as being valid.

- Imantodes cenchoa (Linnaeus, 1758) – neotropical blunt-headed treesnake, blunthead treesnake, fiddle-string snake
- Imantodes chocoensis Torres-Carvajal, Yánez-Muñoz, Quirola, E.N. Smith & Almendáriz, 2012 – Chocoan blunt-headed vine snake
- Imantodes gemmistratus (Cope, 1861) – Central American tree snake
- Imantodes guane Missassi & Prudente, 2015
- Imantodes inornatus (Boulenger, 1896) – western tree snake
- Imantodes lentiferus (Cope, 1894) – Amazon Basin tree snake
- Imantodes phantasma C. Myers, 1982 – phantasma tree snake
- Imantodes tenuissimus (Cope, 1867) – Yucatán blunthead snake

Nota bene: A binomial authority in parentheses indicates that the species was originally described in a genus other than Imantodes.
