= Centro Novo do Maranhão =

- Municipality
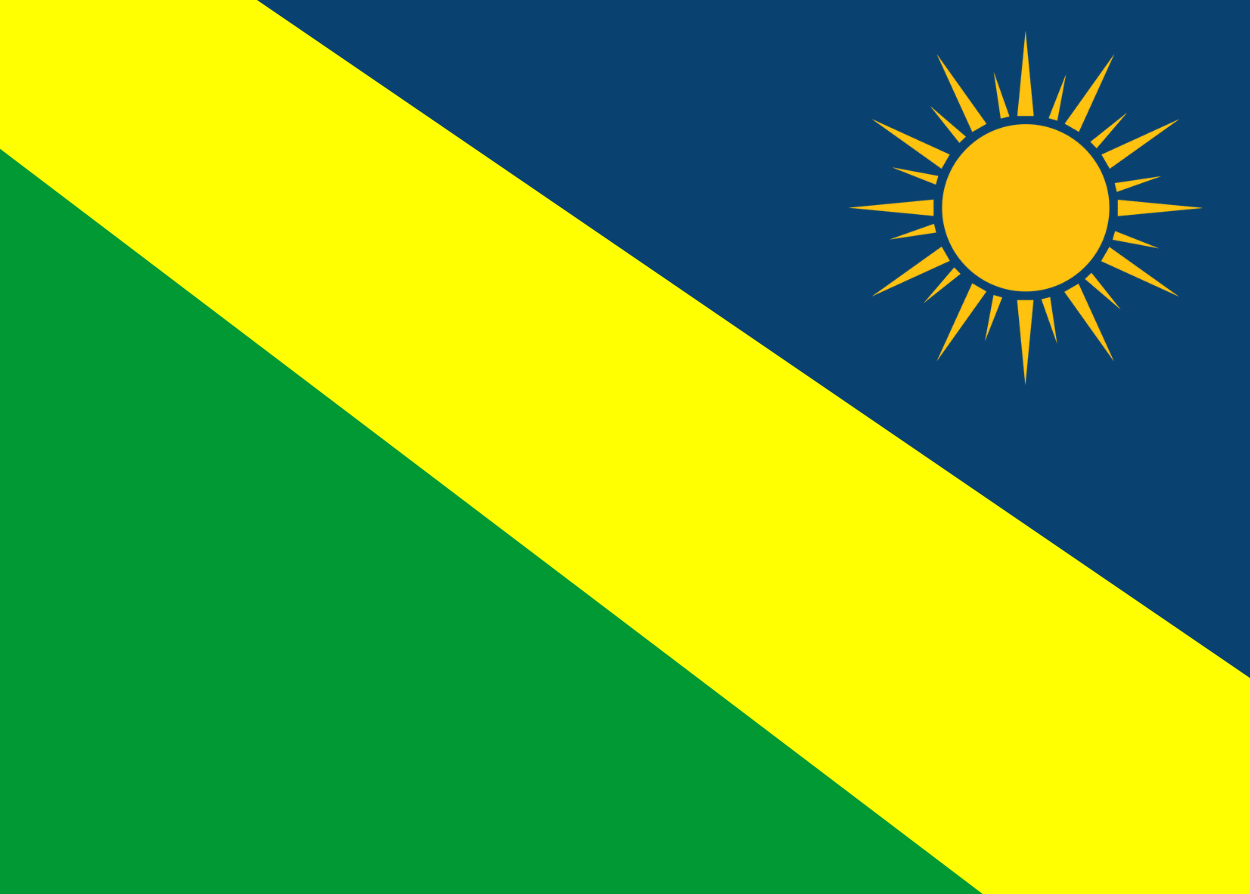
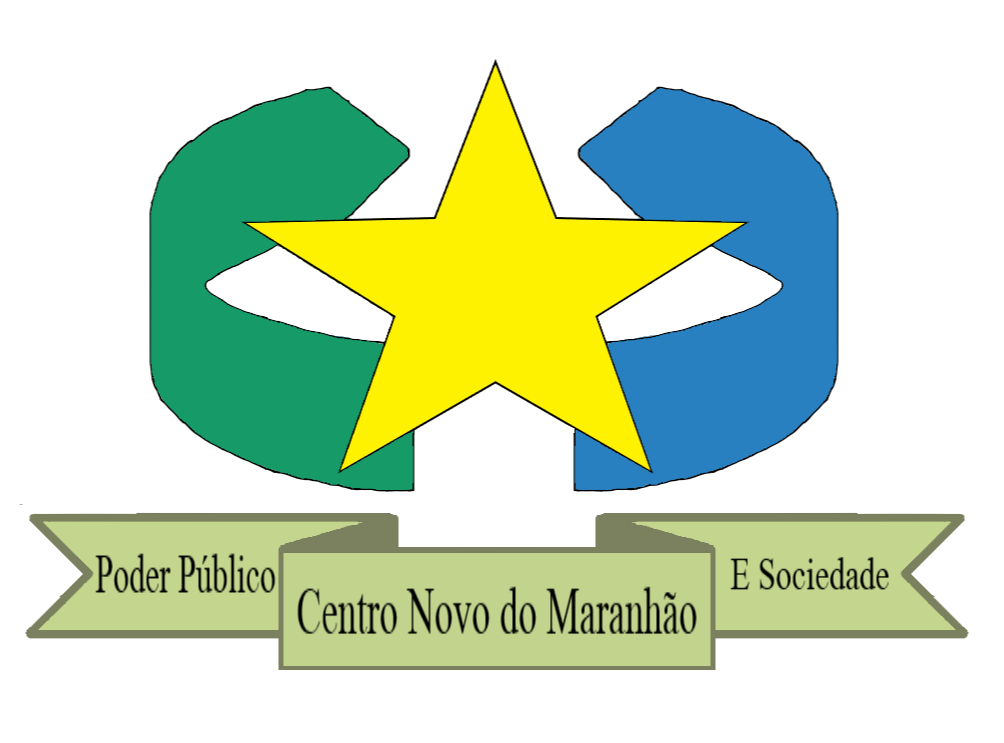
- Flag Coat of arms

- Location in Brazil
- Coordinates: 2.10694°S 46.1278°W
- Country: Brazil
- Region: Nordeste
- State: Maranhão
- Mesoregion: Oeste Maranhense

Area
  - Total: 3,203 sq mi (8,295 km^{2})

Population (2020)
  - Total: 21,840
- Time zone: UTC−3 (BRT)

Centro Novo do Maranhão is a municipality in the state of Maranhão in the Northeast region of Brazil.

The municipality contains part of the 271,197 hectares (670,140 acres) Gurupi Biological Reserve, a full protected conservation unit created in 1988. Average annual rainfall is 2,169 millimetres (85.4 in). Temperatures range from 22 to 32 °C (72 to 90 °F) with an average of 27 °C (81 °F).

== See also ==
- List of municipalities in Maranhão
