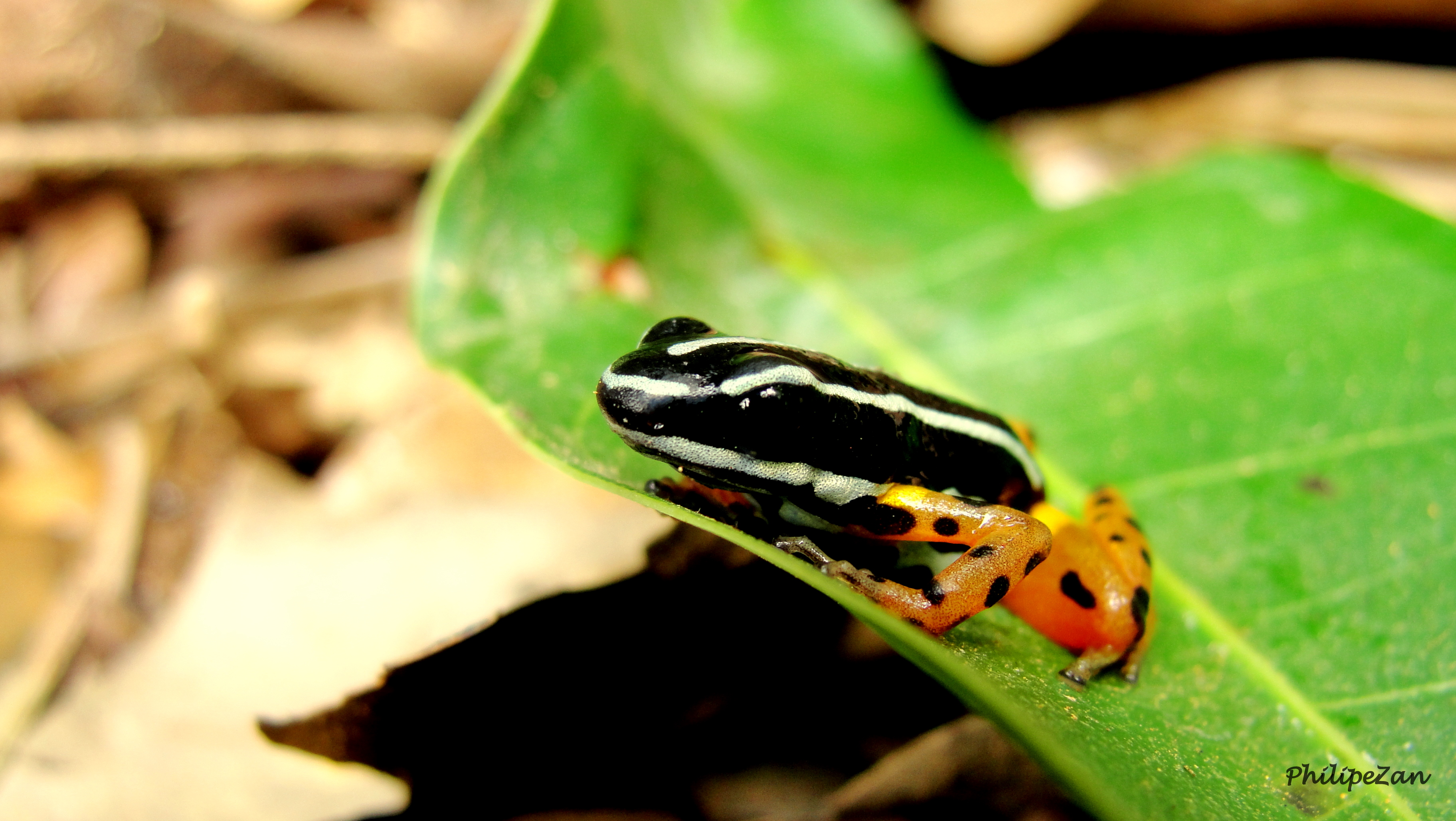

Conservation status
- Least Concern (IUCN 3.1)
- CITES Appendix II (CITES)

Scientific classification
- Kingdom: Animalia
- Phylum: Chordata
- Class: Amphibia
- Order: Anura
- Family: Dendrobatidae
- Genus: Adelphobates
- Species: A. quinquevittatus

Binomial name
- Adelphobates quinquevittatus (Steindachner, 1864)

Synonyms
- Dendrobates quinquevittatus Steindachner, 1864

= Adelphobates quinquevittatus =

Species of frog

Adelphobates quinquevittatus (Rio Madeira poison frog or more ambiguously, Amazonian poison frog) is a species of frog in the family Dendrobatidae found in the Rio Madeira drainage in the southern Amazon Basin in Brazil and Bolivia. Most records of this species before 1990 refer to Ranitomeya ventrimaculata.

== Habitat ==
Scientists have observed this frog on the leaf litter in tropical rainforests. Its known range includes protected parks, including Parque Estadual de Guajará-Mirím.

== Reproduction ==
The female frog lays eggs on the leaf litter. After the eggs hatch, the adult frogs carry the tadpoles to water, such as that in bromeliad plants and in the husks of Brazil nuts.

== Threats ==
The IUCN classifies this frog as least concern of extinction. What threat it faces comes from deforestation in favor of agriculture, mining, fires, and hydroelectric dams.
