= Cristalino State Park =

State park in Mato Grosso, Brazil

- Parque Estadual do Cristalino
- IUCN category II (national park)
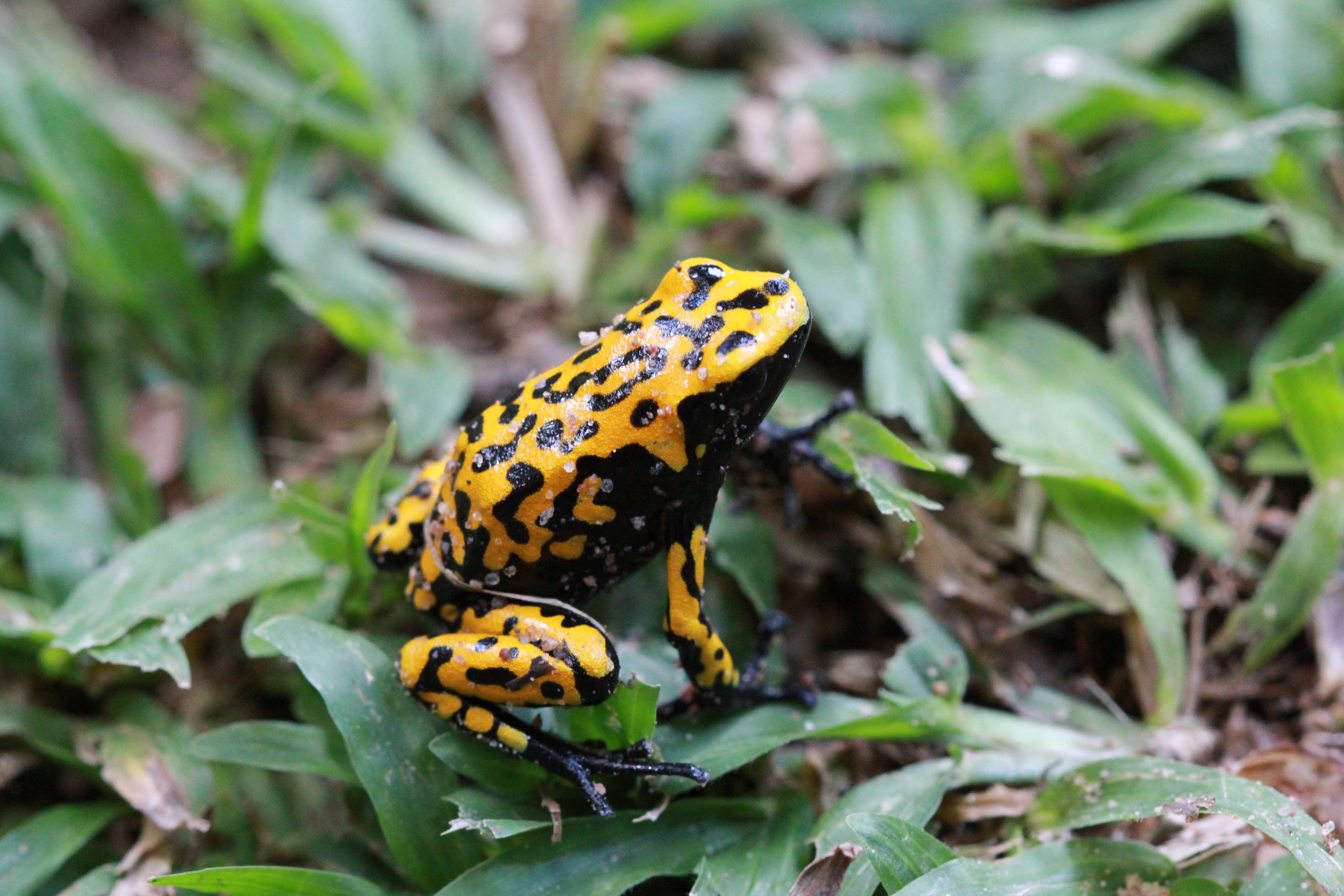
- The unusual variant of the splashback poison frog in the park

- Location within Brazil
- Nearest city: Novo Mundo, Mato Grosso
- Coordinates: 9.525°S 55.651°W
- Area: 184,900 hectares (457,000 acres)
- Designation: State park
- Created: 9 June 2000
- Administrator: SEMA (Secretaria Estadual do Meio Ambiente)

The Cristalino State Park (Portuguese: Parque Estadual do Cristalino) is a state park in the state of Mato Grosso, Brazil.

== Location ==
The Cristalino State Park is in the municipalities of Alta Floresta and Novo Mundo in the extreme north of Mato Grosso, between the Teles Pires river and the border with the state of Pará. The park covers an area of about 184,900 hectares (457,000 acres). Most of the park is in Novo Mundo but part of the extreme west of the park is in Alta Floresta. Its shape is roughly rectangular, extending 89 kilometres (55 mi) east-west and 32 kilometres (20 mi) north-south. The park is on the border of the "arc of deforestation" in the Amazon rainforest. In the north it borders the Brazilian Airforce base in Pará, which contains a large area of native vegetation. The state park is surrounded by farms to the west, east and south.

The Cristalino River enters the park from Pará to the north, then flows westward through the park below the Pará border before turning south and flowing to the Teles Pires in the southwest. The Serra do Mateiro is in the west of the park. The Rochedo River rises in the east of the park, flowing through the Serra do Rochedo on the park's south boundary. The Nhandú River defines the eastern boundary of the park. The park is accessible by water via the Teles Pires River to the mouth of the Cristalino River, then up that river through the park.

The park can also be reached by the unpaved Quarta Leste road from the municipal center of Alta Floresta, taking a ferry across the Teles Pires River. The road runs through the park as far as the Cristalino River. Another dirt road from the Primeira Leste highway runs parallel to the boundary with Pará to the Cristalino River. Unofficial roads opened by ranchers and loggers enter the eastern end of the park, but do not reach the Cristalino River basin. SEMA has a station for researchers and students, including a house with four bedrooms, one bathroom and a power generator.

== Environment ==
The climate is hot and humid, with annual average temperatures over 24 °C (75 °F) and average annual rainfall above 2,400 millimetres (94 in). There is a dry season from May to September with monthly total rainfall is less than 100 millimetres (3.9 in). The park is in the ecotone or transition zone between Amazon rainforest and cerrado. The reserve would be in the proposed South Amazon Ecotones Ecological Corridor. Vegetation includes rainforest, seasonal forest, campinarana, rocky fields and pioneer fluvial or lacustrine formations. 515 species of birds have been recorded, with 55 endemic species, 43 of reptiles, 29 of amphibians, 36 of mammals and 16 fish species with commercial or sports value.

Ecotourism, including observation of wildlife and hiking, generates some income and may help encourage sustainable environmental development in the surrounding area. However, the park has been threatened since the time of its creation with land clearance for cattle pasture, illegal logging and construction of infrastructure such as small hydroelectric plants. Little has been done to prevent damage to the environment, and there is lack of local community support for the park. Threats include illegal logging, which has steadily advanced north into the park, family agriculture producing annual crops such as rice and beans, and cattle farming.

== Legal history ==
The Cristalino State Park was created on 9 June 2000. It had an initial area of 66,900 hectares (165,000 acres). Objectives were to preserve animals and native species of trees threatened with extinction. The Cristalino II State Park was created by decree 2.628 of 30 May 2001. These two contiguous parks together have an area of 184,900 hectares (457,000 acres). The park is administered by the State Department of the Environment (SEMA). SEMA has been working with the Cristalino Ecological Foundation, ICV, Forest Institute and UNEMAT to prepare the management plan. The consultative council was installed in 2007 with representatives of civil society and public organizations. As of 2016 the park was supported by the Amazon Region Protected Areas Program.

== Sources ==
- Ayres, José Márcio; Da Fonseca, Gustavo A. B.; Rylands, Anthony B.; Queiroz, Helder L.; Pinto, Luiz Paulo; Masterson, Donald; Cavalcanti, Roberto B. (2005), Os Corredores Ecológicos das Florestas Tropicais do Brasil (PDF) (in Portuguese), Sociedade Civil Mamirauá, archived from the original (PDF) on 2016-07-31
- Full list: PAs supported by ARPA, ARPA
- Infraestrutura do Módulo do Parque Estadual do Cristalino (in Portuguese), PPBio
- Parque Estadual Cristalino: Um lugar para se conservar (PDF) (in Portuguese), Cuiabá - MT: Governo de Estado de Mato Grosso: Fundação Estadual do Meio Ambiente - FEMA-MT, 2002, archived from the original (PDF) on 2016-11-03
- PES Cristalino II (in Portuguese), ISA: Instituto Socioambiental
- Pereira, Cristiane Leite; Nascimento, Elimar Pinheiro do (July–December 2010), "Luta em torno do Parque Estadual Cristalino (MT): qual a natureza do conflito?" (PDF), Revista de Ciências Sociais, 41 (2), Fortaleza, archived from the original (PDF) on 2016-11-03
- Plano de Manejo do Parque Estadual do Cristalino (PDF) (in Portuguese), vol. I: Diagnåstico Ambiental e Socioeconômico, Cuiaba, 2009, archived from the original (PDF) on 2016-12-20
