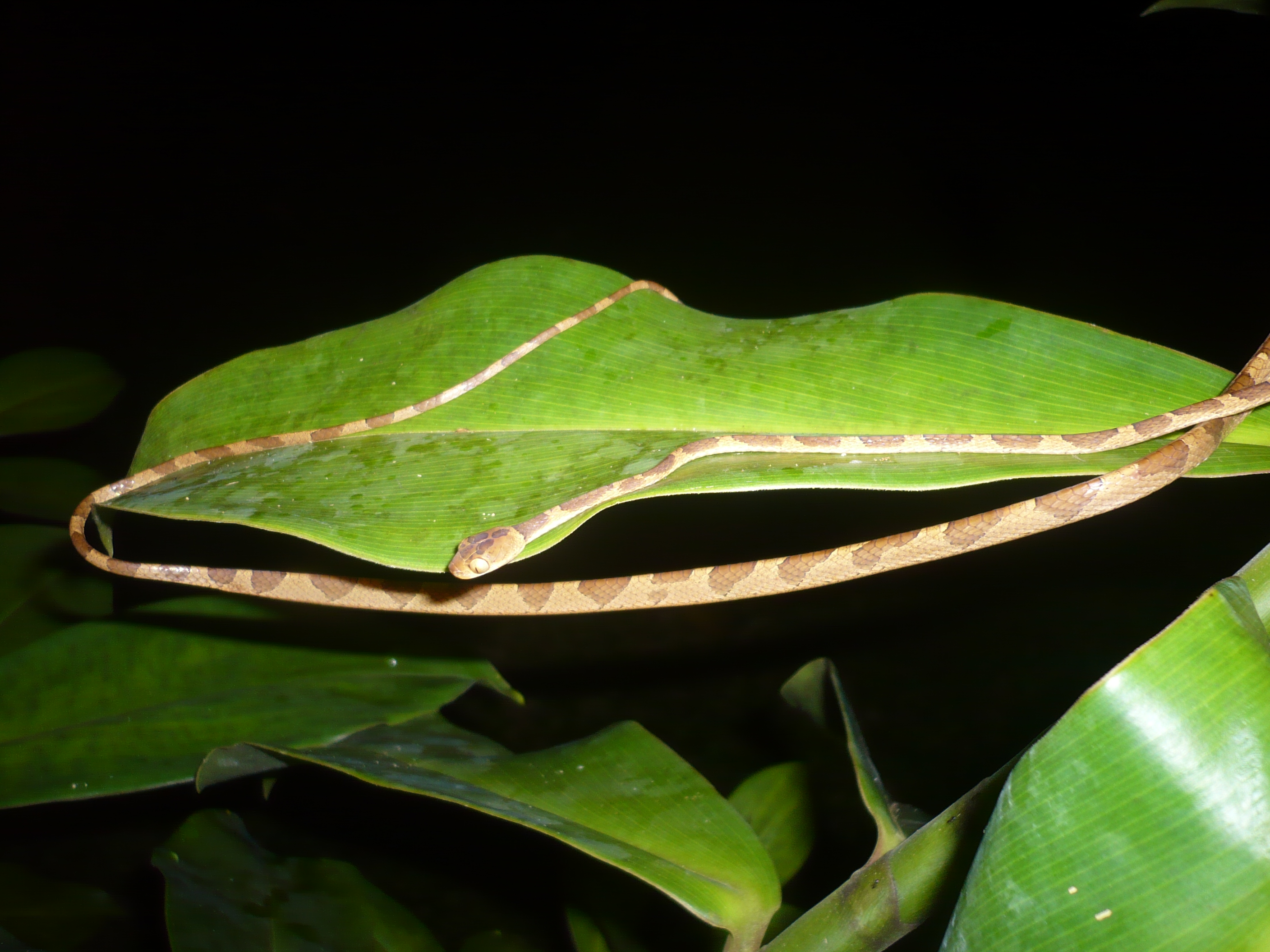

Conservation status
- Least Concern (IUCN 3.1)

Scientific classification
- Kingdom: Animalia
- Phylum: Chordata
- Class: Reptilia
- Order: Squamata
- Suborder: Serpentes
- Family: Colubridae
- Genus: Imantodes
- Species: I. lentiferus

Binomial name
- Imantodes lentiferus (Cope, 1894)

= Imantodes lentiferus =

Species of snake

Imantodes lentiferus, commonly known as the Amazon Basin tree snake, is a species of snake of the family Colubridae.

== Geographic range ==
The snake is found in South America.
