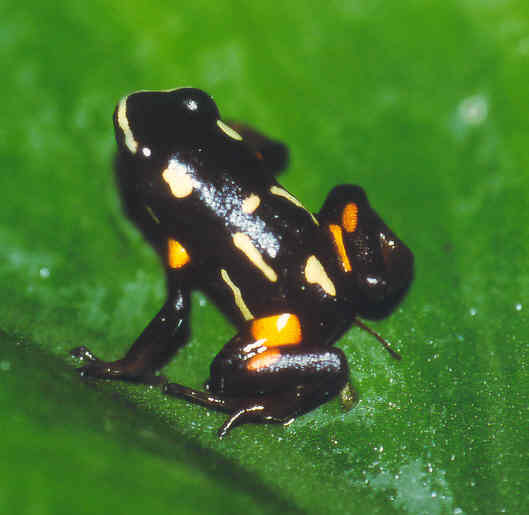
- Adelphobates castaneoticus

Scientific classification
- Kingdom: Animalia
- Phylum: Chordata
- Class: Amphibia
- Order: Anura
- Family: Dendrobatidae
- Subfamily: Dendrobatinae
- Genus: Adelphobates; Grant et al., 2006

Type species
- Adelphobates castaneoticus (Caldwell and Myers, 1990)

Species
- 3 species (see text)

= Adelphobates =

Genus of amphibians

Adelphobates is a small genus of poison dart frogs. They are found in the central and lower Amazon basin of Peru and Brazil, possibly Bolivia. It was originally erected as a sister group to the Dendrobates and Oophaga genera. The validity of the genus is still being discussed, with the alternative being "Dendrobates galactonotus group" within Dendrobates. One species originally placed in this genus as Adelphobates captivus has since been moved to the genus Excidobates erected in 2008.

== Etymology ==
The generic name Adelphobates comes from Ancient Greek ἀδελφός (adelphós), meaning "brother", and -βάτης (bátes), meaning "climber". Ths "Adelpho-" part refers to Charles W. Myers and John W. Daly, two unrelated scientists directly involved with studies of the species.

== Biology ==
All members have conspicuous, vibrant coloration, and smooth skin. A peculiar feature of their reproduction is that tadpoles are transported to Brazil nut capsules lying on the forest floor. Cannibalism may result if more than one tadpole ends up in the same capsule.

== Poison ==
All poison frogs are toxic and noxious. Like frogs of the genus Dendrobates, Adelphobates contain Pumiliotoxin 251D, which is hydroxylated to Allopumiliotoxin 267A, which is 5 times more toxic. The median lethal dose is 200 μg/kg and 40 μg/kg respectively.

== Species ==
There are three species:

Genus Adelphobates – Hodgson, 1838 – two species
Common name	Scientific name and subspecies	Range	Size and ecology	IUCN status and estimated population
Brazil-nut poison frog	Adelphobates castaneoticus (Caldwell and Myers, 1990)	State of Pará in Brazil	Size: Habitat: Diet:	LC
Splash-backed poison frog or splashback poison frog	Adelphobates galactonotus (Steindachner, 1864)	Southern Amazon Basin in Brazil.	Size: Habitat: Diet:	LC
Amazonian poison frog	Adelphobates quinquevittatus (Steindachner, 1864)	Southern Amazon Basin in Brazil and Bolivia.	Size: Habitat: Diet:	LC
