= Cristalino II State Park =

State park in Mato Grosso, Brazil

- Parque Estadual Cristalino II
- IUCN category II (national park)
- Location within Brazil
- Nearest city: Novo Mundo, Mato Grosso
- Coordinates: 9.596794°S 55.491129°W
- Area: 118,000 hectares (290,000 acres)
- Designation: State park
- Created: 30 May 2001
- Administrator: Coordenadoria de Unidades de Conservação

The Cristalino II State Park (Portuguese: Parque Estadual Cristalino II) is a state park in the state of Mato Grosso, Brazil. It protects an area of savanna and rainforest that is rich in biodiversity. Parts of the park have been invaded by loggers, squatters and cattle ranchers, often supported by local and state politicians.

== Location ==
The Cristalino II State Park is in the municipality of Novo Mundo, Mato Grosso. It has an area of 118,000 hectares (290,000 acres). The park is in the north of Mato Grosso and adjoins the border with the state of Pará in its eastern section and the Cristalino State Park in the western section. The southwest corner of the park is bounded by the Teles Pires or São Manuel River. The Serra Rochedo is the source of many pure and crystalline springs of water, for which the park is named.

Vegetation includes savanna, seasonal forest, rainforest and transitional forest. The region is rich in biodiversity, with 850 species of birds recorded of which 50 are endemic, 43 species of reptiles, 29 of amphibians, 36 of mammals and 16 of fish. The climate is typical continental tropical, best between May and October for ecotourism. The park is an excellent place for birdwatching. The main threats come from illegal logging and settlements around the park.

== History ==
The Cristalino State Park in the municipality of Alta Floresta was created by decree 1.471 of June 9, 2000 with an area of 66,900 hectares. The Cristalino II State Park was created by decree 2.628 of 30 May 2001 to fully protect the biological, physical and landscape resources of the primary forests, rapids, waterfalls and archaeological sites. These two contiguous parks together have an area of 184,900 hectares (457,000 acres).

Since creation the parks have been threatened by invasions of farmers supported by state and local politicians. At the start of 2002 the governor Dante de Oliveira sent two messages to the Mato Grosso Legislative Assembly proposing to reduce the parks by 72,400 hectares (179,000 acres), or 42% of their total area. The justification was to eliminate land that had already been converted to pasture. In December 2002 a federal judge found that the state government had carried out improper sales of land, made the federal Instituto Nacional de Colonização e Reforma Agrária (INCRA) the owner of the lands and gave the federal Brazilian Institute of Environment and Renewable Natural Resources (IBAMA) administrative responsibility.

Attempts were made to destroy all bridges on the Nhandú River, which carried most of the illegally extracted wood, to impose fines and prosecution for logging, and to evict squatters. This action was dropped at the end of 2003 and the squatters remained, while deforestation continued. INCRA made plans to settle about 5,000 families of landless rural workers in the Novo Mundo municipality, adding about 20,000 people to the existing population of 3,590. Negotiations over the park were taken to Brasilia, where the Ministry of the Environment authorized continued logging while the case was being studied.

In June 2005 the State Environmental Foundation (FEMA) was disbanded and replaced by SEMA, and a federal supreme court preliminary injunction returned control to the state. SEMA was to reactivate the surveillance post and would be supported by police and environmental agents in preventing further invasions. Disputes continued. The state deputies approved law 8.616 in 2006 to reduce the park area, the governor vetoed this law in response to public pressure, and the deputies overthrew his veto. A judicial order of 26 January 2007 suspended law 8.616.

Ordinance 142 of 5 November 2007 created the consultative council for the Cristalino and Cristalino II state parks. A management plan was issued in 2009. At this time the farms, settlements and logging operations in the park remained, and the discussion on how to resolve the situation were continuing. Ordinance 31 of 19 March 2010 approved the management plan of the two parks, which was revised in 2014. On 17 October 2014 SEMA called on landowners and squatters to submit claims pending regularization of land ownership in the park.

== Sources ==
- PES Cristalino II (in Portuguese), ISA: Instituto Socioambiental
- Plano de Manejo do Parque Estadual do Cristalino (PDF) (in Portuguese), vol. I: Diagnåstico Ambiental e Socioeconômico, Cuiaba, 2009, archived from the original (PDF) on 2016-12-20
