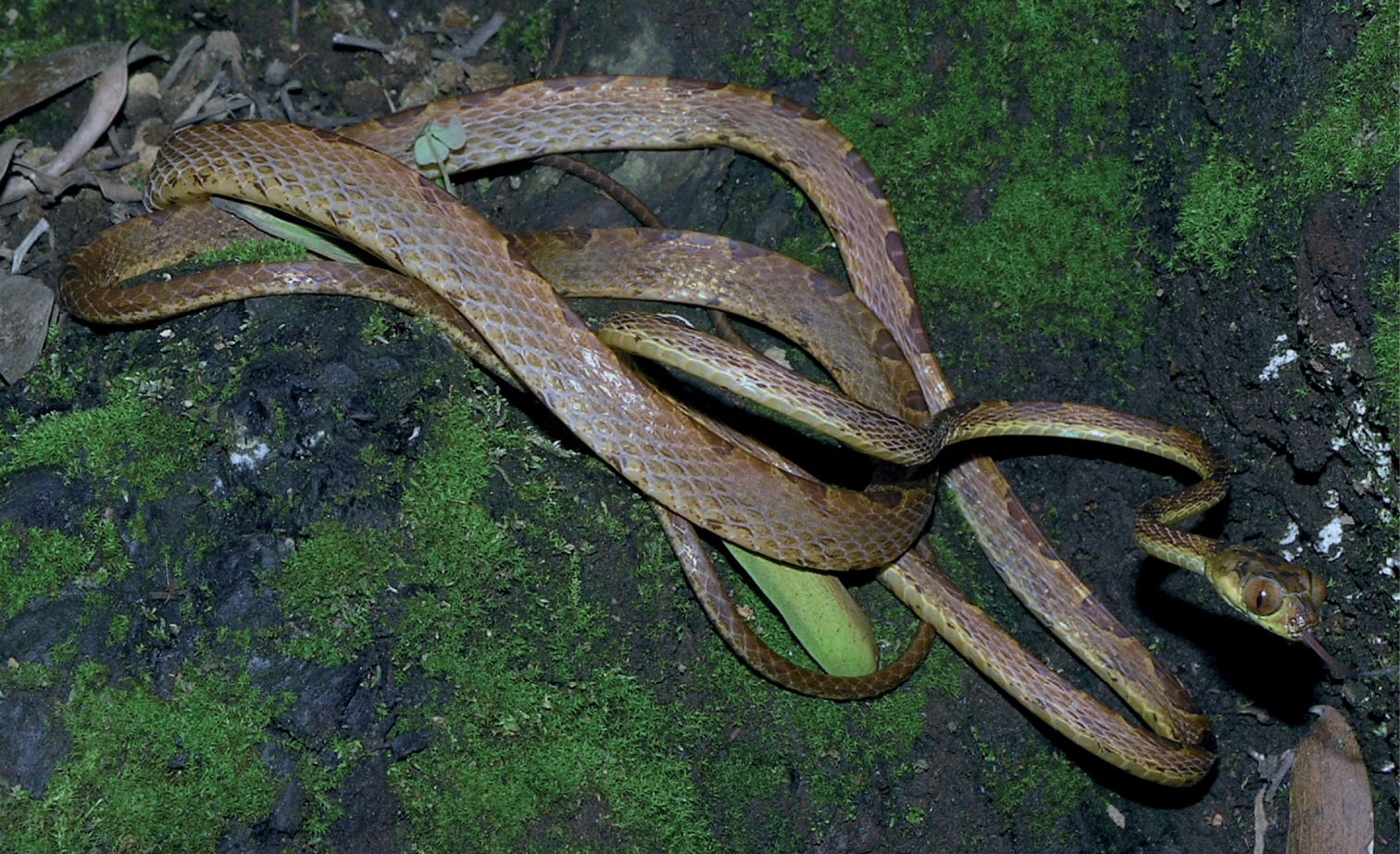

Conservation status
- Least Concern (IUCN 3.1)

Scientific classification
- Kingdom: Animalia
- Phylum: Chordata
- Class: Reptilia
- Order: Squamata
- Suborder: Serpentes
- Family: Colubridae
- Genus: Imantodes
- Species: I. chocoensis

Binomial name
- Imantodes chocoensis Torres-Carvajal, Yánez-Muñoz, Quirola, Smith, & Almendáriz, 2012

= Imantodes chocoensis =

Species of snake

Imantodes chocoensis, the Chocoan blunt-headed vine snake s a species of snake in the family Colubridae. The species is native to Ecuador and Colombia.
