= Novo Mundo =

Coordinates: 9°57′00″S 55°11′52″W

- Municipality
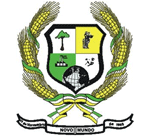
- Flag Coat of arms

- Country: Brazil
- Region: Center-West
- State: Mato Grosso
- Mesoregion: Norte Mato-Grossense

Population (2020)
  - Total: 9,363
- Time zone: UTC−3 (BRT)

Novo Mundo is a municipality in the state of Mato Grosso in the Central-West Region of Brazil.

The municipality contains most of the 184,900-hectare (457,000-acre) Cristalino State Park, created in 2001. The municipality contains the 118,000-hectare (290,000-acre) Cristalino II State Park, created in 2001.

== See also ==
- List of municipalities in Mato Grosso
