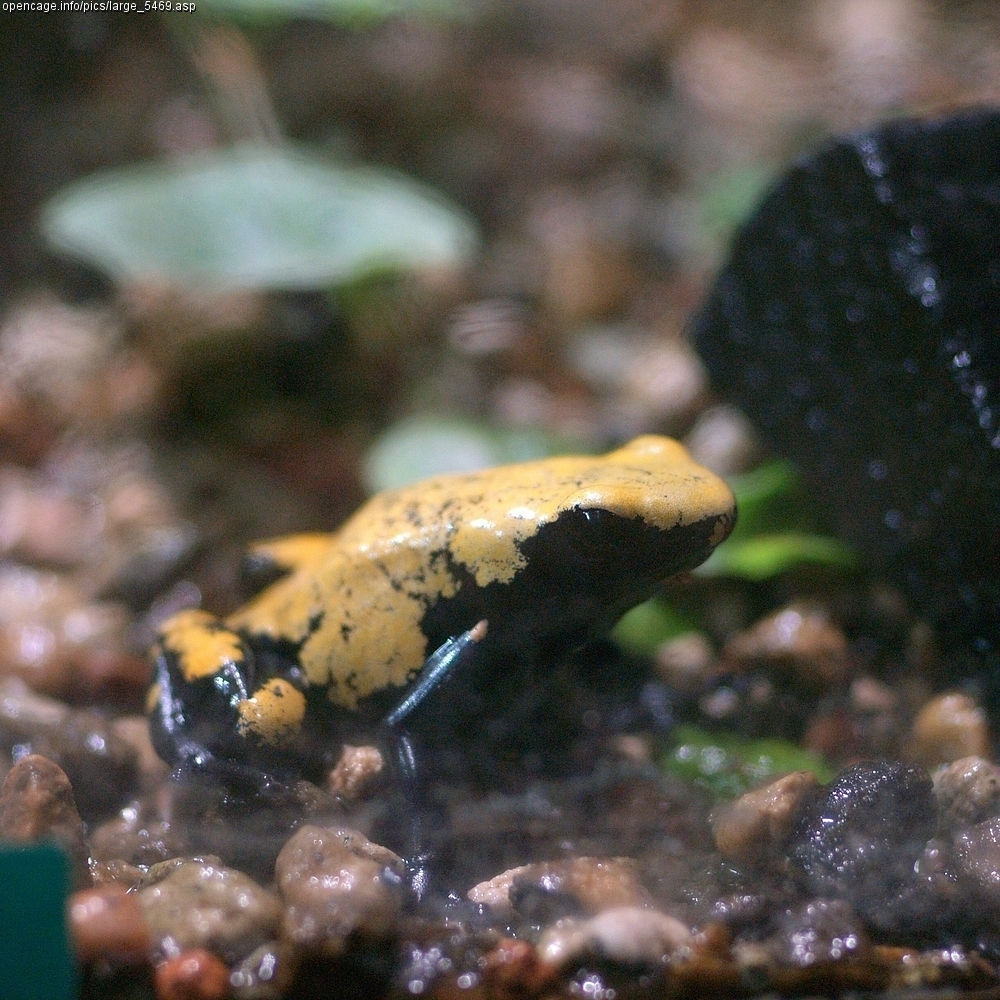

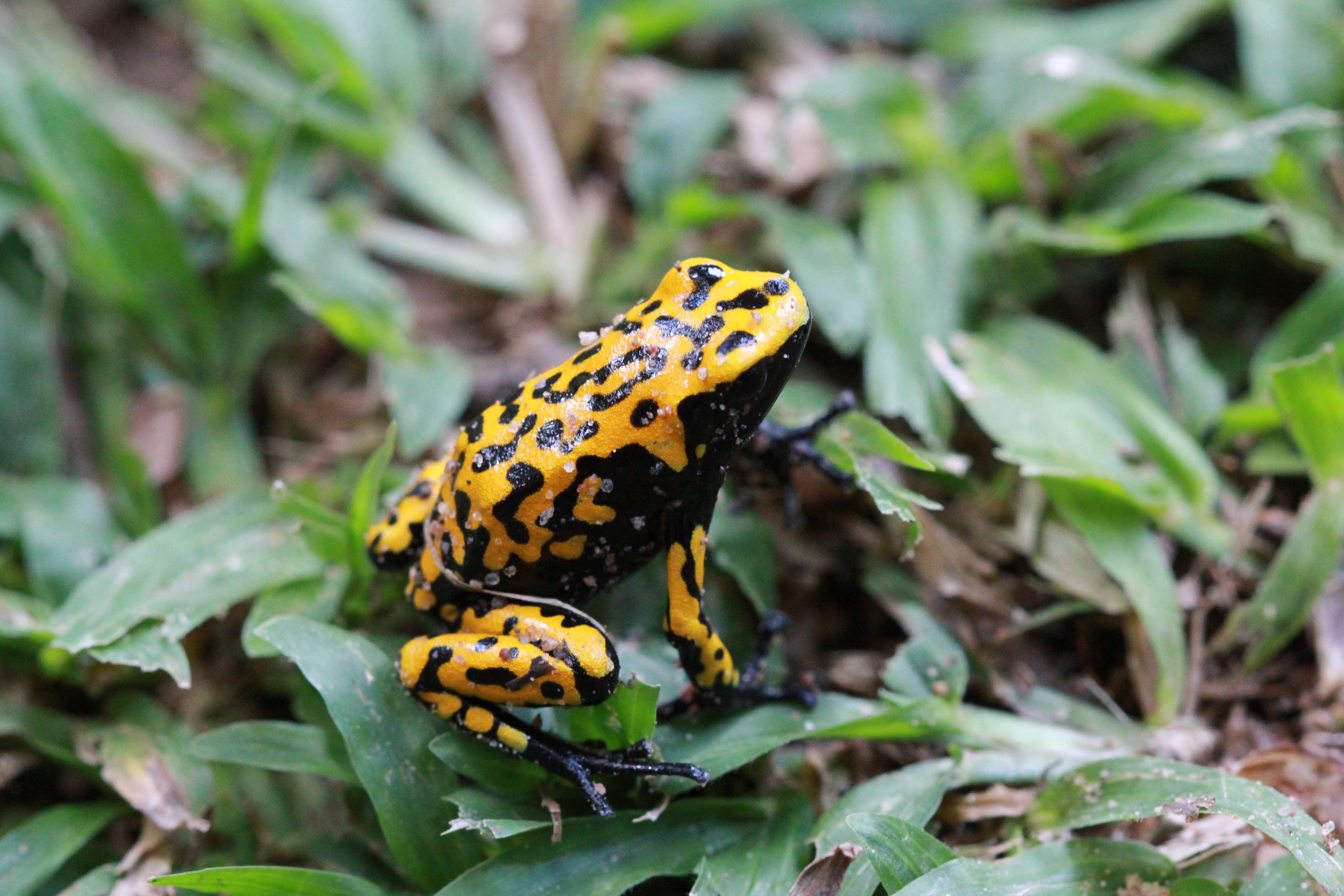
- Yellow-backed variant (above, captive) and yellow-and-black netted variant (below, from Cristalino State Park)

Conservation status
- Least Concern (IUCN 3.1)
- CITES Appendix II

Scientific classification
- Kingdom: Animalia
- Phylum: Chordata
- Class: Amphibia
- Order: Anura
- Family: Dendrobatidae
- Genus: Adelphobates
- Species: A. galactonotus

Binomial name
- Adelphobates galactonotus (Steindachner, 1864)
- Distribution of the splash-backed poison frog

Synonyms
- Dendrobates galactonotus Steindachner, 1864; Dendrobates paraensis Boulenger, 1913

= Adelphobates galactonotus =

Splashback poison frog

Species of amphibian

Adelphobates galactonotus (splash-backed poison frog or splashback poison frog) is a species of poison dart frog. It is endemic to the rainforest of the southern Amazon Basin in Brazil.

== Habitat ==
The frog's natural habitats are tropical moist lowland forests, where it has been observed as high as 600 meters above sea level. It seems to prefer forest habitats with large numbers of Brazil nut trees. The eggs are laid on the ground. After the eggs hatch, the adult frogs carry the tadpoles to water. Scientists believe this may include water collected in Brazil nut husks.

The frog's known range includes many protected areas.

== Threats ==
The IUCN classifies this frog as least concern of extinction and notes that it has shown some tolerance to habitat disturbance. Though it remains widespread and locally common, it is threatened by habitat loss and has already disappeared from some localities due to deforestation and flooding caused by hydroelectric dams. The species is relatively common in captivity and regularly bred, but the wild populations are still at risk from illegal collection.

== Description ==
This relatively large poison dart frog has a snout-vent length of up to 42 mm (1.7 in).

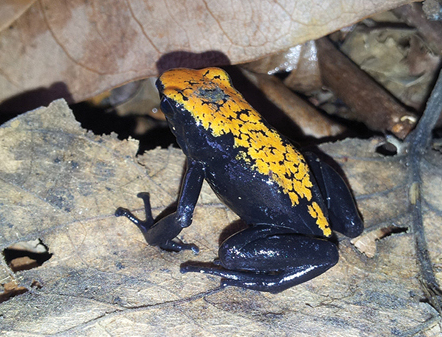
Gurupi Biological Reserve, Maranhão, Brazil

The best known variants of this species are black below and yellow, orange or red above, but its color is extremely variable with some having whitish-mint or light blue upperparts, some having a mottled or spotted pattern above, and some being almost all whitish (popularly known as "moonshine" among captive frog keepers), yellow-orange or black. It has been speculated that some morphs were separate species, but genetic testing have revealed virtually no difference between them (including a distinctive variant from Cristalino State Park with a yellow-and-black netted pattern) and the distributions of the morphs do not follow a clear geographic pattern as expected if they were separate species.

Scientists have cited this frog as an example while examining the causes of bright colors in poisonous frogs. One longstanding interpretation is that the bright colors are aposematic, warning predators that the frog will poison them if they attempt to eat it. However, studies of this species noted that the two color morphs, though visually very different, have largely the same poison profile. These scientists believe that the coloration may have more to do with conspecific recognition and sexual selection than with deterring predators.
