= Ctenophryne aterrima =

Conservation status
- Least Concern (IUCN 3.1)

Scientific classification
- Kingdom: Animalia
- Phylum: Chordata
- Class: Amphibia
- Order: Anura
- Family: Microhylidae
- Genus: Ctenophryne
- Species: C. aterrima

Binomial name
- Ctenophryne aterrima (Günther, 1901)

Synonyms
- Glossostoma aterrimum Günther, 1901; Gastrophryne aterrima (Günther, 1901); Microhyla aterrima (Günther, 1901); Nelsonophryne aterrima (Günther, 1901)

Species of frog

Ctenophryne aterrima (common name: Costa Rica Nelson frog, reflecting its earlier placement in Nelsonophryne) is a species of frog in the family Microhylidae. It is found in northwestern Ecuador, the Andes of Colombia, and lowland and premontane zones of Panama and Costa Rica to about 1,600 m (5,200 ft) above sea level.

== Description ==
Ctenophryne aterrima are very robust-bodied frogs with short limbs and a small, pointed head. They are moderately sized, with males growing to 61 mm (2.4 in) and females to 67 mm (2.6 in) in snout–vent length. The skin of the dorsum is smooth and uniformly black to very dark grey in color; the ventral surface is dark brown. The eye is black.

== Habitat and conservation ==
Ctenophryne aterrima is a secretive and nocturnal leaf-litter species that is rarely seen. Its natural habitats are humid lowland and montane forests. Adults can be found under fallen logs and other debris. They breed in swamps and shallow pools on the forest floor.

The species is not threatened, but habitat loss caused by agricultural development, plantations, illegal crops, logging, and human settlement, and pollution resulting from the spraying of illegal crops remain possible threats.
