= Ctenophryne aequatorialis =

Conservation status
- Endangered (IUCN 3.1)

Scientific classification
- Kingdom: Animalia
- Phylum: Chordata
- Class: Amphibia
- Order: Anura
- Family: Microhylidae
- Genus: Ctenophryne
- Species: C. aequatorialis

Binomial name
- Ctenophryne aequatorialis (Peracca, 1904)

Synonyms
- Engistoma aequatoriale Peracca, 1904; Gastrophryne aequatorialis (Peracca, 1904); Microhyla aequatorialis (Peracca, 1904); Glossostoma aequatoriale (Peracca, 1904); Nelsonophryne aequatorialis (Peracca, 1904)

Species of frog

Ctenophryne aequatorialis (common name: Cuenca Nelson frog, reflecting its earlier placement in Nelsonophryne) is a species of frog in the family Microhylidae. It is endemic to the Andes of Ecuador and known from the Cuenca basin in Azuay Province southward to Saraguro Canton (northern Loja Province) at elevations of 2,450–2,650 m (8,040–8,690 ft) asl.

== Description ==
Males measure about 27 mm (1.1 in) and females 37 mm (1.5 in) in snout–vent length. The dorsum has characteristic pattern of dark patches. The toes have basal webbing.

== Habitat and conservation ==
The species inhabits pastures, grassland, agricultural fields, and degraded secondary habitats. They have been collected close to small pools. Eggs are laid in small pools. The tadpoles reach metamorphosis after three months.

In Ecuador it is considered "endangered" because of its relatively small range, few known and presumably fragmented populations, and presumed decline in abundance. It might be present in the El Cajas National Park.
