= Ctenophryne barbatula =

Conservation status
- Endangered (IUCN 3.1)

Scientific classification
- Kingdom: Animalia
- Phylum: Chordata
- Class: Amphibia
- Order: Anura
- Family: Microhylidae
- Genus: Ctenophryne
- Species: C. barbatula

Binomial name
- Ctenophryne barbatula (Lehr and Trueb, 2007)

Synonyms
- Melanophryne barbatula Lehr and Trueb, 2007

Species of frog

Ctenophryne barbatula is a species of frog in the family Microhylidae. It is endemic to Peru and only known from the Yanachaga–Chemillén National Park, its type locality in the Pasco Region. The specific name barbatula is the diminutive of the Latin barbatus, meaning "bearded". It refers to the beard-like spines under the lower jaw of males.

== Description ==
Adult males measure 22–25 mm (0.87–0.98 in) and adult females 26–27 mm (1.0–1.1 in) in snout–vent length. The head is nearly as broad as the body. The snout is truncate. The eyes are relatively large. The supra-tympanic fold is moderate. Males have white spines in most parts of the body while females have spines only in the region of tympanum (tympanic annulus and tympanic membrane are absent). The dorsum and venter of preserved specimens are uniform brown and lack pattern; the color of live individuals is not known. The fingers and toes have rounded tips; the toes have basal webbing.

== Habitat and conservation ==
Ctenophryne barbatula inhabits forested areas at around 2,500 m (8,200 ft) above sea level. Its diet consists of various arthropods; the composition suggests that it is a leaf litter frog.

Despite occurring within a protected area, Ctenophryne barbatula is considered Endangered because of its small known range and habitat loss in the area.
