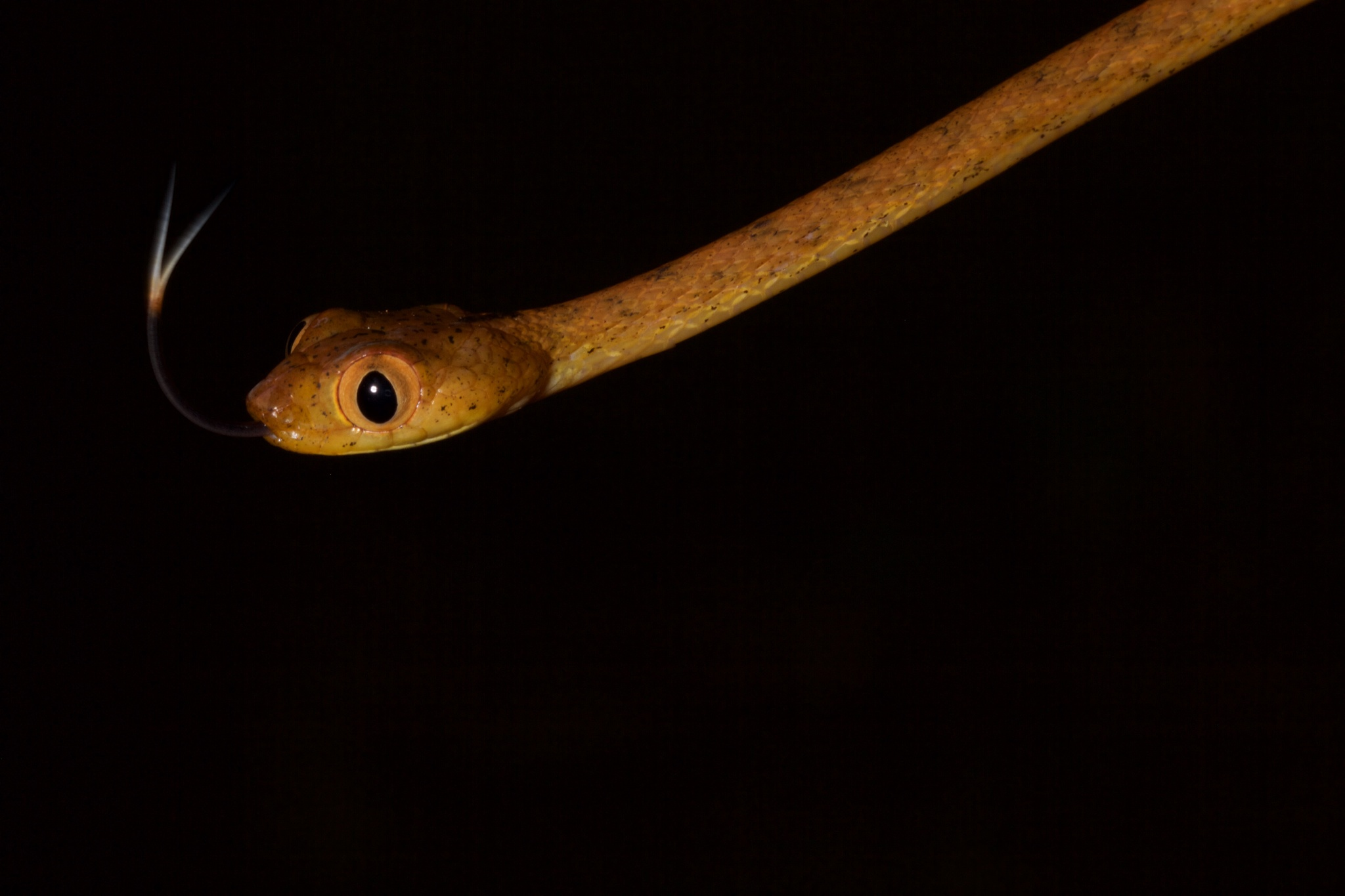

Conservation status
- Least Concern (IUCN 3.1)

Scientific classification
- Domain: Eukaryota
- Kingdom: Animalia
- Phylum: Chordata
- Class: Reptilia
- Order: Squamata
- Suborder: Serpentes
- Family: Colubridae
- Genus: Imantodes
- Species: I. inornatus

Binomial name
- Imantodes inornatus (Boulenger, 1896)

Synonyms
- Himantodes inornatus Boulenger, 1896

= Imantodes inornatus =

Species of snake

Imantodes inornatus, the western tree snake, is a species of colubrid snake native to Central America. It can be found from Guatemala to Ecuador.
