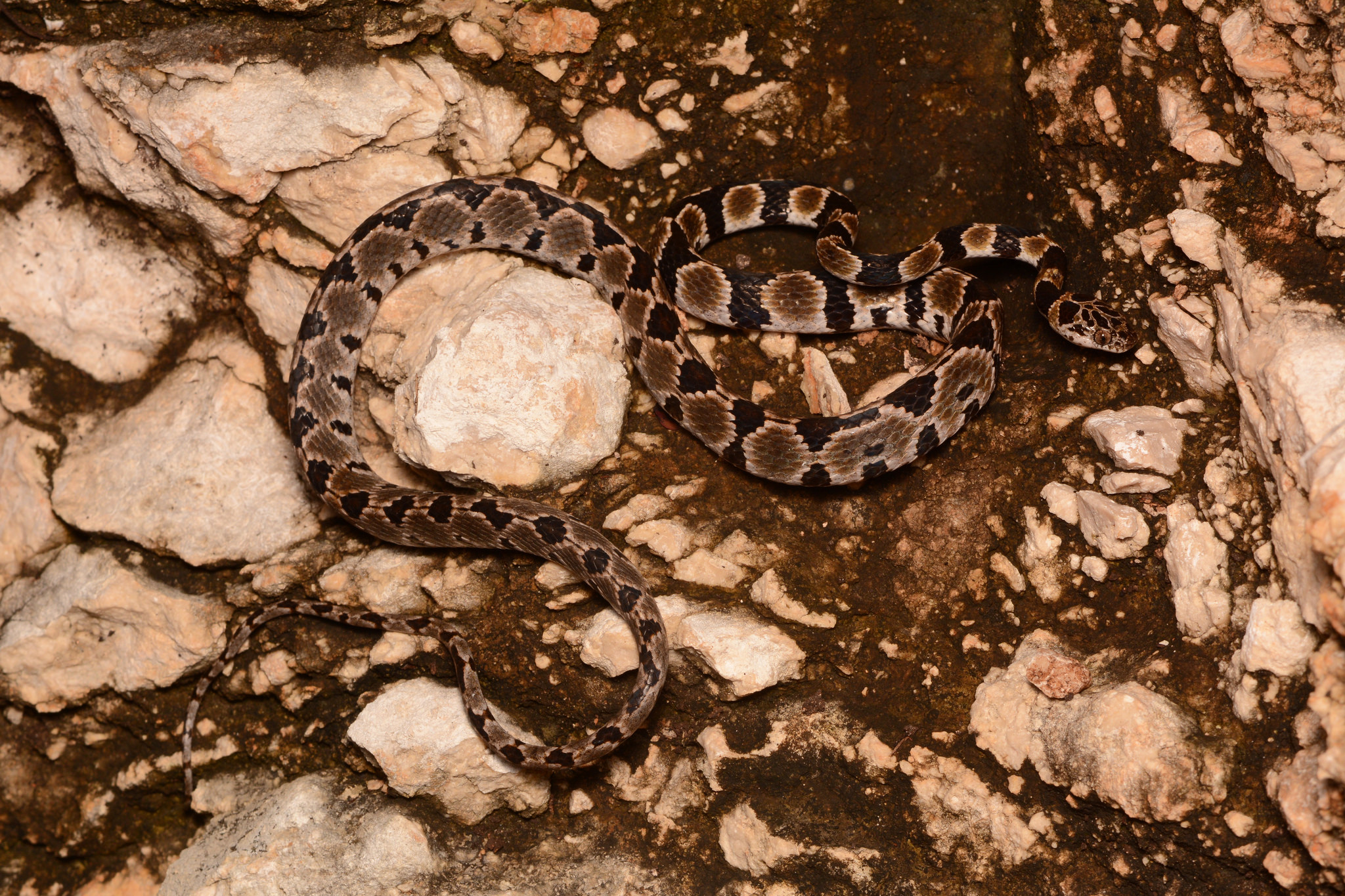

Conservation status
- Least Concern (IUCN 3.1)

Scientific classification
- Kingdom: Animalia
- Phylum: Chordata
- Class: Reptilia
- Order: Squamata
- Suborder: Serpentes
- Family: Colubridae
- Genus: Imantodes
- Species: I. gemmistratus

Binomial name
- Imantodes gemmistratus Cope, 1861

Synonyms
- Himantodes gemmistratus Cope, 1861; Dipsas gemmistrata (Cope, 1861); Dipsas cenchoa var. reticulata Müller, 1882; Dipsas gemmistrata var. latistrata Cope, 1887; Dipsas gracillima Günther, 1895; Dipsas splendida Günther, 1895; Imantodes splendidus (Günther, 1895); Imantodes luciodorsus Oliver, 1942; Imantodes splendidus luciodorsus Oliver, 1942; Imantodes splendidus oliveri Smith, 1942

= Imantodes gemmistratus =

Species of snake

Imantodes gemmistratus, the Central American tree snake, is a snake species in the colubrid family, found from Mexico, through Central America and Colombia.

== Distribution ==
Mexico, Guatemala, Honduras, El Salvador, Nicaragua, Costa Rica, Panama, Colombia, and possibly in Belize.

== Subspecies ==
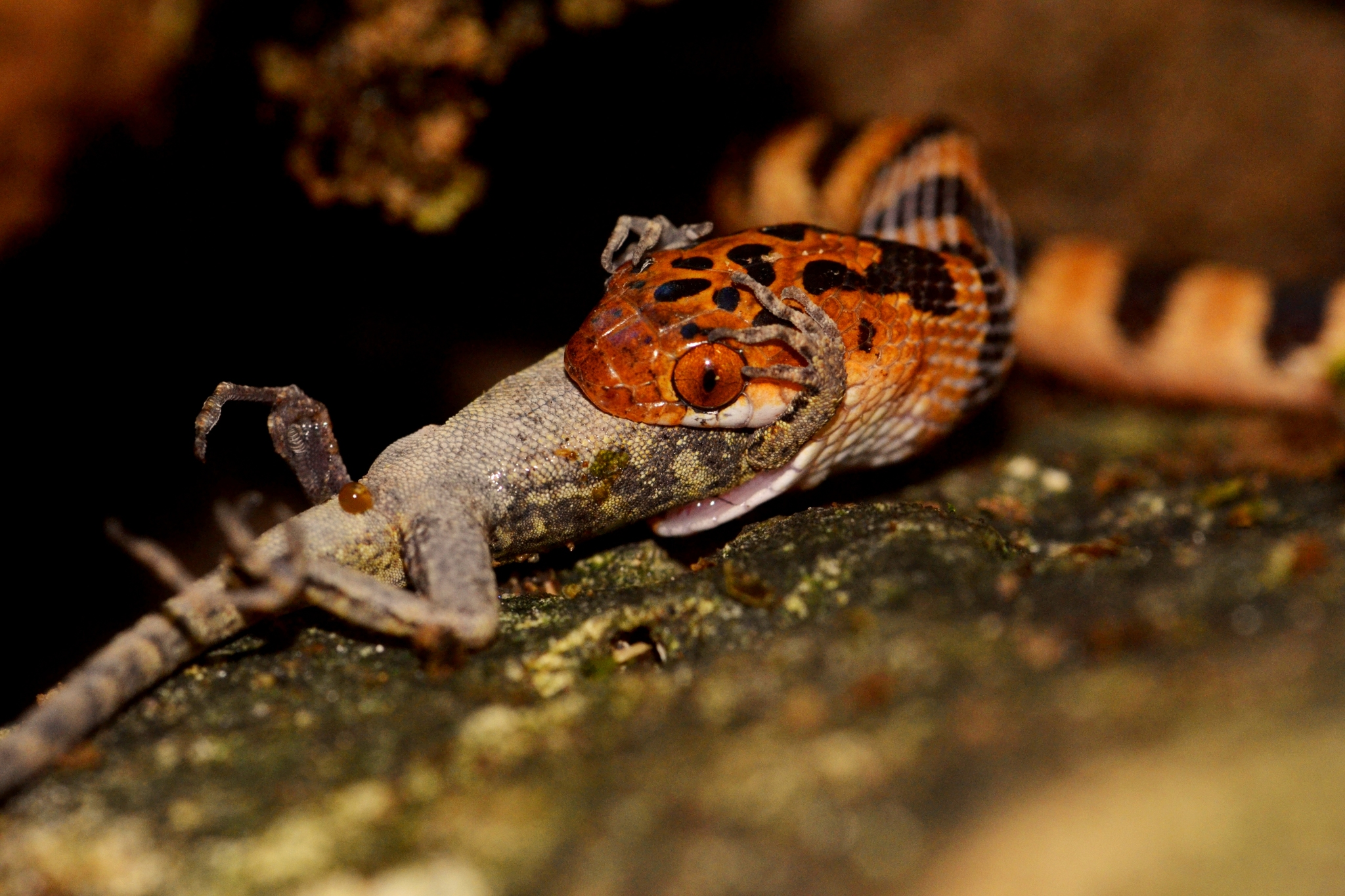
I. g. splendidus eating a brown anole.

The following subspecies are recognized:

- Imantodes gemmistratus gemmistratus (Cope, 1861)
- Imantodes gemmistratus gracillimus (Günther, 1895)
- Imantodes gemmistratus latistratus (Cope, 1887)
- Imantodes gemmistratus luciodorsus Oliver, 1942
- Imantodes gemmistratus oliveri Smith, 1942
- Imantodes gemmistratus reticulatus (Müller, 1882)
- Imantodes gemmistratus splendidus (Günther, 1895)
