= Leptodactylus paraensis =

Conservation status
- Least Concern (IUCN 3.1)

Scientific classification
- Kingdom: Animalia
- Phylum: Chordata
- Class: Amphibia
- Order: Anura
- Family: Leptodactylidae
- Genus: Leptodactylus
- Species: L. paraensis

Binomial name
- Leptodactylus paraensis Heyer, 2005

Species of frog

Leptodactylus paraensis, the Pará thin-toed frog, is a species of frog in the family Leptodactylidae. It is endemic to the states of Mato Grosso and Pará in Brazil.

== Description ==
The adult male frog measures 99-129 mm in snout-vent length and the adult female frog 118-140 mm. The dorsum is dark with marks on it. There are dark triangles on the lips, sometimes touching the eyes.

== Habitat ==
Scientists have observed this frog in primary, closed-canopy rainforest. They have also been observed in forests that have undergone some selective logging.

Scientists have reported these frogs in protected areas, including Tapajos National Forest.

== Reproduction ==
Scientists believe this frog builds a foam nest for its eggs, like its congeners. After the eggs hatch, the tadpoles are washed into bodies of water.

== Threats ==
The IUCN classifies this species as least concern of extinction.
