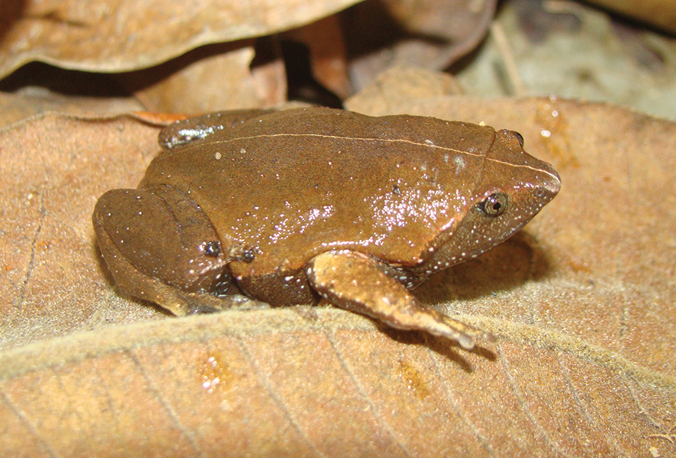
- Maranhão, Brazil
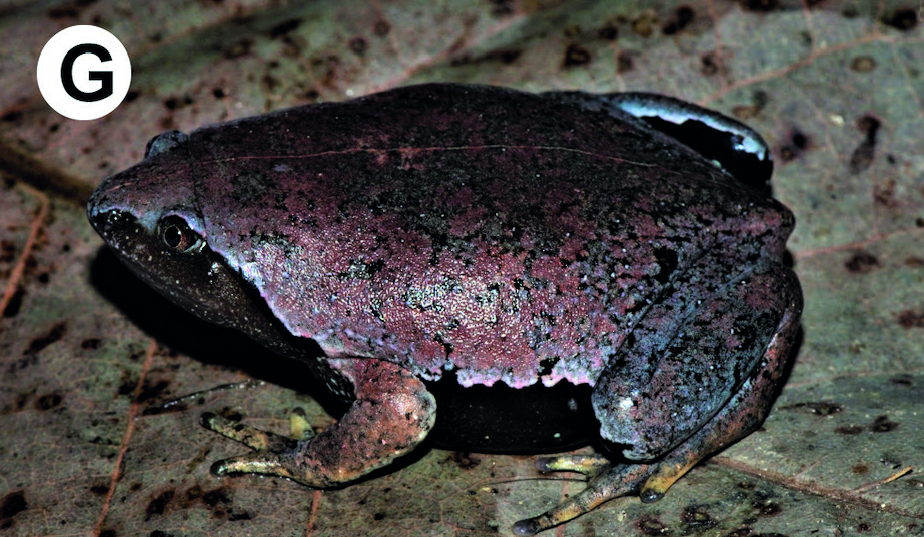
- Amapá, Brazil

Conservation status
- Least Concern (IUCN 3.1)

Scientific classification
- Kingdom: Animalia
- Phylum: Chordata
- Class: Amphibia
- Order: Anura
- Family: Microhylidae
- Genus: Ctenophryne
- Species: C. geayi

Binomial name
- Ctenophryne geayi Mocquard, 1904

Synonyms
- Ctenophryne geagi — incorrect subsequent spelling

= Ctenophryne geayi =

Species of frog

Ctenophryne geayi (common name: brown egg frog, Spanish: sapito apuntado de Geay) is a species of frog in the family Microhylidae. It is widely distributed in the northern parts of South America, in the Guianas (Guyana, Suriname, French Guiana) and in the Amazon Basin in Venezuela, Colombia, Ecuador, Peru, Bolivia, and Brazil. It might actually represent two species.

== Description ==
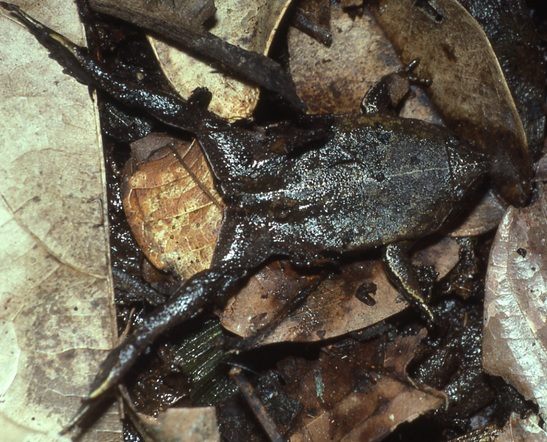
Ctenophryne geayi

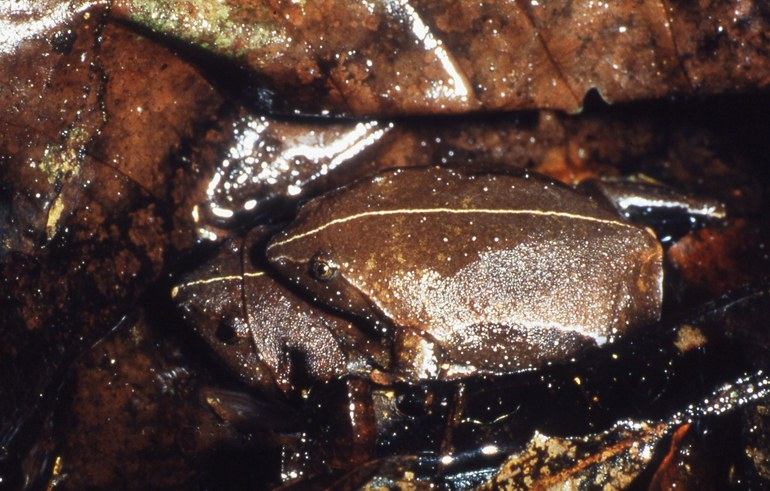
Amplexus

Adult males measure 32–43 mm (1.3–1.7 in) and adult females 42–55 mm (1.7–2.2 in) in snout–vent length.

The body is rotund, and the head is narrower than the body. The snout is blunt from above and rounded, slightly projecting in profile. The tympanic ring is barely visible externally. The fingers have rounded tips. The toes have flattened tips and webbing that is more extensive in males than in females.

Coloration is pale brown dorsally, with darker brown flanks and anterior and posterior surfaces of the thighs. The throat is dark grayish brown, and other ventral surfaces are dark brown with white flecks. A vertebral line might be present. There are two ventral color patterns.

Specimens from the northern and western part of the range have pale flecks or very small spots, no more than 1 mm (0.04 in) in diameter but typically less. Southern specimens have larger spots, at least some of them 1.5 mm (0.06 in) or larger, up to a maximum of about 5 mm (0.2 in).

== Habitat and conservation ==
Ctenophryne geayi occurs near flooded depressions and semi-permanent or seasonal ponds of old growth tropical rainforests at elevations up to 600 m (2,000 ft) above sea level. It is a secretive species that is nocturnal and fossorial, found above ground only during brief explosive periods of reproduction in pools. It can locally suffer from habitat loss but is not overall threatened; it occurs in many protected areas.
