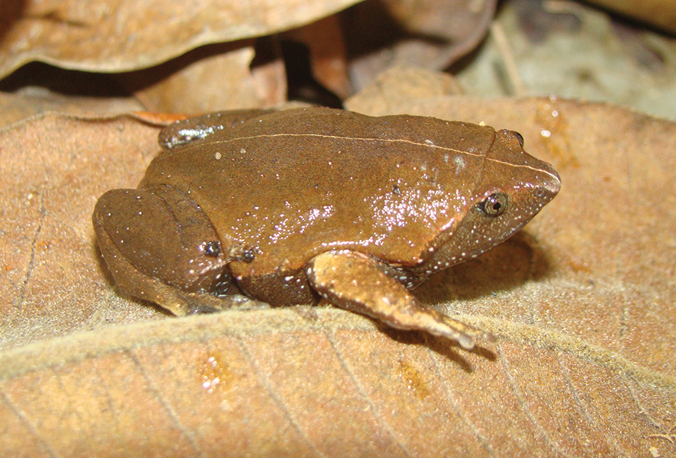
- Ctenophryne geayi

Scientific classification
- Domain: Eukaryota
- Kingdom: Animalia
- Phylum: Chordata
- Class: Amphibia
- Order: Anura
- Family: Microhylidae
- Subfamily: Gastrophryninae
- Genus: Ctenophryne; Mocquard, 1904

Type species
- Ctenophryne geayi Mocquard, 1904

Species
- 6 species (see text)

Synonyms
- Glossostoma Günther, 1901 — junior homonym of Glossostoma LeConte, 1851; Nelsonophryne Frost, 1987 — replacement name for Glossostoma; Melanophryne Lehr and Trueb, 2007

= Ctenophryne =

Genus of amphibians

Ctenophryne is a genus of microhylid frogs. They occur in southern Central America (Costa Rica, Panama) and South America. Their common names are egg frogs and Nelson frogs, the latter applying to species in the formerly recognized Nelsonophryne.

== Taxonomy and systematics ==
As of 2017, Ctenophryne includes two other genera, Nelsonophryne and Melanophryne, in synonymy. The latter might represent valid genera, but molecular analyses could not resolve their relationships in a robust way. Placing Nelsonophryne and Melanophryne in the synonymy of Ctenophryne is an interim measure that avoids paraphyly, until new data might resolve the relationships. When Ctenophryne is defined this way, it is a monophyletic group that is the sister group to all other gastrophrynines.

== Description ==
Ctenophryne range from relatively small Ctenophryne barbatula (female size 26–27 mm (1.0–1.1 in) in snout–vent length) to moderately large Ctenophryne aterrima (female size to 67 mm (2.6 in)). The current definition of the genus is essentially based on molecular phylogenetics rather than morphology.

== Species ==
There are six species:

- Ctenophryne aequatorialis (Peracca, 1904)
- Ctenophryne aterrima (Günther, 1901)
- Ctenophryne barbatula (Lehr and Trueb, 2007)
- Ctenophryne carpish (Lehr, Rodriguez, and Córdova, 2002)
- Ctenophryne geayi Mocquard, 1904
- Ctenophryne minor Zweifel and Myers, 1989
