= Bom Jardim, Maranhão =

Bom Jardim
- Municipality
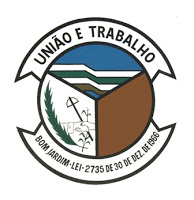
- Flag Coat of arms

- Location in Maranhão

- Location in Brazil
- Coordinates: 3°32′35″S 45°36′33″W
- Country: Brazil
- Region: Nordeste
- State: Maranhão
- Mesoregion: Oeste Maranhense

Population (2020)
  - Total: 41,822
- Time zone: UTC−3 (BRT)

Bom Jardim is a municipality in the state of Maranhão in the Northeast region of Brazil. The population is 41,822. The former mayor of Bom Jardim, Lidiane Leite, was arrested for the embezzlement of US$4 million from the municipality.

The municipality contains a small part of the Baixada Maranhense Environmental Protection Area, a 1,775,035.6 hectares (4,386,208 acres) sustainable use conservation unit created in 1991 that has been a Ramsar Site since 2000. The municipality also contains part of the 271,197-hectare (670,140-acre) Gurupi Biological Reserve, a full protected conservation unit created in 1988. The average annual rainfall is 2,169 millimetres (85.4 in). Temperatures range from 22 to 32 °C (72 to 90 °F) with an average of 27 °C (81 °F).
