= Nhandú River =

- Location within Brazil
- Native name: Rio Nhandú (Portuguese)

Location
- Country: Brazil

Physical characteristics
- Mouth
  - coordinates: 10.017068°S 55.548667°W

Basin features
- River system: Teles Pires

The Nhandú River (Portuguese: Rio Nhandú) is a river in the states of Pará and Mato Grosso, Brazil. It is a tributary of the Teles Pires.

== Course ==
The Nhandú River flows southwest from Pará into Mato Grosso, where it is a right tributary of the Teles Pires. It defines the eastern boundary of the 184,900 hectares (457,000 acres) Cristalino State Park, created in 2000.

== See also ==
- List of rivers of Mato Grosso

== Sources ==
- Parque Estadual Cristalino: Um lugar para se conservar (PDF) (in Portuguese), Cuiabá - MT: Governo de Estado de Mato Grosso: Fundação Estadual do Meio Ambiente - FEMA-MT, 2002, archived from the original (PDF) on 2016-11-03
