= Arrow poison =

Poison applied to arrowheads or darts for hunting or warfare

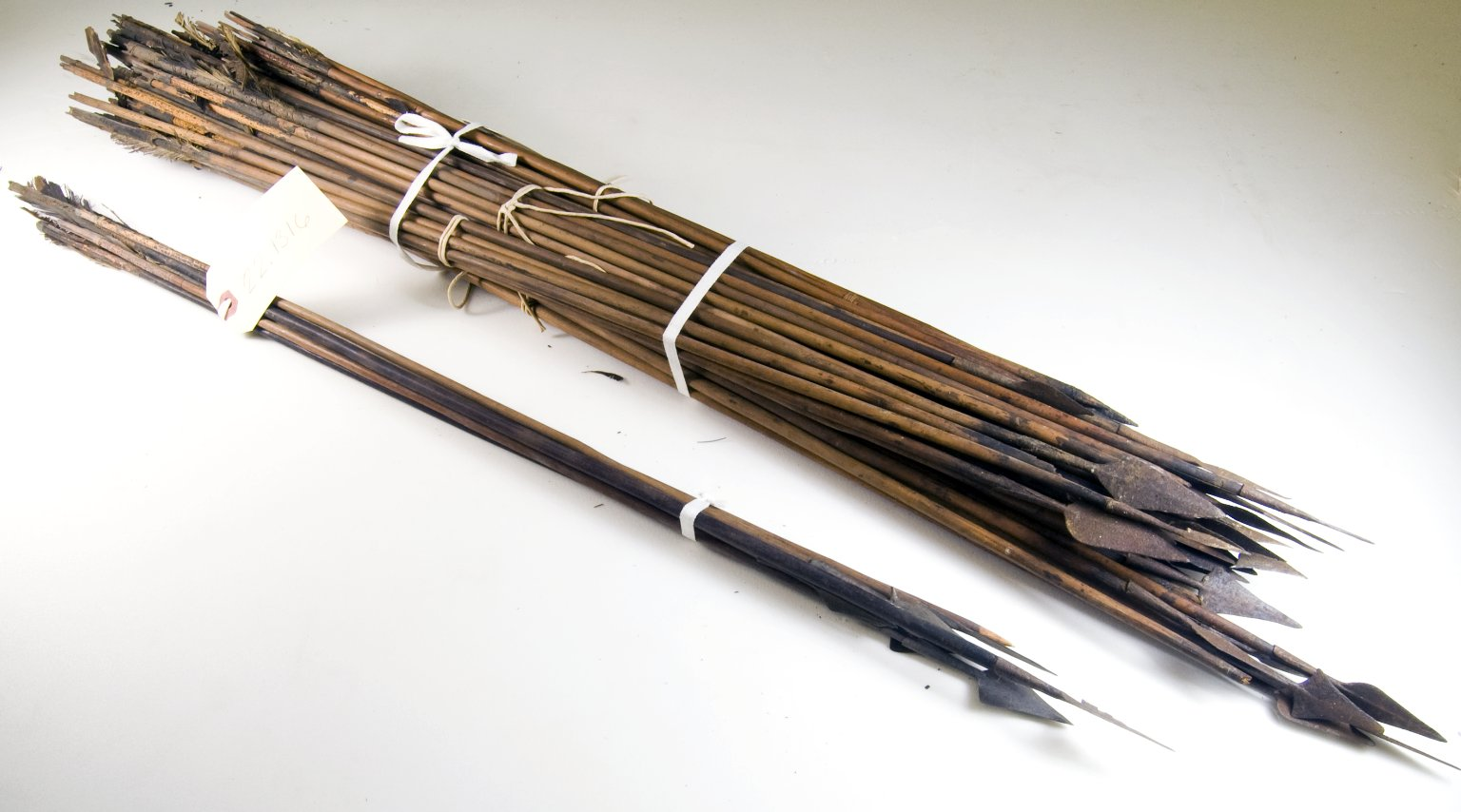
Poisoned arrows exhibited in the Brooklyn Museum.

Arrow poisons are used to poison arrow heads or darts for the purposes of hunting and warfare. They have been used by indigenous peoples worldwide and are still in use in areas of South America, Africa and Asia. Notable examples are the poisons secreted from the skin of the poison dart frog, and curare (or 'ampi'), a general term for a range of plant-derived arrow poisons used by the indigenous peoples of South America.

== History ==
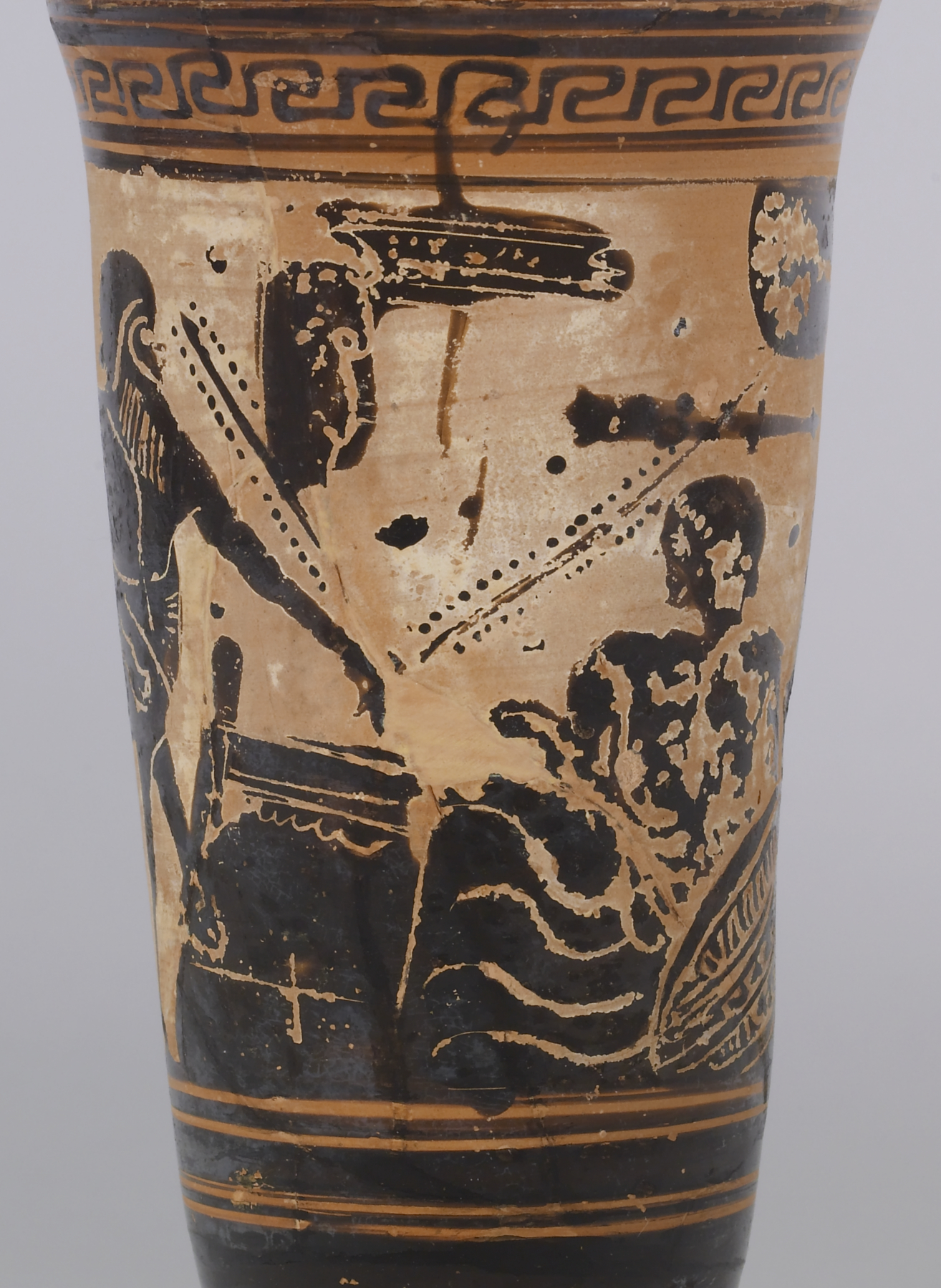
A lekythos depicting the encounter with Herakles and Pholus. The latter was killed by poisoned arrows.

Analysis of organic residue on stone arrowheads found in Umhlatuzana Rock Shelter, KwaZulu-Natal, South Africa showed that poison from tumbleweed was likely used on hunting arrows as early as 60,000 years ago.

Poisoned arrows have featured in mythology, notably the Greek story of Heracles slaying the centaur Nessus using arrows poisoned with the blood of the Lernaean Hydra. The Greek hero Odysseus poisons his arrows with hellebore in Homer's Odyssey. Poisoned arrows also figure in Homer's epic about the Trojan War, the Iliad, in which both Achaeans and Trojans used toxic arrows and spears.

Poisoned arrows were known to be used by many ancient civilizations, including the Gauls, Scythians, and Svans. Ancient Greek and Roman historians describe recipes for poisoning projectiles and historical battles in which poison arrows were used. Alexander the Great encountered poisoned projectiles during his conquest of India (probably dipped in the venom of Russell's viper) and the army of the Roman general Lucullus suffered grievous poison wounds from arrows shot by nomads during the Third Mithridatic War (1st century BC).

In the Kingdom of Kush, arrows were often poison-tipped. There is some indication that poisoned arrows were used in battle against the Romans from 27 BC to 22 BC.

Gregory of Tours claimed that during the reign of Emperor Maximus a Roman army was ambushed and destroyed by the Franks in Germany who used arrows poisoned in herb juices.

The use of poisoned arrows in hunting and warfare by some Native Americans has also been documented. In Colonial Brazil, an Tupinambá shot and killed Portuguese leader Estácio de Sá with a poisoned arrow; the Tamoio people were another Brazilian tribe known to use poisoned arrows, and they were specifically ordered to give up their poisoned arrows when disarmed by the Portuguese.

Over the ages, Chinese warfare has included projectiles poisoned with various toxic substances.

The modern terms "toxic" and "toxin" derive from the ancient Greek word for "bow", toxon, from Old Persian *taxa-, "an arrow". Poisoned arrows are referred to in the Book of Job in the Bible, descriptive of the sufferings experienced by the just man, Job.

== Varieties ==
Arrow poisons around the world are created from many sources:

=== Plant-based poisons ===
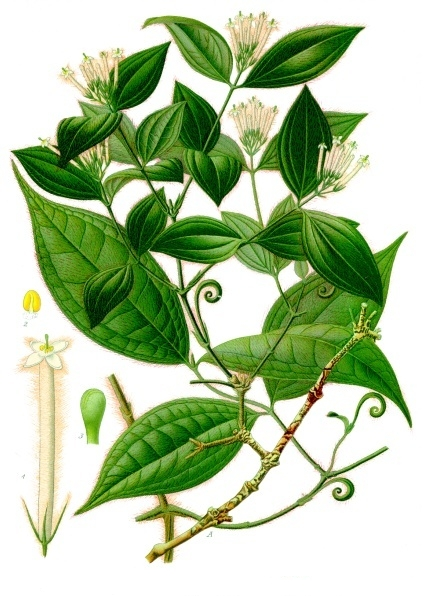
Strychnos toxifera, a plant commonly used in the preparation of curare

- Curare is a generic term for arrow poisons that contain tubocurarine, curarine, quinine, protocurarine and related alkaloids. Most frequently it is derived from the bark of Strychnos toxifera, Strychnos guianensis (family Loganiaceae), Chondrodendron tomentosum or Sciadotenia toxifera (family Menispermaceae). Curare is a competitive antagonist that blocks nicotinic acetylcholine receptors on the post synaptic membrane of the neuromuscular junction. It is a muscle relaxant that causes death by paralyzing the respiratory system, resulting in asphyxiation.
- In Africa, many arrow poisons are made from plants that contain cardiac glycosides, such as Acokanthera (possessing ouabain), oleander (Nerium oleander), milkweeds (Asclepias), or Strophanthus, all of which are in the family Apocynaceae. Inee or onaye is a poison made from Strophanthus hispidus, which contains the cardiac glycoside strophanthin. It is used in sub-Saharan West Africa, particularly in the areas of Togo and Cameroon. Certain species of the genus Mostuea (family Gelsemiaceae) are used as additives to arrow poisons (other ingredients unspecified). The toxic principles of Mostuea are alkaloids, not cardiac glycosides.
- Poisoned arrows and blowgun darts are used widely in the jungle areas of Southeast Asia and South Asia for warfare and hunting. The main plant sources for the poisons are members of the genera Antiaris, Strychnos and Strophanthus. Antiaris toxicaria, a tree of the mulberry and breadfruit family locally known as upas or ancar, is the most commonly used source for arrow poison in various ethnic groups in Indonesia, Malaysia, and the Philippines. The sap or juice of the seeds is smeared on the arrowhead on its own or mixed with other plant extracts. The fast-acting active ingredient (either antiarin, strychnine or strophanthin) attacks the central nervous system causing paralysis, convulsions and cardiac arrest.
- Several species of Aconitum or "aconite," belonging to the buttercup family, have been used as arrow poisons. The Brokpa in Ladakh use Aconitum napellus on their arrows to hunt Siberian ibex; they were in use recently near lake Issyk Kul in Kyrgyzstan. The Ainu and Matagi of northern Japan used an Aconitum paste called surku (スㇽク) to hunt brown bear and sika, applied to arrows fired from either bows or amappo. It was also used by the Butias and Lepchas in Sikkim and Assam. The Chinese used Aconitum poisons both for hunting and warfare.
- The Kalinago of the Caribbean used poisons made from the sap of the manchineel tree (Hippomane mancinella) or sandbox tree (Hura crepitans), both members of the spurge family, Euphorbiaceae.
- Digitoxin has been used for at least 7,000 years as an arrow poison.

=== Animal-based poisons ===
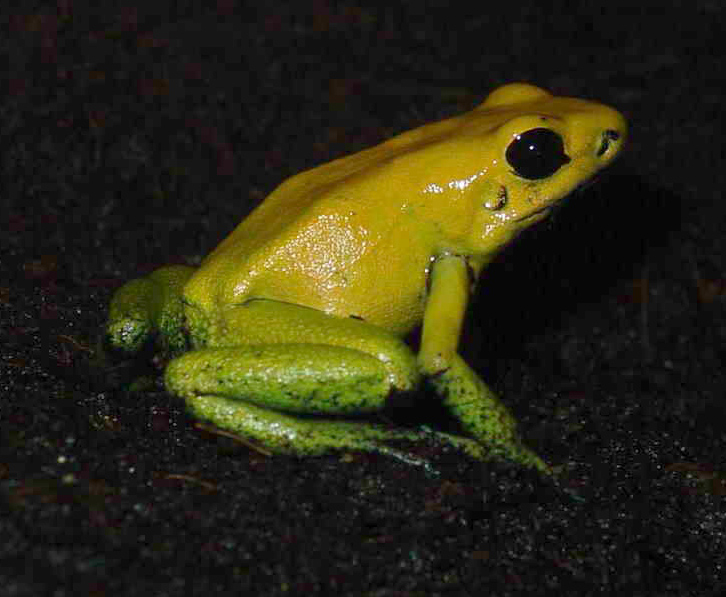
The black-legged dart frog, a species of poison dart frog whose secretions are used in the preparation of poison darts.

- In South America, tribes such as the Noanamá Chocó and Emberá Chocó of western Colombia dip the tips of their blowgun darts in the poison found on the skin of three species of Phyllobates, a genus of poison dart frog. In northern Chocó Department, Phyllobates aurotaenia is used, while P. bicolor is used in Risaralda Department and southern Chocó. In Cauca Department, only P. terribilis is used for dart making. The poison is generally collected by roasting the frogs over a fire, but the steroids in P. terribilis are powerful enough that it is sufficient to rub the dart on the back of the frog without killing it.
- In the northern Kalahari Desert, the most commonly used arrow poison is derived from the larva and pupae of beetles of the genus Diamphidia. It is applied to the arrow either by crushing the larva directly onto the arrow head and mixing it with plant sap to act as a binder, or by mixing a powder made from the dried larva with plant juices and applying that to the arrow tip. The toxin is slow attacking and large animals, including humans, can survive 4–5 days before succumbing to the effects.
- In the United States, Native American tribes used venomous reptiles to provide the poisons required. In the Southwest United States, the Gila monster, being one of the only two venomous lizards, has been used as a source.
- There is evidence of Pacific Island cultures using poison arrow and spear tips. An account from Hector Holthouse's book "Cannibal Cargoes" (on the subject of the Australian Pacific Island Labour Trade) describes a canoe, resting on forks in the sand; within the canoe the body of a man rotting in the sun. The unsealed canoe allowing the putrefaction to collect in a notched shallow bowl in which arrow heads and spear tips are soaked. Wounds with these weapons caused tetanus infection.

=== Preparation ===
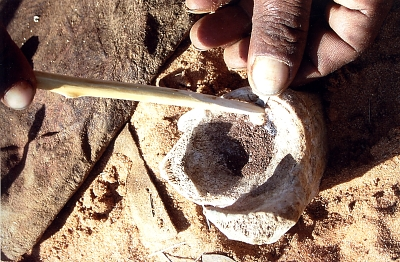
A San preparing arrow poison made from snake bean and Bushman arrow-poison beetles.

The following 17th-century account describes how arrow poisons were prepared in China:

In making poison arrows for shooting wild beasts, the tubers of wild aconitum are boiled in water. The resulting liquid, being highly viscous and poisonous, is smeared on the sharp edges of arrowheads. These treated arrowheads are effective in the quick killing of both human beings and animals, even though the victim may shed only a trace of blood.

== International Humanitarian Law ==
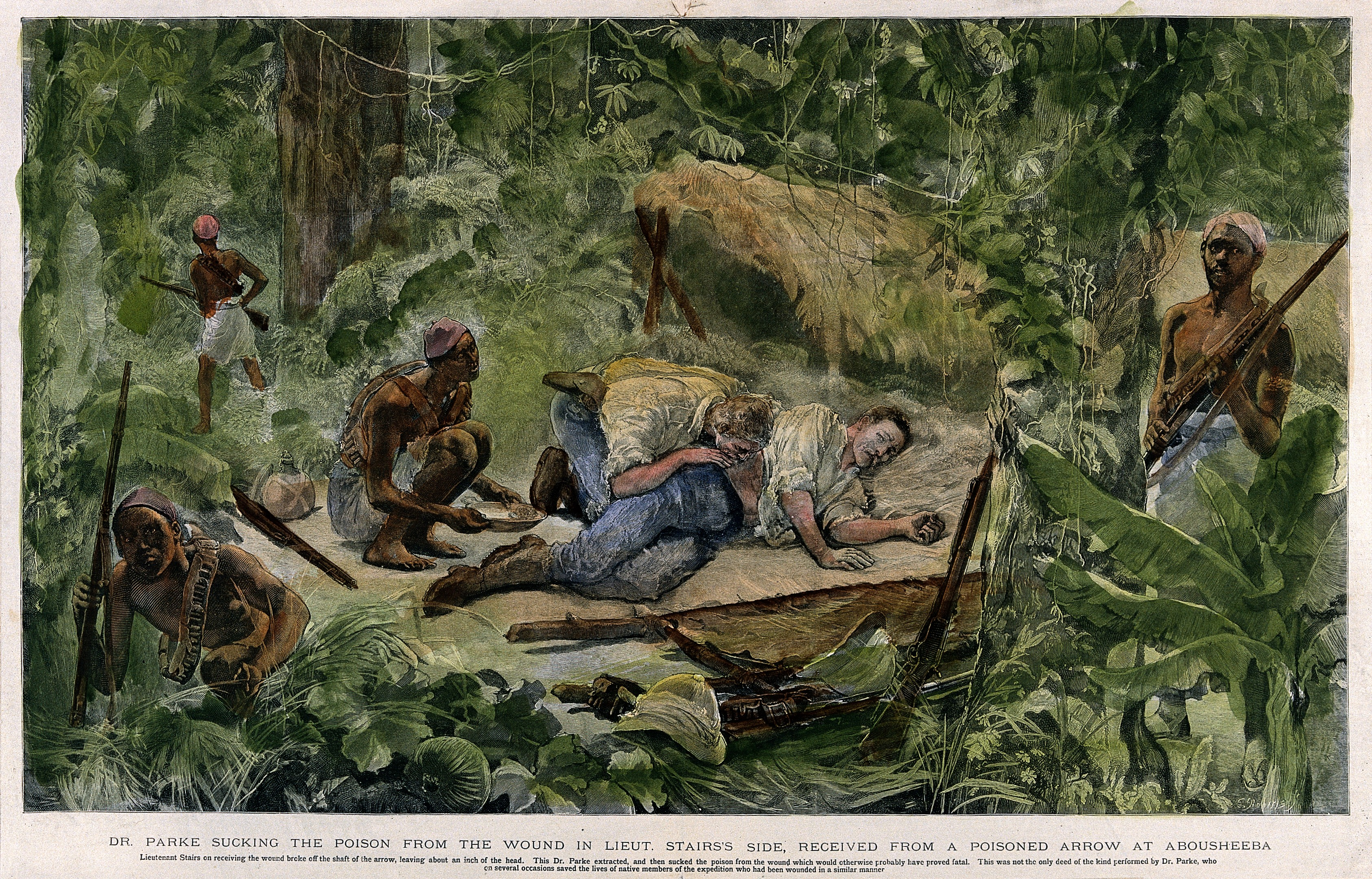
William Grant Stairs being wounded by a poisoned arrow and being tended to by Thomas Heazle Parke.

According to the International Committee of the Red Cross, employment of poisonous weapons is in breach of customary International Humanitarian Law.

== See also ==
- Blowgun
- Bushman poison (disambiguation)
- Fire Arrow
- Fukiya, Japanese blowgun
- Loire style blowgun (French page)
