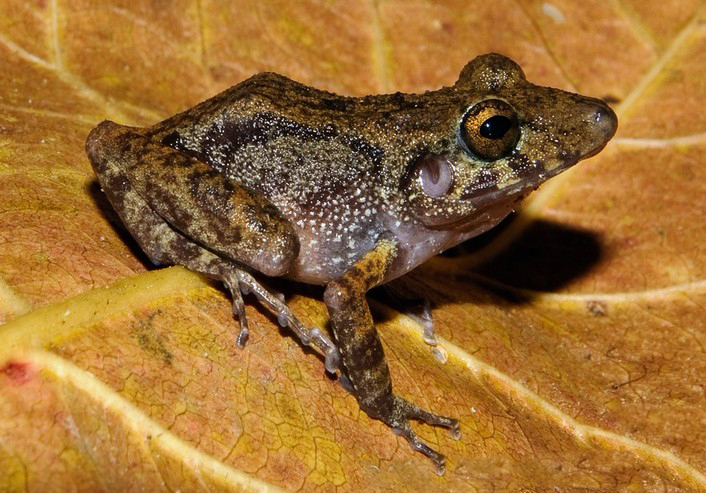

Conservation status
- Least Concern (IUCN 3.1)

Scientific classification
- Kingdom: Animalia
- Phylum: Chordata
- Class: Amphibia
- Order: Anura
- Family: Strabomantidae
- Genus: Pristimantis
- Species: P. gaigei

Binomial name
- Pristimantis gaigei (Dunn, 1931)

Synonyms
- Lithodytes gaigei Dunn, 1931; Eleutherodactylus gaigei (Dunn, 1931); Eleutherodactylus gaigeae (Dunn, 1931) [lapsus]; Pristimantis gaigeae (Dunn, 1931) [lapsus]

= Pristimantis gaigei =

Species of frog

Pristimantis gaigei, also known as the Fort Randolph robber frog or Gaige's rain frog, is a species of frog in the family Strabomantidae. It is found in the Atlantic drainage lowlands from extreme south-eastern Costa Rica to eastern Panama and to central Colombia; it is widely distributed in Colombia west of the Cordillera Oriental. Its natural habitat is primary humid lowland forest, but it also occurs in secondary forest. It is a nocturnal species found under surface debris and in leaf-litter.

Pristimantis gaigei is named after Helen Beulah Thompson Gaige, an American herpetologist.

== Description ==
The maximum snout–vent length attained by males is about 30 mm (1.2 in) and that of females about 43 mm (1.7 in). The species is considered a mimic of poison dart frogs (Dendrobatidae): it has a pair of red, orange, or golden dorsolateral stripes, resembling toxic species Phyllobates aurotaenia and Phyllobates lugubris; some populations of Pristimantis gaigei are sympatric with these species.

== Reproduction ==
This species has axillary amplexus. No male advertisement call has been recorded and the species is presumed to have none. Clutch size in captivity has varied from 22 to 37 eggs measuring about 5 mm (0.20 in) in diameter each. Egg clutches were typically buried in the substrate or laid under cover. Hatching takes place after 28–39 days. Development is direct, and the newly hatched froglets were about 5 mm in length.
