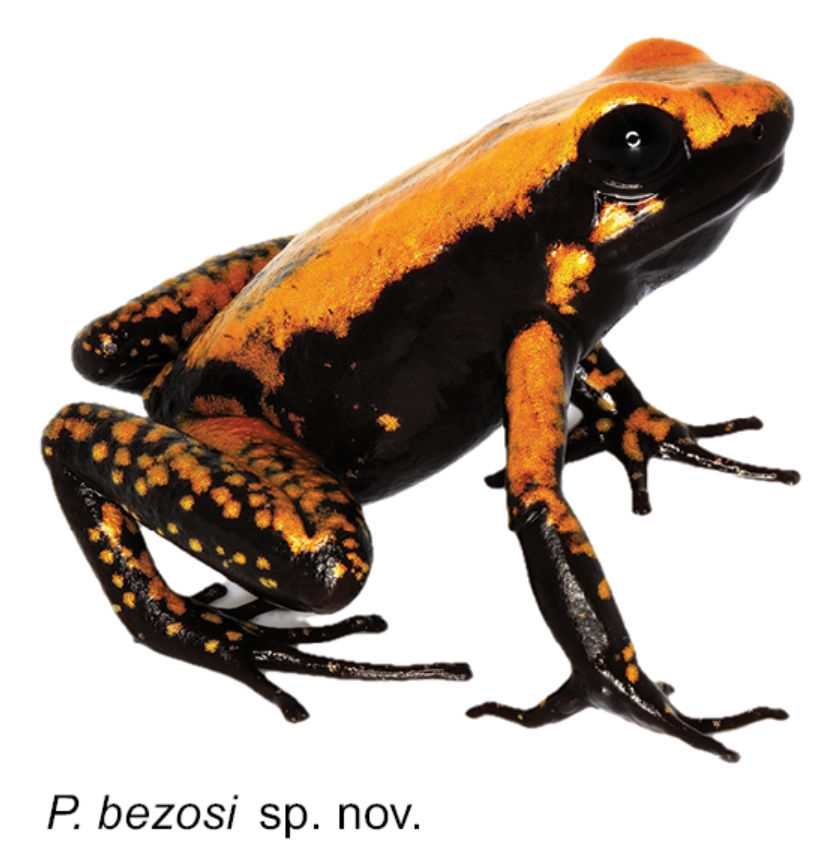

Scientific classification
- Kingdom: Animalia
- Phylum: Chordata
- Class: Amphibia
- Order: Anura
- Family: Dendrobatidae
- Genus: Phyllobates
- Species: P. bezosi

Binomial name
- Phyllobates bezosi Amézquita et al., 2024

= Phyllobates bezosi =

Species of poison dart frog

Phyllobates bezosi is a species of poison dart frog native to Colombia. The frogs are orange, yellow, and black in colour. The species was discovered in a Colombian rainforest, and described in 2024. It was named after Jeff Bezos, and is likely to be endangered.

== Taxonomy ==
Phyllobates bezosi was first described in a 2024 paper, alongside its sister species, Phyllobates samperi. P. bezosi is also a sister species of Phyllobates terribilis.

The holotype of Phyllobates bezosi is an adult male collected from a riverine rainforest in Valle del Cauca, Colombia. It was found amid leaf litter, at an elevation of 700 metres (2,300 ft).

== Etymology ==
Phyllobates bezosi is named after businessman Jeff Bezos, in recognition of his support for environmental causes.

== Distribution ==
Phyllobates bezosi is known only from its type locality, on the Garrapatas River, Colombia.

== Description ==
Adults have a snout to vent length of 31–36 millimetres (1.2–1.4 in).

Phyllobates bezosi can be distinguished from other frogs in its genus by colouration. The dorsal colouration is orange or yellow, with black patches. The legs are black, with orange and yellow patches. The flanks are mostly black. Aduls may have a golden patch on the chest. After metamorphosis, froglets have brightly coloured stripes, though these are absent in adult frogs.

The males exhibit trill-type calls. Each call lasts around 36 milliseconds, and calls are made in a series lasting around 9.5 seconds. A captive male has been observed carrying tadpoles on its back.

== Conservation ==
Phyllobates bezosi is likely to be endangered, due to illegal mining and drug trading in its habitat.
