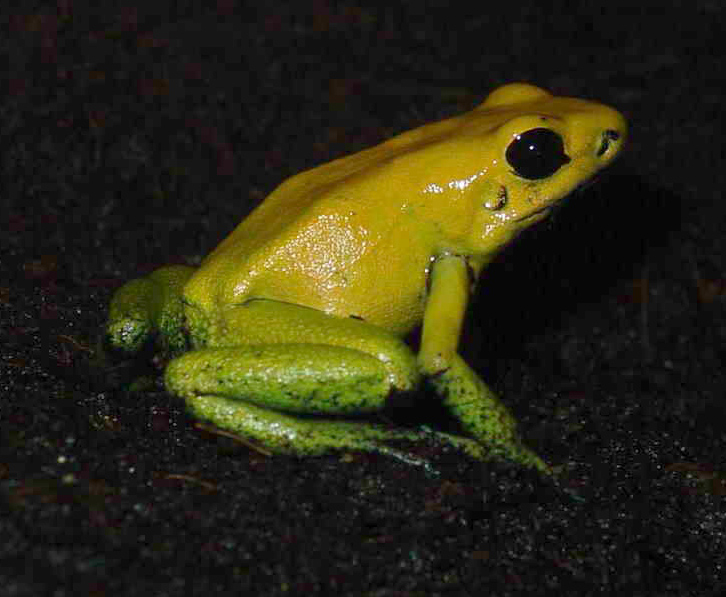

Conservation status
- Endangered (IUCN 3.1)
- CITES Appendix II

Scientific classification
- Kingdom: Animalia
- Phylum: Chordata
- Class: Amphibia
- Order: Anura
- Family: Dendrobatidae
- Genus: Phyllobates
- Species: P. bicolor

Binomial name
- Phyllobates bicolor (Duméril and Bibron, 1841)

= Phyllobates bicolor =

Species of amphibian

Phyllobates bicolor, or more commonly referred to as the black-legged poison dart frog, is the world's second-most toxic dart frog. Under the genus Phyllobates, this organism is often mistaken as Phyllobates terribilis, the golden poison frog, as both are morphologically similar. However, Phyllobates bicolor is identifiable by the yellow or orange body and black or dark blue forelimbs and hindlegs, hence the name black-legged dart frog. Phyllobates bicolor are commonly found in tropical forests of the Chocó region of Colombia. The diurnal frogs live along the rainforest ground near streams or puddles that form. Notably, P. bicolor is a member of the family Dendrobatidae, or poison dart frog. P. bicolor, along with the rest of the Phyllobates species, produce a neurotoxin known as a batrachotoxin that inhibits specific transmembrane channels in cells. Due to this highly deadly toxin that the frogs secrete, many indigenous groups of the Colombian rainforest have extracted the toxins to create poison tipped darts used for hunting. During the breeding period, P. bicolor emits high pitched single notes as a mating call. As in all poison dart frogs, it is common for the father of tadpoles to carry the offspring on his back until they reach a suitable location for the tadpoles to develop. P. bicolor is an endangered species according to the IUCN red list. Currently, deforestation, habitat loss, and pollution pose the biggest threat to the species. Limited conservation efforts have been attempted to prevent further damage to the species. Despite this, there are still institutions such as the Baltimore National Aquarium in Baltimore, Maryland and the Tatamá National Natural Park in Colombia that are engaged in P. bicolor conservation efforts such as captive breeding.

== Description ==
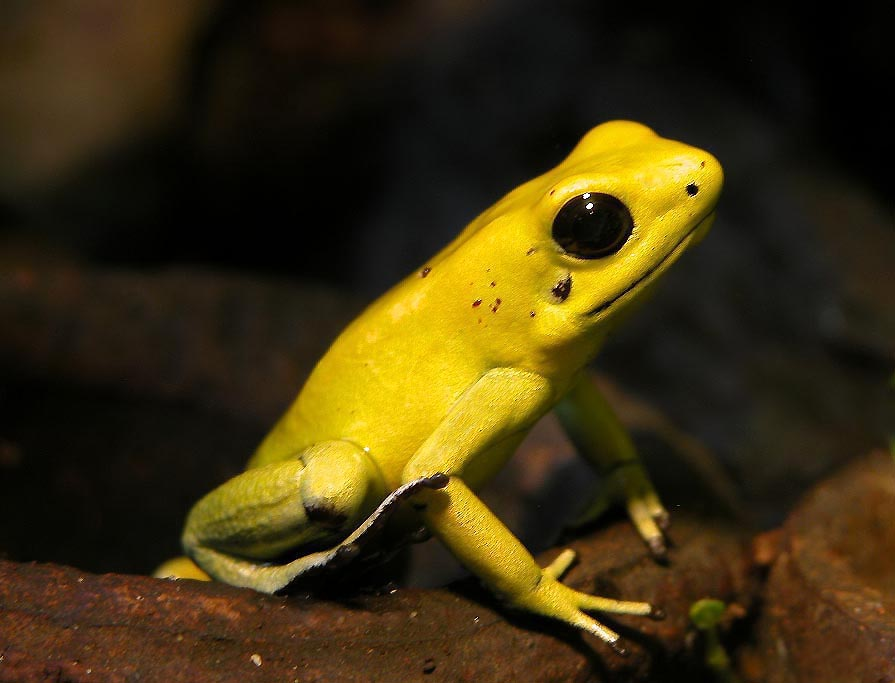
An image of P. terribilis. P. terribilis shares striking morphological similarities to P. bicolor. (See image above)

=== Physical ===
Phyllobates bicolor is one of the largest poison dart frogs. Unlike other species of frogs, the males and females are roughly similar size. Males can reach a length of 45–50 mm from snout to vent, while the slightly larger females reach 50–55 mm in length from snout to vent. The difference in size is an example of sexual dimorphism and influences intrasexual selection by males. P bicolor ranges in color from earthy orange to pure yellow in coloration, often with a blue or black tinge on their legs, hence their name. These bright colors act as an aposematic warning to potential predators by signaling they are poisonous. In addition to being a way to deter predators, the bright colors of P. bicolor may serve a purpose for sexual selection. A brightly colored male, in addition to his call, will attract a female better than a dully colored male would. As coloration increases is vibrancy, the fitness of the organism increases, so the individual can survive better and be selected for reproduction. Coloration in P. bicolor can serve these two purposes at once. P. bicolor are smaller, more slender, and less poisonous than their close relative, Phyllobates terribilis. P. bicolor can also resemble juvenile or subadult P. terribilis frogs. Oftentimes, these two organisms are confused for each other when scientists conduct population surveys. P. bicolor also bears a resemblance to D. leucomelas, particularly the "netted" color morph of D. leucomelas. Similar to other amphibians, P. bicolor experiences ontogenetic changes throughout its stages of life from the time they are tadpoles to mature adults. After emerging from tadpoles, the juveniles frogs are brown or black in color and slowly become more vibrant as they mature.

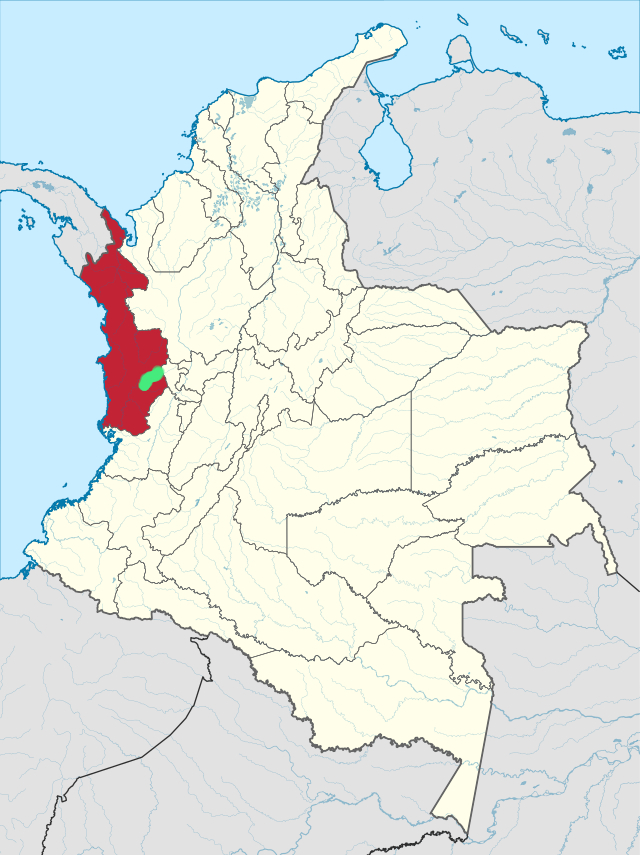
A map of Colombia showing the distribution range of P. bicolor (green) found within the Chocó region of Colombia (red).

=== Species ===
Phyllobates frogs follow an interesting pattern of phenotypic distribution. Across the western South American coast, the frogs exhibit a leapfrog distribution pattern. A leapfrog pattern describes a set of phenotypically similar populations that have been separated by at least one phenotypically unrelated population. P. bicolor, only one of the five species of frog found between Nicaragua and Colombia, are geographically isolated from other species of frog with the exception of P. terribilis. Due to the presence of the Western Andes Mountains and the San Juan river basin, long distance gene flow in-between populations is virtually impossible. This leapfrogging pattern is strong evidence of independent evolution and divergence from a common ancestor. Due to the geographic isolation and lack of long distance gene flow, each population of frog has genetically diverged and gained unique phenotypes from the other populations. This pattern of phenotypic distribution is helpful when looking at the phylogeny of the species when uncovering other mysteries surrounding the species such as the gene that prevents the frog from poisoning itself with its own toxin.

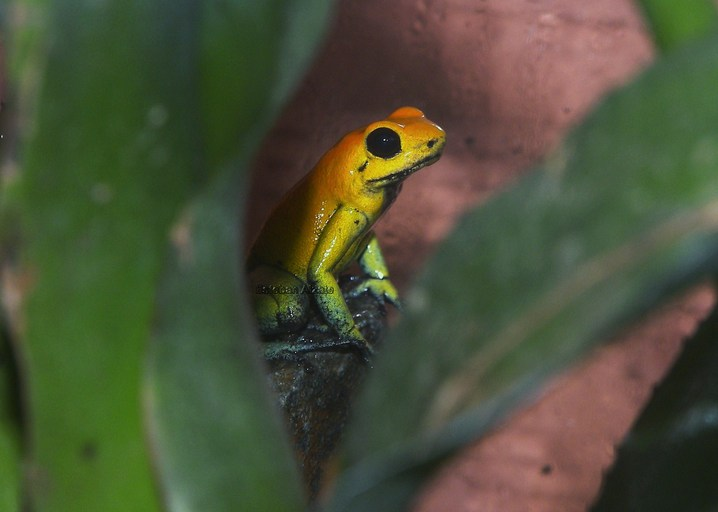
An image of P. bicolor. The pores in the amphibian's skin secretes batrachotoxins.

== Toxicity ==
=== Batrachotoxin ===
While its toxicity is weaker than P. terribilis, P. bicolor is still a highly toxic animal, one of the few frogs confirmed to have caused human fatalities. In their natural habitat, P. bicolor excretes toxins from pores in its skin. The frogs cannot naturally produce the toxin, so they derive the nutrients necessary from their diet and surrounding environment. Between 2-200 micrograms of its poison, a batrachotoxin (BTX), is enough to kill a human being (a reported LD50 of 2.7 ± 0.2 μg/kg.). Research is currently being conducted to determine possible medicinal applications for BTX. The mechanism for paralysis begins at the cellular level. When BTX comes into contact with voltage-gated sodium ion channels, the toxin binds to the protein and permanently activates the channel. Voltage-gated sodium channels are proteins found throughout the body, however the most influential of these are found in neurons. Because the gate is permanently open and cannot close, there is not an action potential gradient to utilize and signals cannot be received by nerves. This lack of signaling is what causes paralysis of muscles, cardiac failure, and respiratory failure which eventually leads to death. There are no known treatments nor antidotes for BTX. These toxins have seemingly no effect on the frogs, however. Experiments have been conducted showing that the amount of BTX on the frog's skin is not in a great enough concentration to depolarize the membrane potential, preventing paralysis. Genetically, BTX immunity has been tested and results imply that BTX immunity is heritable, however no specific gene that expresses this immunity has been identified.

The chemical structure of Batrachotoxin

=== Poison darts ===
Poisons from P. bicolor, P. terribilis, and Phyllobates aurotaenia are often extracted by humans to create poison tipped darts. The Chocó Natives primarily use the blowguns to hunt animals. Other tribes in the Río San Juan basin use a poison derived from plants, however the Chocó Indians are the only tribe who acquire poisons from the Phyllobates species. Of the Phyllobates species, the Chocó choose P. bicolor, P. terribilis and P. aurotaenia to extract poison in one of two methods. In the first method, Chocó Indians rub the tips of the darts against the skin of a live P. terribilis individual. In the second, Chocó Indians extract the poison from the skin of P. bicolor and P. aurotaenia frogs by skewering them with a special stick and held over a fire. This process releases the toxins from within the frog's skin and the tips of the darts are rubbed against the secretion. While this is quite a different approach to poison extraction, the methods are not based upon cultural values. Instead, the methods for extraction are designed with the individual frog's poison concentration in mind, as P. terribilis excretes more concentrated batrachotoxin than P. bicolor or P. aurotaenia.

== Behavior ==
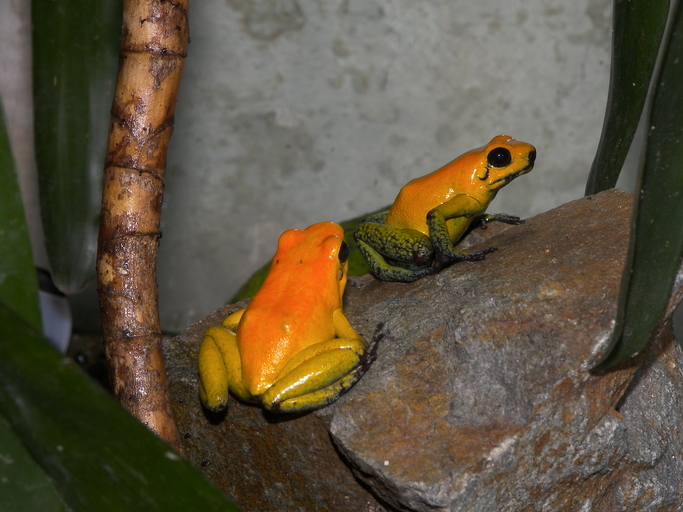
P. bicolor can sometimes be kept in groups in captivity.

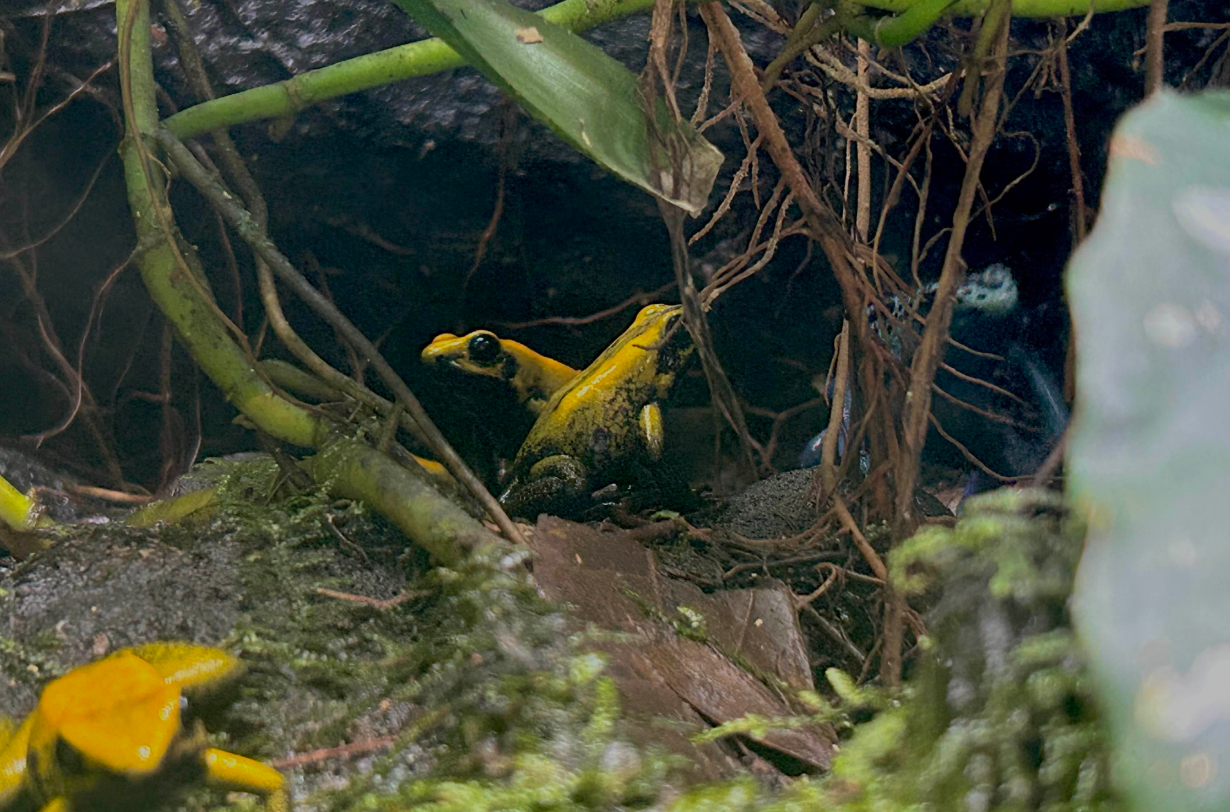

=== General ===
Phyllobates bicolor are diurnal organisms, meaning they are most active during the daytime. This is unique from other amphibians as most species of frog tend to be more active at night. During the day, however, potential predators can better see the warning colors of P. bicolor which protects the frog. Throughout the daytime, P. bicolor move across the rainforest floor in quick rapid hops. These frogs are carnivorous despite their tiny size and tend to forage along the floor for ants, beetles, termites, or other rainforest detritus. Some of these poison dart frogs are solitary and tend to spend their time alone until mating season comes around, however, there have been notable instances of social interaction among organisms. In these cases, a pair or small group of P. bicolor may be formed. During the daytime, P. bicolor can be found around rocks, moss, fallen sticks, and branches. In the rainforest, the ground provides a perfect damp and humid environment for the amphibians. At night, P. bicolor tend to gather around leaf litter.

=== Reproductive ===
During the wet season around September and October, P. bicolor begins to reproduce. Typically, a male will call to any nearby females by trilling or buzzing, creating a series of pulsating and repeating high-pitched notes. If two male calls are emitted, the two males will compete with one another until one emerges victorious and the loser must leave the area in search for another female. Oftentimes, the male will select a suitable location for female oviposition prior to the mate actually depositing her eggs. These locations are typically damp areas such as leaf litter, on certain plants, or under rocks. Common to most species of frogs, P. bicolor fertilizes eggs externally. For this to occur, the male wraps around the female and releases his sperm as the female begins depositing her eggs. The eggs remain protected by one of the parents until they become ready to hatch. This behavior of parental care is common among other species of poison dart frog. At this stage, the male hoists the tadpoles onto his back and begins searching for a location with water to complete the development of the tadpoles. In addition to moving the tadpoles to water, the toxins on the father's back rub off onto the tadpoles, so if a predator were to eat one of the offspring, the predator would get poisoned and the rest of the frogs would be protected. After three weeks in the aquatic environment, the offspring are ready to leave and become terrestrial. During this period, the male fiercely defends his territory and tadpoles from foreign males.

== Conservation ==
=== Threats ===
P. bicolor currently faces a major threat of habitat loss. Significant drivers of habitat loss include deforestation, cattle grazing, mining, pollution, and illegal crop spraying. Deforestation of the rain forest most directly impacts P. bicolor as the process contributes to exposing the frogs that live along the floor of the forest. The removal of trees makes the rainforest floor dry, hot, and without available food for the frogs. Additionally, cattle grazing and unsustainable farming practices cause harm to the land. Again, these processes stress the environment and cause potential harm to the frogs. Mining, pollution, and illegal crop spraying influence the environment as well. Strip mining destroys the landscape, trees, plants, and soil of the rainforest. The loosened topsoil is unfit to host any life, which further harms the frogs as there is no natural cover along these areas to protect the frogs or to lay eggs. Pollution causes death of the frogs as pollutants from industrialization and urbanization of the rainforest are toxic to the frogs.

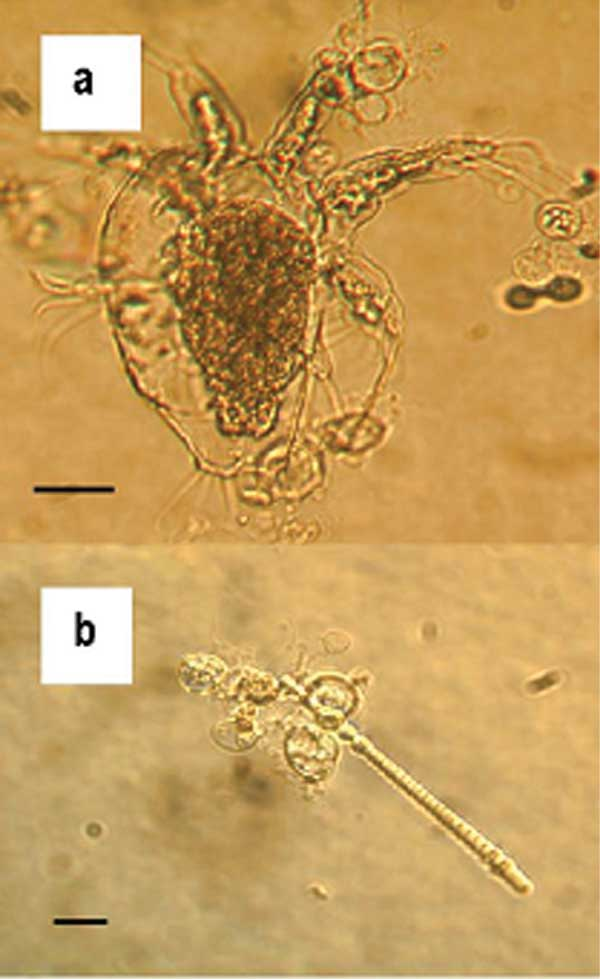
A microscopic image of Batrachochytrium dendrobatidis, the fungi that causes chytridiomycosis.

Invasive species such as Batrachochytrium dendrobatidis, or Bd, endanger the frogs, too. Bd causes the disease chytridiomycosis, a very lethal amphibian skin disease found in many parts of the world, including South America. Bd is an invasive aquatic fungi that causes the skin infections on frogs. The fungi can live in soil or water. When in aquatic environments, Bd spores are motile. The presence of terrestrial and aquatic forms of the fungi present a great threat to P. bicolor. Bd infects the keratinized skin of amphibians and slowly hardens these areas. Since the skin is physiologically active in maintaining a regulated electrolyte balance, respiratory gas exchange, and osmotic imbalance, Bd prevents these vital functions and eventually kills the organism.

=== Efforts ===
There are currently limited conservation efforts in place across the world. Because P. bicolor are similar to P. terribilis, many conservation efforts are applicable to both species. Captive-breeding programs have appeared across the world. In South America, Tatamá National Park in Colombia contains and protects hundreds of endangered and endemic species, including P. bicolor. In the United States, the Baltimore National Aquarium has been engaged in a captive-breeding program. While this has preserved numbers of the species, complications have arisen. Most notably, researchers studying P. bicolor in captivity have noticed a significant reduction of batrachotoxins present on the skin. Without predators in the captive environment, P. bicolor does not need to produce the toxin. This presents significant difficulty to any potential reintroduction plans, as without the toxin to protect the frogs from predators, P. bicolor will have no defense against predation. Additional measures have been taken to prevent the spread of Batrachochytrium dendrobatidis, too. Without an active cure for the disease, preventative measures such as bleaching researchers feet have been put into place to limit the spread of the disease to areas historically known to be Bd free.
