= Batrachotoxin =

- Skeletal formula of batrachotoxin

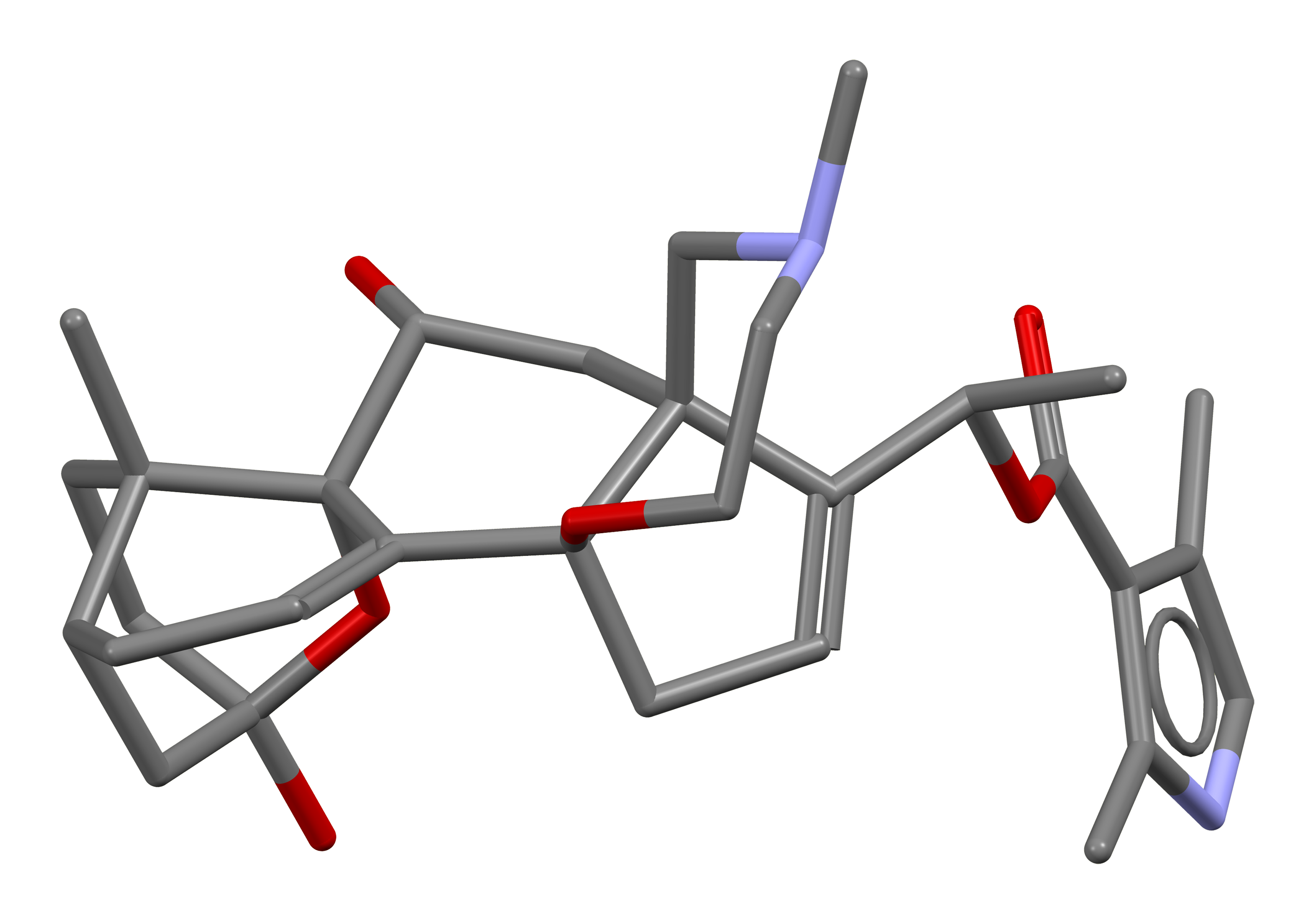
- Stick model of batrachotoxin based on the crystal structure of batrachotoxinin A O-p-bromobenzoate

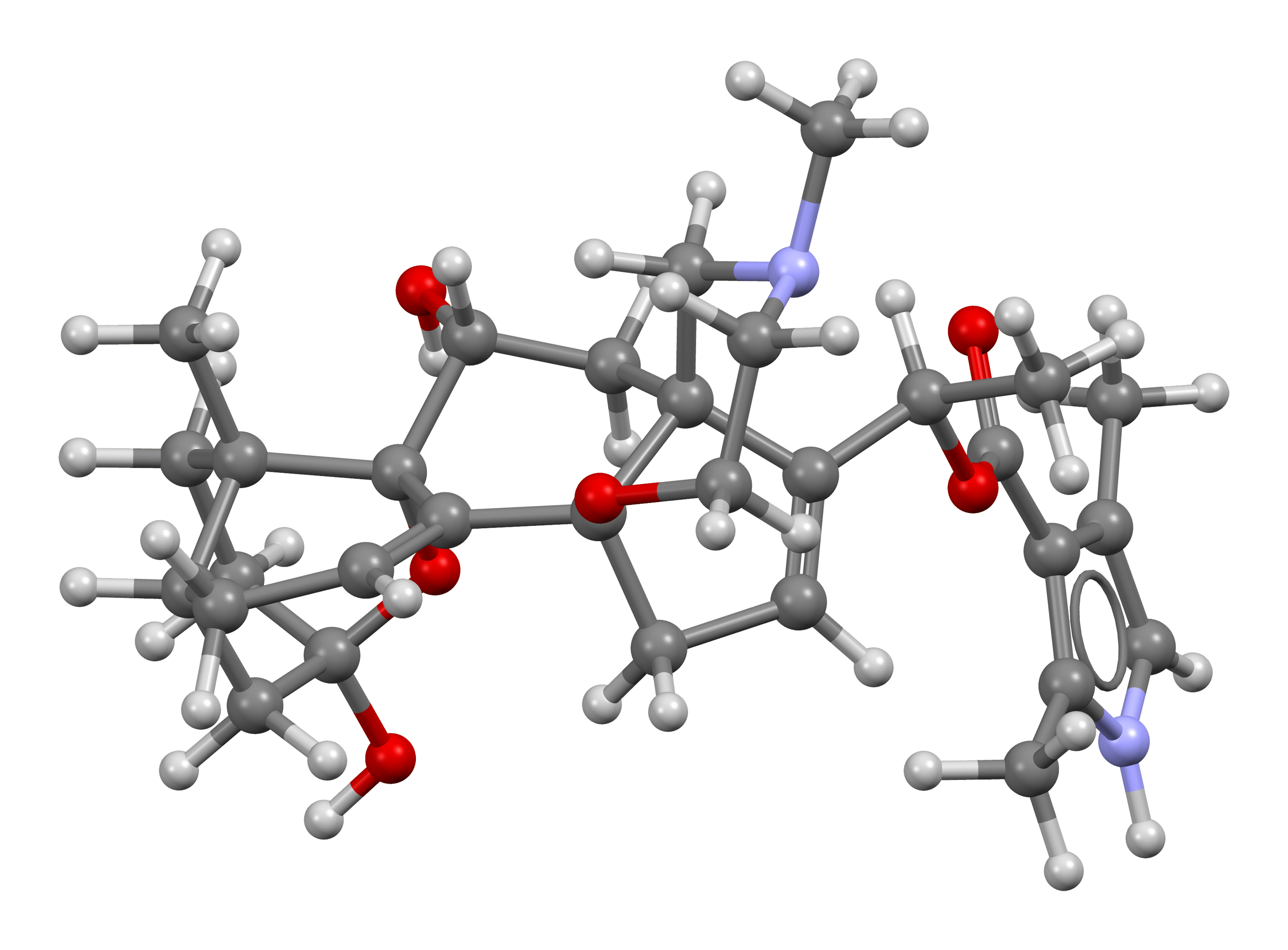
- Ball-and-stick model of batrachotoxin, as above

Names
- Other names 3α,9α-epoxy-14β,18-(2′-oxyethyl-N-methylamino)-5β-pregna-7,16-diene-3β,11α,20α-triol 20α-2,4-dimethylpyrrole-3-carboxylate

Identifiers
CAS Number	23509-16-2
3D model (JSmol)	Interactive image
ChemSpider	10310314
IUPHAR/BPS	2619
PubChem CID	6324647
UNII	TSG6XHX09R
CompTox Dashboard (EPA)	DTXSID50893767
- InChI: InChI=1S/C31H42N2O6/c1-18-16-32-19(2)25(18)26(35)38-20(3)22-8-9-30-23-7-6-21-14-29(36)11-10-27(21,4)31(23,39-29)24(34)15-28(22,30)17-33(5)12-13-37-30/h7-8,16,20-21,24,32,34,36H,6,9-15,17H2,1-5H3/t20-,21+,24+,27-,28-,29+,30-,31-/m0/s1 Key: ISNYUQWBWALXEY-OMIQOYQYSA-N; InChI=1/C31H42N2O6/c1-18-16-32-19(2)25(18)26(35)38-20(3)22-8-9-30-23-7-6-21-14-29(36)11-10-27(21,4)31(23,39-29)24(34)15-28(22,30)17-33(5)12-13-37-30/h7-8,16,20-21,24,32,34,36H,6,9-15,17H2,1-5H3/t20-,21+,24+,27-,28-,29+,30-,31-/m0/s1 Key: ISNYUQWBWALXEY-OMIQOYQYBY
- SMILES: Cc1c[nH]c(C)c1C(=O)O[C@@H](C)C1=CC[C@@]23OCCN(C)C[C@@]12C[C@@H](O)[C@]12O[C@]4(O)CC[C@@]1(C)[C@H](CC=C23)C4

Properties
Chemical formula	C_{31}H_{42}N_{2}O_{6}
Molar mass	538.685 g·mol^{−1}
Density	1.304 g/mL

Hazards
- Occupational safety and health (OHS/OSH)
Main hazards	Highly toxic
- Lethal dose or concentration (LD, LC)
LD_{50} (median dose)	2 μg/kg (mouse, sub-cutaneous)
- Except where otherwise noted, data are given for materials in their standard state (at 25 °C [77 °F], 100 kPa). verify (what is ?) Infobox references

Batrachotoxin (BTX) is an extremely potent cardiotoxic and neurotoxic steroidal alkaloid found in certain species of beetles, birds, and frogs. The name is from the Greek word βάτραχος, bátrachos, 'frog'. Structurally-related chemical compounds are often referred to collectively as batrachotoxins. In certain frogs, this alkaloid is present mostly on the skin. Such frogs are among those used for poisoning darts. Batrachotoxin binds to and irreversibly opens the sodium channels of nerve cells and prevents them from closing, resulting in paralysis and death. No antidote is known.

== History ==
Batrachotoxin was discovered by Fritz Märki and Bernhard Witkop, at the National Institute of Arthritis and Musculoskeletal and Skin Diseases in Bethesda, Maryland. Märki and Witkop isolated the toxic alkaloids fraction from the black-legged poison dart frog and determined its chemical properties in 1963. They isolated four major toxic steroidal alkaloids including batrachotoxin, homobatrachotoxin (isobatrachotoxin), pseudobatrachotoxin, and batrachotoxinin A. Due to the difficulty of handling such a potent toxin and the minuscule amount that could be collected, a comprehensive structure determination involved several difficulties. However, Takashi Tokuyama, who joined the investigation later, converted one of the congener compounds, batrachotoxinin A, to a crystalline derivative and its unique steroidal structure was solved with x-ray diffraction techniques (1968). When the mass spectrum and NMR spectrum of batrachotoxin and the batrachotoxinin A derivatives were compared, it was realized that the two shared the same steroidal structure and that batrachotoxin was batrachotoxinin A with a single extra pyrrole moiety attached. In fact, batrachotoxin was able to be partially hydrolyzed using sodium hydroxide into a material with identical TLC and color reactions as batrachotoxinin A. The structure of batrachotoxin was established in 1969 through chemical recombination of both fragments. Batrachotoxinin A was synthesized by Michio Kurosu, Lawrence R. Marcin, Timothy J. Grinsteiner, and Yoshito Kishi in 1998.

== Toxicity ==
According to experiments with rodents, batrachotoxin is one of the most potent alkaloids known: its intravenous LD_{50} in mice is 2–3 μg/kg. Meanwhile, its derivative, batrachotoxinin A, has a much lower toxicity with an LD_{50} of 1000 μg/kg.

The toxin is released through colourless or milky secretions from glands located on the back and behind the ears of frogs from the genus Phyllobates. When one of these frogs is agitated, feels threatened or is in pain, the toxin is reflexively released through several canals.

Batrachotoxin activity is temperature-dependent, with a maximum activity at 37 °C (99 °F). Its activity is also more rapid at an alkaline pH, which suggests that the unprotonated form may be more active.

=== Neurotoxicity ===
As a neurotoxin, it affects the nervous system. Neurological function depends on depolarization of nerve and muscle fibres due to increased sodium ion permeability of the excitable cell membrane. Lipid-soluble toxins such as batrachotoxin act directly on sodium ion channels involved in action potential generation and by modifying both their ion selectivity and voltage sensitivity. Batrachotoxin irreversibly binds to the Na^{+} channels which causes a conformational change in the channels that forces the sodium channels to remain open. Batrachotoxin not only keeps voltage-gated sodium channels open but also reduces single-channel conductance. In other words, the toxin binds to the sodium channel and keeps the membrane permeable to sodium ions in an "all or none" manner.

This has a direct effect on the peripheral nervous system (PNS). Batrachotoxin in the PNS produces increased permeability (selective and irreversible) of the resting cell membrane to sodium ions, without changing potassium or calcium concentration. This influx of sodium depolarizes the formerly polarized cell membrane. Batrachotoxin also alters the ion selectivity of the ion channel by increasing the permeability of the channel toward larger cations. Voltage-sensitive sodium channels become persistently active at the resting membrane potential. Batrachotoxin kills by permanently blocking nerve signal transmission to the muscles.

Batrachotoxin binds to and irreversibly opens the sodium channels of nerve cells and prevents them from closing. The neuron can no longer send signals and this results in paralysis. Furthermore, the massive influx of sodium ions produces osmotic alterations in nerves and muscles, which causes structural changes. It has been suggested that there may also be an effect on the central nervous system, although it is not currently known what such an effect may be.

=== Cardiotoxicity ===
Although generally classified as a neurotoxin, batrachotoxin has marked effects on heart muscles and its effects are mediated through sodium channel activation. Heart conduction is impaired resulting in arrhythmias, extrasystoles, ventricular fibrillation and other changes which lead to asystole and cardiac arrest. Batrachotoxin induces a massive release of acetylcholine in nerves and muscles and destruction of synaptic vesicles, as well. Batrachotoxin R is more toxic than related batrachotoxin A.

== Treatment ==
Currently, no effective antidote exists for the treatment of batrachotoxin poisoning. Veratridine, aconitine and grayanotoxin—like batrachotoxin—are lipid-soluble poisons which similarly alter the ion selectivity of the sodium channels, suggesting a common site of action. Due to these similarities, treatment for batrachotoxin poisoning might best be modeled after, or based on, treatments for one of these poisons. Treatment may also be modeled after that for digitalis, which produces somewhat similar cardiotoxic effects.

While it is not an antidote, the membrane depolarization can be prevented or reversed by tetrodotoxin (from puffer fish), which is a noncompetitive inhibitor, or saxitoxin. These both have effects antagonistic to those of batrachotoxin on sodium flux. Certain anesthetics may act as receptor antagonists to the action of this alkaloid poison, while other local anesthetics block its action altogether by acting as competitive antagonists.

== Sources ==
Batrachotoxin has been found in four Papuan beetle species, all in the genus Choresine in the family Melyridae; C. pulchra, C. semiopaca, C. rugiceps and C. sp. A.

Several species of bird endemic to New Guinea have the toxin in their skin and on their feathers: the blue-capped ifrit (Ifrita kowaldi), little shrikethrush (aka rufous shrike-thrush, Colluricincla megarhyncha), and the following pitohui species: the hooded pitohui (Pitohui dichrous, the most toxic of the birds), crested pitohui (Ornorectes cristatus), black pitohui (Melanorectes nigrescens), rusty pitohui (Pseudorectes ferrugineus), and the variable pitohui, which is now split into three species: the northern variable pitohui (Pitohui kirhocephalus), Raja Ampat pitohui (P. cerviniventris), and southern variable pitohui (P. uropygialis).

While the purpose for toxicity in these birds is not certain, the presence of batrachotoxins in these species is an example of convergent evolution. It is believed that these birds gain the toxin from batrachotoxin-containing insects that they eat and then secrete it through the skin.

Batrachotoxin has also been found in all described species of the poison dart frog genus Phyllobates from Nicaragua to Colombia, including the golden poison frog (Phyllobates terribilis), black-legged poison frog (P. bicolor), lovely poison frog (P. lugubris), Golfodulcean poison frog (P. vittatus), and Kokoe poison frog (P. aurotaenia). The Kokoe poison frog used to include P. sp. aff. aurotaenia, now recognized as distinct. All six of these frog species are in the poison dart frog family.

The frogs do not produce batrachotoxin themselves. Just as in the birds, it is believed that these frogs gain the toxin from batrachotoxin-containing insects that they eat, and then secrete it through the skin. Beetles in the genus Choresine are not found in Colombia, but it is thought that the frogs might get the toxin from beetles in other genera within the same family (Melyridae), several of which are found in Colombia.

Frogs raised in captivity do not produce batrachotoxin, and thus may be handled without risk. However, this limits the amount of batrachotoxin available for research as 10,000 frogs yielded only 180 mg of batrachotoxin. As these frogs are endangered, their harvest is unethical. Biosynthetic studies are also challenged by the slow rate of synthesis of batrachotoxin.

The native habitat of poison dart frogs is the warm regions of Central and South America.

== Use ==
The most common use of this toxin is by the Noanamá Chocó and Emberá Chocó of the Embera-Wounaan of western Colombia for poisoning blowgun darts for use in hunting.

Poison darts are prepared by the Chocó by first impaling a frog on a piece of wood. By some accounts, the frog is then held over or roasted alive over a fire until it cries in pain. Bubbles of poison form as the frog's skin begins to blister. The dart tips are prepared by touching them to the toxin, or the toxin can be caught in a container and allowed to ferment. Poison darts made from either fresh or fermented batrachotoxin are enough to drop monkeys and birds in their tracks. Nerve paralysis is almost instantaneous. Other accounts say that a stick siurukida ("bamboo tooth") is put through the mouth of the frog and passed out through one of its hind legs. This causes the frog to perspire profusely on its back, which becomes covered with a white froth. The darts are dipped or rolled in the froth, preserving their lethal power for up to a year.

== See also ==
- Tetrodotoxin, a toxin that works in the opposite way of batrachotoxin

== General and cited references ==
- Daly, J. W.; Witkop, B. (1971). "Chemistry and Pharmacology of Frog Venoms". In Bücherl, W.; Buckley, E. E.; Deulofeu, V. (eds.). Venomous Animals and Their Venoms. Vol. 2. New York: Academic Press. LCCN 66014892. OCLC 299757.
