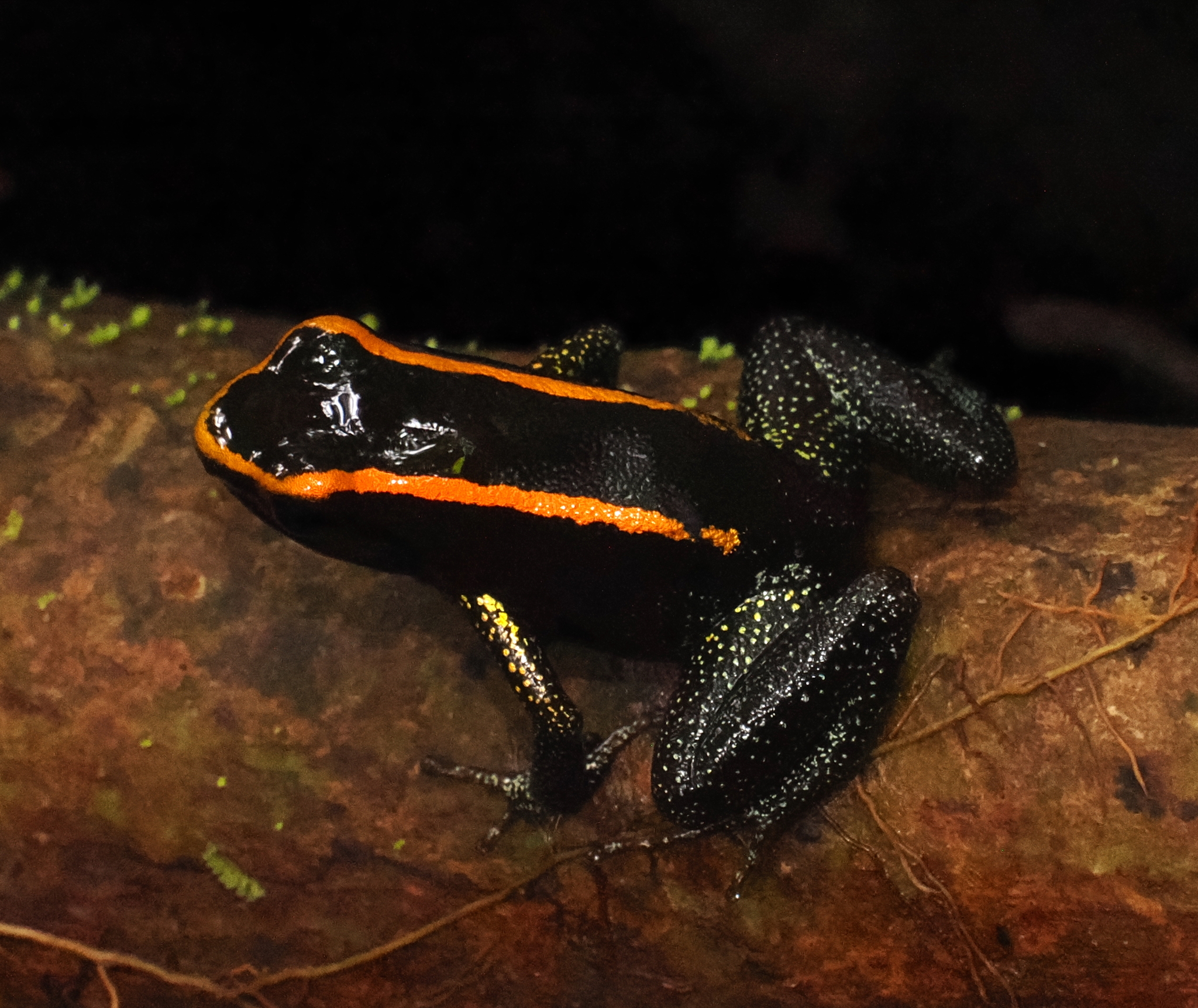

Scientific classification
- Kingdom: Animalia
- Phylum: Chordata
- Class: Amphibia
- Order: Anura
- Family: Dendrobatidae
- Genus: Phyllobates
- Species: P. samperi

Binomial name
- Phyllobates samperi Amézquita et al., 2024

= Phyllobates samperi =

Species of amphibian

Phyllobates samperi, formerly known as sp. aff. aurotaenia, is a species of hypertoxic poison dart frog, once cited as the "red" form of Phyllobates aurotaenia. It resembles in size and to some extent in colouration to P. aurotaenia, but genetically it is the sister species of the "terrible" frog P. terribilis. It can be distinguished from P. aurotaenia by the absence of abundant blue or silver specks or marbling in the venter and limbs, its uniform black or bluish-black body, and its orange or red, rather than green or yellow, stripes.

The species was named to honour Colombian biologist Cristian Samper, for his lasting impact on the world of conservation, overseeing initiatives that span across 65 countries. He is considered a respected figure in the intersection of science, governance, and activism.

== Distribution ==
The species is known to occur in the wet forests along the lower San Juan and Dagua river basins in the vicinities of Buenaventura, Valle del Cauca, Colombia, extending eastwards to the foothills of the Cordillera Occiental, but not surpassing elevations above 200 m (660 ft) above sea level. The northern limit of its distribution range remains unclear, since the medium and lower San Juan basin remain are poorly explored regarding dendrobatid frogs.

The known distribution range of this species includes seven localities enclosed within a ~1,000 km^{2} (400 sq mi) polygon, where deforestation due to agriculture, the expansion of urban Buenaventura, and gold mining operations will certainly reduce the amount and quality of habitat. The species has been thus considered to be Vulnerable but a formal assessment is still missing.

== Toxicity ==
All Phyllobates species are considered highly toxic, or hypertoxic, and this species is no exception. Its skin contains batrachotoxins, extremely potent neurotoxic alkaloids. Indeed, some species of Phyllobates remain the only known to be formerly used by Chocó indigenous people in western Colombia to poison blowgun darts. When in contact with the skin, batrachotoxins seep through open wounds and, in some cases, skin pores, and prevent nerves from transmitting impulses, leaving the muscles in an inactive state of contraction. This can lead to heart failure or fibrillation. Some native people use this poison to hunt by coating darts with the frogs' poison. Alkaloid batrachotoxins can be stored by frogs for years after the frog is deprived of the food-based source, and such toxins do not readily deteriorate, even when transferred to another surface. Chickens and dogs have died from contact with a paper towel on which the more toxic P. terribilis had walked.
