= Mint poison dart frog =

Mint poison dart frog may refer to:

- Green and black poison dart frog (Dendrobates auratus) or mint poison frog, a medium-sized poison dart frog from Central and South America
- Golden poison frog (Phyllobates terribilis), especially the mint green morph, a large-sized poison dart frog endemic to Colombia
