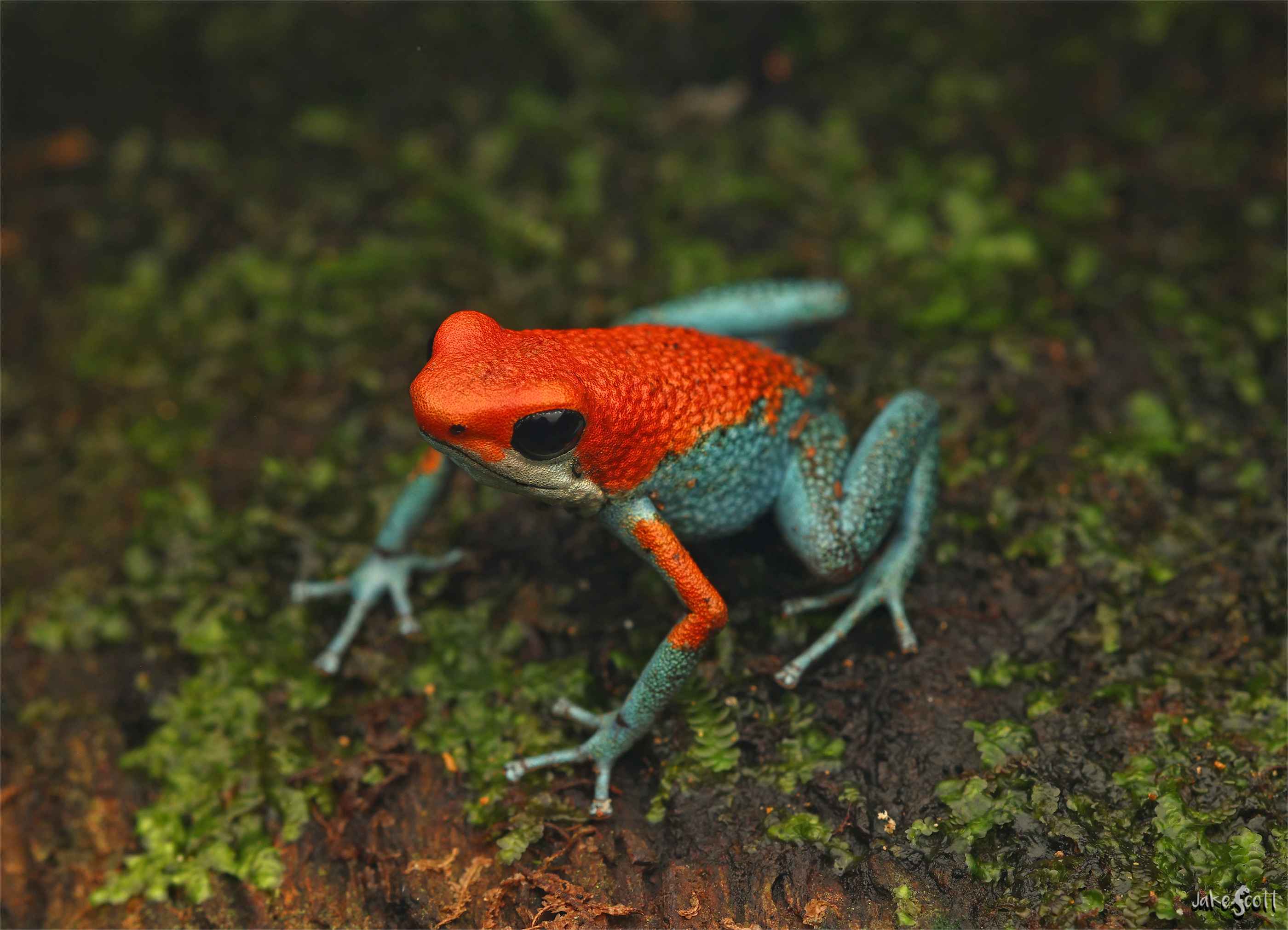

Conservation status
- Vulnerable (IUCN 3.1)

Scientific classification
- Kingdom: Animalia
- Phylum: Chordata
- Class: Amphibia
- Order: Anura
- Family: Dendrobatidae
- Genus: Oophaga
- Species: O. granulifera

Binomial name
- Oophaga granulifera (Taylor, 1958)

Synonyms
- Dendrobates granuliferus Taylor, 1958; Dendrobates granulifer Taylor, 1958; Oophaga granuliferus (Taylor, 1958)

= Granular poison frog =

Species of amphibian

The granular poison frog or granular poison arrow frog (Oophaga granulifera) is a species of frog in the family Dendrobatidae, found in Costa Rica and Panama. Originally described as Dendrobates granuliferus, it was moved to Oophaga in 1994. Its natural habitats are tropical humid lowland forests; it is threatened by habitat loss.

== Description ==
The granular poison frog is a small frog with slender limbs growing to about 20 mm (0.8 in). Its skin is finely granulated and its colour is typically bright orange head, body and upper arms and bluish-green underparts, legs and lower arms. In the vicinity of Quepos, Costa Rica, there is a colour morph in which the orange colour is replaced with olive green.

== Distribution and habitat ==
The granular poison frog is native to Costa Rica and Panama. Its range extends from southwestern Costa Rica through the adjacent area of south-western Panama at heights of up to 100 m (328 ft) above sea level. It also occurs in Piedras Blancas National Park in south-eastern Costa Rica. It inhabits the leaf litter of the floor of humid low altitude forests.

== Behaviour ==
The granular poison frog is a diurnal terrestrial species. Breeding takes place in the rainy season and the female lays groups of three or four eggs in curled up dead leaves, under stones, in twig forks and in leaf axils just above the ground. The male guards the eggs and keeps them moist with his urine. When they hatch, the female carries the tadpoles singly to temporary water bodies such as hollows in trees, leaf axils of species such as Dieffenbachia and to bromeliads, at heights of a metre or two off the ground. The volume of water in these cavities averages 2.4 ml (0.084 imp fl oz; 0.081 US fl oz). The female feeds the tadpoles on an ongoing basis by laying unfertilised eggs in the water bodies.

The frog is an aposematic animal, and it uses poison only for self-defense from predators. Its bright colors are used as a warning signal to all possible predators. Experimental studies in Costa Rica suggest the male granular poison frog spends the majority of its time and energy defending its calling site. These warning signals are more vocal (acoustic) than visual. If an encroaching male dared to approach too closely, a fight could ensue.

== Status ==
The IUCN has listed this species as being "Vulnerable" because its range is relatively small, its numbers seem to be declining and it is threatened by destruction of its rainforest habitat.

Threats to this species include habitat loss from agriculture for palm oil, bananas, and pineapples and associated pesticides. Capture for sale in the international pet trade may also cause local declines.

This frog's range includes some protected parks: Reserva Forestal Golfo Dulce, Refugio de Vida Silvestre Golfito, and Refugio de Vida Silvestre Boracayán.
