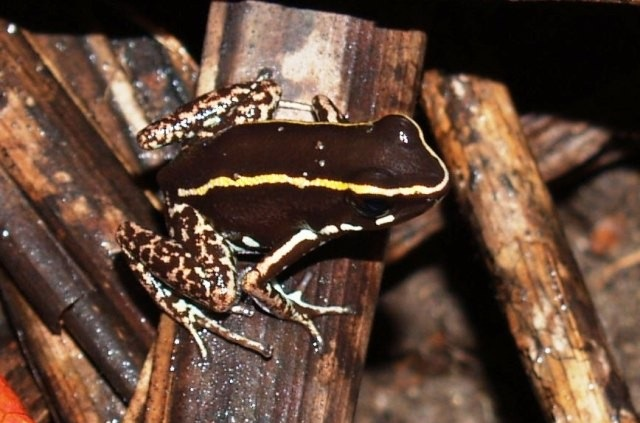

Conservation status
- Least Concern (IUCN 3.1)
- CITES Appendix II

Scientific classification
- Kingdom: Animalia
- Phylum: Chordata
- Class: Amphibia
- Order: Anura
- Family: Dendrobatidae
- Genus: Phyllobates
- Species: P. lugubris

Binomial name
- Phyllobates lugubris (Schmidt, 1857)
- Distribution of Phyllobates lugubris

Synonyms
- Dendrobates lugubris Schmidt, 1857; Hylaplesia lugubris (Schmidt, 1857); Phyllobates beatriciae Barbour and Dunn, 1921

= Lovely poison frog =

Species of amphibian

The lovely poison frog or lovely poison-arrow frog (Phyllobates lugubris) is a species of frog in the family Dendrobatidae. It is found on the Caribbean versant of Central America from southeastern Nicaragua through Costa Rica to northwestern Panama, with one record just west of the Panama Canal. Populations from the Pacific versant, formerly included in this species, are now identified as Phyllobates vittatus.

== Description ==
Adult males measure 18.5–21 mm (0.73–0.83 in) and females 21–24 mm (0.83–0.94 in) in snout–vent length. Maxillary teeth are present. The dorsum is black with a pair of dorsolateral stripes, typically pale yellow to gold or orange, running along the sides of the dorsum from near the hindlimbs to the snout. The limbs are usually mottled with yellow–greenish yellow. The ventral surfaces are mottled with extensive black pigment, often to an extent that gives nearly solid black appearance. While P. lugubris is normally toxic like other related species, some populations in Central America are not known to be toxic.

== Reproduction ==
The male frog finds a concealed perch, such as in a watery area surrounded by vegetation. He then calls to the female frog. The female frog lays eggs on dry leaf litter. The male frog cares for the eggs, protecting them from dehydration via hydric brooding. After the eggs hatch, the male frog carries the tadpoles on his back to streams, where they complete development.

== Habitat and conservation ==
Phyllobates lugubris inhabits humid lowland forests (marginally the premontane forests) at elevations of 10–601 m (33–1,972 ft) above sea level. It can also occur in secondary growth and plantations. It is diurnal and terrestrial. Adult frogs are often found by rocky sections of forest streams.

General habitat loss and pollution are potential threats to this species. Chytrid fungus, Batrachochytrium dendrobatidis, has been detected in museum specimens but its impact on natural populations is unknown. Phyllobates lugubris is sometimes present in the pet trade, with some illegal collection occurring. It is listed in the CITES Appendix II. It is present in several protected areas.
