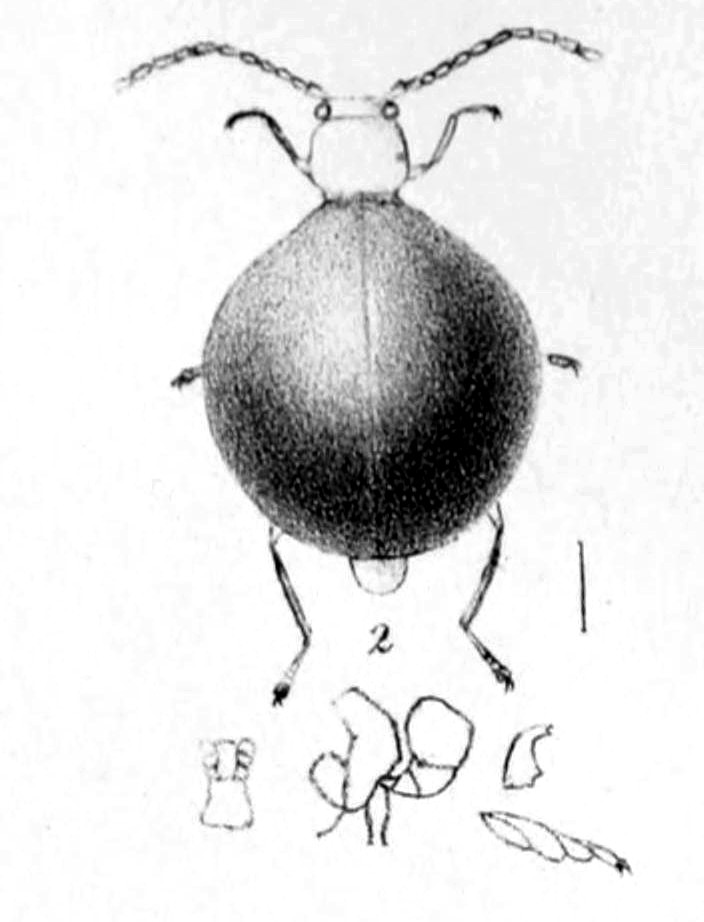
- Choresine advena

Scientific classification
- Domain: Eukaryota
- Kingdom: Animalia
- Phylum: Arthropoda
- Class: Insecta
- Order: Coleoptera
- Suborder: Polyphaga
- Infraorder: Cucujiformia
- Family: Melyridae
- Subfamily: Malachiinae
- Tribe: Carphurini
- Genus: Choresine; Pascoe, 1860

= Choresine =

Genus of beetles

Choresine is a genus of beetles that belong to the family Melyridae. This genus of beetle is known to have high levels of batrachotoxins and is believed to be a possible toxin source for pitohui and blue-capped ifrit birds in New Guinea. Collections from Herowana in the Eastern Highlands Province that tested positive for batrachotoxins included the more abundant C. pulchra, the less abundant C. semiopaca and the two infrequent C. rugiceps and C. sp. A, the latter as yet unnamed. The locals advise against allowing these beetles to touch the eyes or sweaty face as a severe burning sensation can result. These species are all described as having metallic blue-violaceous elytra and a yellow and blackish pronotum. The name "nanisani" is used by villagers in Herowana equally for this group of insects, the numbing, tingling, burning sensation they cause and the blue-capped ifrit.

The hypothesis that Phyllobates frogs in South America obtain batrachotoxins from related genera of the Melyridae (Choresine does not occur there) has not been tested due to the difficulty of field-work in Colombia.

== Species ==
- Choresine advena Pascoe, 1860
- Choresine buruensis Champion, 1923
- Choresine magnioculata Wittmer, 1973
- Choresine moluccana Champion, 1923
- Choresine neogressittiana Wittmer, 1973
- Choresine nigroviolacea Champion, 1923
- Choresine pulchra (Pic, 1917)
- Choresine reductorugata Wittmer, 1973
- Choresine rufiventris Wittmer, 1973
- Choresine rugiceps Wittmer, 1973
- Choresine semiopaca Wittmer, 1973
- Choresine sp. A, as yet unnamed
