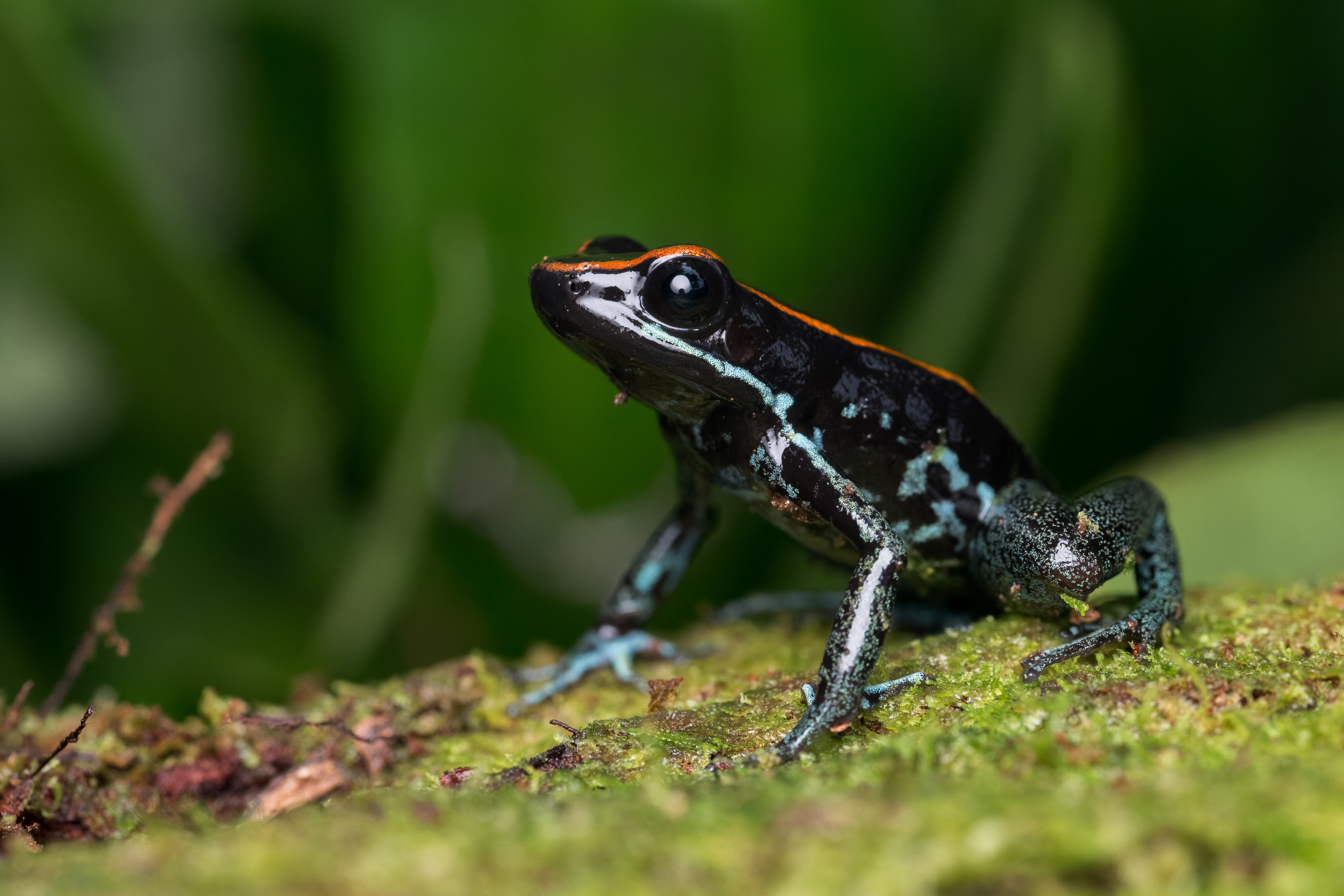

Conservation status
- Vulnerable (IUCN 3.1)
- CITES Appendix II

Scientific classification
- Kingdom: Animalia
- Phylum: Chordata
- Class: Amphibia
- Order: Anura
- Family: Dendrobatidae
- Genus: Phyllobates
- Species: P. vittatus

Binomial name
- Phyllobates vittatus (Cope, 1893)

Synonyms
- Dendrobates tinctorius vittatus Cope, 1893

= Golfodulcean poison frog =

Species of amphibian

The Golfodulcean poison frog or Golfodulcean poison-arrow frog (Phyllobates vittatus) is a species of frog in the family Dendrobatidae endemic to Costa Rica.

== Poison ==
Like all members of the genus Phyllobates, Golfodulcean poison frogs have highly potent neurotoxic alkaloid poisons in their skin. The neurotoxin is called batrachotoxin and the P. vittatius and P. ligubris are considered non-toxic because they have low concentrations of this alkaloid. (Protti‐Sánchez et al., 2019). While it is only the fourth-most toxic of the genus, the Golfodulcean poison frog is still a highly toxic animal. Its poison causes severe pain, followed by tonic-clonic seizures and paralysis if a large enough dose of the toxin is administered. The frog, for protection, advertises its toxin with its multi-coloured body. Because it is of comparatively large size for a poison dart frog, the Golfodulcean poison frog can store a large amount of poison in its skin. Captive examples lack the toxin, which suggests they do not manufacture the poison themselves, but instead acquire it from a species of insect or other small invertebrate on which they feed.

Scientists have not determined the batrachotoxin source for any species of the genus Phyllobates, although toxic birds from New Guinea likely get batrachotoxin from a small beetle of the family Melyridae.

== Description ==
P. vittatus is a fairly large poison frog, reaching a length of 3.5 cm in adulthood, with females typically being larger than males. They are more smooth-bodied than other species of the genus, having almost perfectly sloping backs. Unlike the related P. bicolor and P. terribilis, their shoulder blades are usually not visible beneath their skin, giving the frogs the appearance of being overweight. The frog's color is black, but it may appear to glitter due to chemical pigments in the skin. Its legs are mottled blue, and the sides often have a marble pattern of blue or green. One of the most distinctive features of P. vittatus are the two stripes running down its back for which it was named. These stripes are usually fire orange, but they may also be golden, yellow, or green, and extend from just above the cloaca to the end of the frog's nose.

== Habitats ==
Its natural habitats are primary lowland moist and wet primary and secondary forests at elevations of 20–550 m (66–1,804 ft) above sea level. It is diurnal and terrestrial species associated with streams. Eggs are usually laid on leaves above the ground.

== Reproduction ==
During the breeding season, the female frog lays eggs every one or two weeks. She lays 7 to 21 eggs per clutch. The female frog lays eggs on leaves. They eggs take from a few days to a week to hatch. The tadpoles are dark brown in color. The male frog cares for the eggs, preventing dehydration via hydric brooding. After they hatch, he sits next to the hatched eggs and stamps the ground with his feet. Then the tadpoles climb onto his back. This takes about ten minutes.

The male frog carries the tadpoles to water. This may take 1–2 days. He may take them to a puddle, a pool of water in a palm leaf, or a water-filled tree hole. The tadpoles become frogs after about 45 days. The froglets become sexually mature after ten months.

== As pets ==
Golfodulcean poison frogs are communal animals, and have recently become available in the pet trade. They can be kept in a vivarium measuring about 100x60x60 cm, to grant the frogs both space to move around on the ground and space to climb. A clean, mossy substrate should be provided and, optionally, a carpet of leaves. However, care must be taken to ensure that the leaves are completely unblemished, as many parasitic fungi are lethal to amphibians. Phyllobates frogs climb by sticking to leaves with their adhesive toe pads, in a similar manner to geckos, and the climbing space must be smooth and vertical. Phyllobates frogs are more than capable of climbing out of unsecured vivaria, so their vivaria must be completely sealed.
