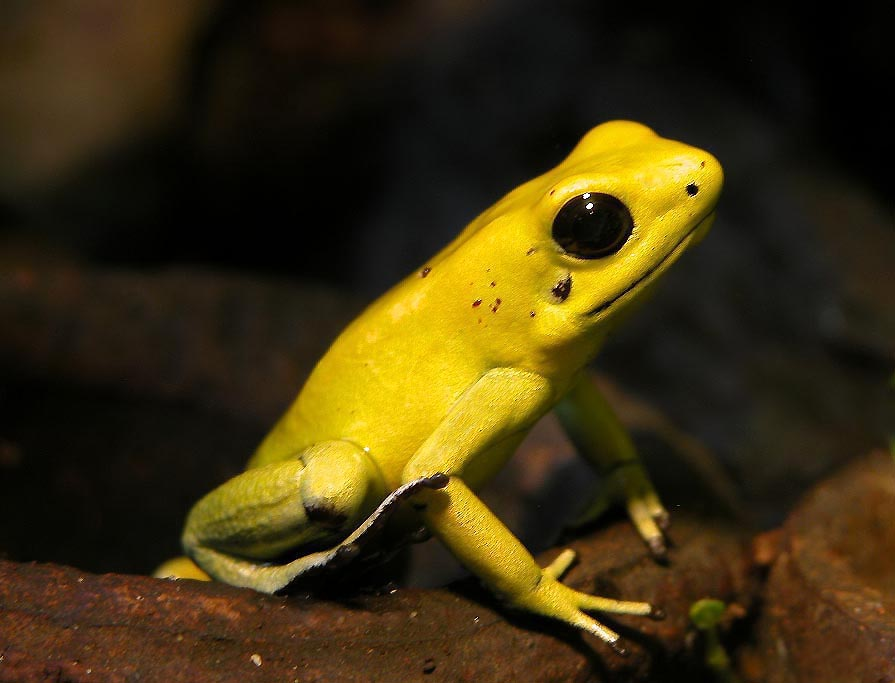
- P. terribilis

Scientific classification
- Kingdom: Animalia
- Phylum: Chordata
- Class: Amphibia
- Order: Anura
- Family: Dendrobatidae
- Subfamily: Dendrobatinae
- Genus: Phyllobates; Duméril and Bibron, 1841

Species
- 7, see text

= Phyllobates =

Genus of amphibians

Phyllobates is a genus of poison dart frogs native to Central and South America. The genus contains seven known species, which are distributed from eastern Nicaragua to the Pacific coast of Colombia.

Phyllobates contains the most poisonous species of frog, the golden poison frog (P. terribilis). They are typical of the poison dart frogs, in that all species have bright warning coloration (aposematism), and have varying degrees of toxicity. Only species of Phyllobates are used by natives of South American tribes as sources of poison for their hunting darts. The most toxic of the many poisonous alkaloids these frogs contain (in glands in their skin) is batrachotoxin, alongside a wide variety of other toxic compounds. Some populations of Phyllobates lugubris in Central America are not known to be toxic.

== Taxonomy ==
The genus name is derived from the Greek words φύλλον ("phyllon"; for "leaf") and βαίνω ("baino"; for "walk, step"). Phyllobates used to contain many of the species which are now within the genera Ranitomeya and Andinobates. However, it now just contains seven member species within the Phyllobates bicolor and Phyllobates lugubris species groups. These are:

Group	Image	Common name	Scientific name	Distribution
P. bicolor species group		Kokoe Poison Frog	Phyllobates aurotaenia (Boulenger, 1913)	Pacific coast of Colombia
P. bicolor species group			Phyllobates bezosi (Amézquita et al., 2024)	Pacific coast of Colombia
P. bicolor species group		Black-legged poison frog	Phyllobates bicolor (Duméril and Bibron, 1841)	Chocó area in western Colombia
P. bicolor species group			Phyllobates samperi Amézquita et al., 2024	Pacific coast of Colombia
P. bicolor species group		Golden poison frog	Phyllobates terribilis (Myers, Daly, and Malkin, 1978)	Pacific coast of Colombia.
P. lugubris species group		Lovely poison frog	Phyllobates lugubris (Schmidt, 1857)	southeastern Nicaragua through Costa Rica to northwestern Panama
P. lugubris species group		Golfodulcean poison frog	Phyllobates vittatus (Cope, 1893)	Costa Rica.

All these different species within the genus exhibit a diversity in color. Some examples are, P. terribilis, with color morphs of "mint", "yellow", and "orange". P. vittatus, another example, is always black as a ground color, but can show yellow stripes, orange stripes, red stripes,(stripes of all colors can be seen in two forms, narrow- and wide-banded) and turquoise, green, or blue legs, etc. The bicolor dart frog (Phyllobates bicolor) can range from yellow to orange, from black legs to green legs, to almost a uniform color of any of the aforementioned color morphs. P. aurotaenia specimens are yellow-banded or orange. They are always smaller than P. vittatus, and beyond locality, this is the best way to differentiate between the two in the field or in the hobby.

== Source of toxin ==
The toxic alkaloid batrachotoxin is only present in frogs found in the wild; after extended captivity, they lose their toxin, indicating that they acquire it (or metabolize it) from their natural diet; this alkaloid has been found in Papuan beetle species in the family Melyridae, and other related genera can be found in Colombia and other areas where Phyllobates are found.

== See also ==
- Allopumiliotoxin 267A
- Pumiliotoxin 251D
