= Hydric brooding =

Frog egg incubation practice

Hydric brooding is an egg incubation practice performed by some species of frogs. It involves either placing urine from the bladder on the eggs to keep them wet or holding the body over the eggs to prevent them from drying out.

Unlike reptile and bird eggs, which have an amniotic membrane to prevent dehydration, amphibian eggs laid on land can become dry and die. In some species, the male frog will periodically return to the clutch and moisten the eggs with urine from his bladder. For example, the male poison arrow frog Phyllobates vittatus sits on top of his eggs and sheds liquid. He visits the clutch roughly three times each day until hatching.
