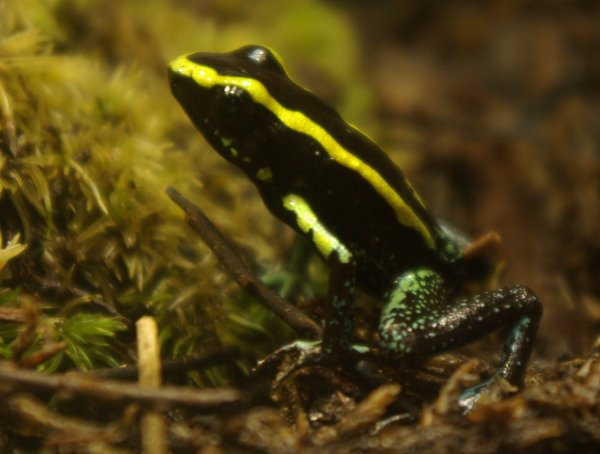

Conservation status
- Least Concern (IUCN 3.1)
- CITES Appendix II

Scientific classification
- Kingdom: Animalia
- Phylum: Chordata
- Class: Amphibia
- Order: Anura
- Family: Dendrobatidae
- Genus: Phyllobates
- Species: P. aurotaenia

Binomial name
- Phyllobates aurotaenia (Boulenger, 1913)

Synonyms
- Dendrobates aurotaenia Boulenger, 1913

= Phyllobates aurotaenia =

Species of amphibian

Phyllobates aurotaenia is a member of the frog family Dendrobatidae, which are found in the tropical environments of Central and South America. First described by zoologist George Albert Boulenger in 1913, P. aurotaenia is known for being the third most poisonous frog in the world. It is the smallest of the poison dart frogs in the Phyllobates genus and is endemic to the Pacific coast of Colombia.

Wild specimens store batrachotoxin in glands in their skin, which can be fatal to humans in doses as small as 100 μg. The unique lethality of their poison is a trait often exploited by certain Native American peoples of Colombia for hunting. The members of this species are characterized by: black dorsums, sometimes covered by orange suffusions; green, yellow, orange, or brownish gold dorsolateral stripes; and black abdomens with blue or green dots. The name Phyllobates aurotaenia is currently applied to two forms: a smaller, large-stripe form and a larger, small-stripe form. These forms are separated by a ravine yet retain the ability to interbreed. The number and range of P. aurotaenia is declining, primarily due to loss of habitat, and is currently classified as Least Concern by the IUCN.

== Range and habitat ==
P. aurotaenia is found in the wet forests of the Choco region of Colombia, west of the Andes, in the Atrato and San Juan drainages. It lives on the ground of humid lowland and submontane forests, typically between altitudes of 60 and 520 meters, and is found in primary and secondary forest but not in degraded areas.

As a vivarium subject, this frog is an active animal that will make use of vertical space. Kokoe dart frogs are highly social frogs that require high humidity, cool temperatures, and larger prey items than many dart frogs.

== Mating ==
P. aurotaenia usually performs mating calls while concealed beneath fallen leaves or logs, but occasionally while sitting on top of leaf litter. Their calls have been described as a loud, bird-like whirring twitter that consists of rapidly repeated notes, repeated at irregular intervals of several seconds and lasting up to 45 seconds.

These frogs do not engage in wrestling behavior among each other as do many other dart frogs. Males vying for a female will face off, calling loudly until one backs down. Unlike the other Phyllobates species, these frogs will not breed in coconut shells; they prefer to lay their eggs inside a narrow tube (small film canisters or nut pods) on the ground. Female P. aurotaenia lay their clutch of eggs, averaging 15-20, in leaf-litter and the male takes the tadpoles to slow-flowing water after the eggs hatch.

== Toxicity ==
P. aurotaenia is one of the most lethal species of the poison dart frogs, which is attributed to their storage and release of batrachotoxin from cutaneous granular glands scattered throughout the frogs' bodies. This extremely potent toxin is a steroidal alkaloid which, in mammals, acts by irreversibly binding to and permanently opening sodium ion channels within nerve and muscle cells. This prevents repolarization of the cell membrane and halts further signaling, resulting in paralysis and often death as any affected muscle becomes locked in the contracted state. In order to avoid self-intoxication the frogs have developed modified sodium channels to prevent the binding of batrachotoxin.

Although wild frogs are extremely deadly, frogs raised in captivity are generally non-toxic. It has therefore been proposed that the frogs do not synthesize batrachotoxin themselves, but it is instead obtained from their environment. Evidence suggests that the frogs accumulate this toxin through their diet of various beetles (ex: melyrid beetles), millipedes, and flies as well as the unique composition of leaf litter on the forest floor.

== Value ==
P. aurotaenia is one of three species known to be used for poisoning darts; the others being P. terribilis and P. bicolor. The Chocó Native Americans of the upper San Juan drainage region of Colombia attract and capture these species by imitating their calls. Because they release their poison only under stress, the poison is extracted by piercing the frogs through the mouth with a wooden skewer and holding them over a fire. The Chocóan people then coat their darts by rubbing the darts across the backs of the frogs.
