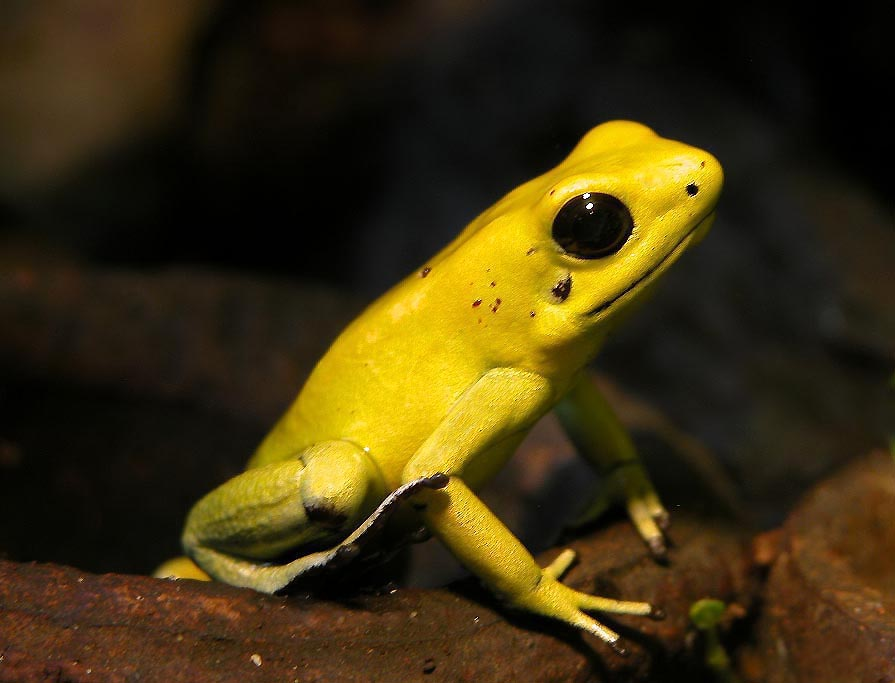

Conservation status
- Endangered (IUCN 3.1)
- CITES Appendix II

Scientific classification
- Kingdom: Animalia
- Phylum: Chordata
- Class: Amphibia
- Order: Anura
- Family: Dendrobatidae
- Genus: Phyllobates
- Species: P. terribilis

Binomial name
- Phyllobates terribilis Myers, Daly, and Malkin, 1978

= Golden poison frog =

Species of amphibian

The golden poison frog (Phyllobates terribilis), also known as the golden dart frog or golden poison arrow frog, is a poison dart frog endemic to the rainforests of Colombia. The golden poison frog has become endangered due to habitat destruction within its naturally limited range. Despite its small size, this frog is considered to be the most poisonous extant animal species on the planet.

== Taxonomy and etymology ==
The golden poison frog was described as Phyllobates terribilis in 1978 by herpetologists Charles W. Myers and Borys Malkin as well as biochemist John W. Daly; the species name terribilis is a reference to the deadly toxins present in the skin secretions of this species. Myers' research was based on hundreds of specimens collected on an expedition to the Quebrada Guangui and La Brea regions of the Colombian rainforest, and a breeding colony of 18 frogs established at the American Museum of Natural History.

== Distribution and habitat ==
The golden poison frog is endemic to humid forests of the Pacific coast of Colombia in the Cauca and Valle del Cauca Departments in the Chocó Rainforest. The optimal habitat of this species is the rainforest with high rain rates (5 m or more per year), altitudes from sea level to 200 m elevation, temperatures of at least 26 °C, and relative humidity of 80–90%. It is known only from primary transport the tadpoles to permanent pools. Its range is less than 5,000 square km; destruction of this habitat has contributed to P. terribilis becoming an endangered species.

== Description ==
The golden poison frog is the largest species of the poison dart frog family, and can reach a weight of nearly 30 grams with a length of 6 cm as adults. Females are typically larger than males. The adults are brightly colored, while juvenile frogs have mostly black bodies with two golden-yellow stripes along their backs. The black fades as they mature, and at around 18 weeks of age the frog is fully colored. The frog's color pattern is aposematic (a coloration to warn predators of its toxicity). Despite their common name, golden poison frogs occur in four main color varieties or morphs:

=== Yellow ===
The yellow morph is the reason Phyllobates terribilis has the common name golden poison frog. These frogs can be pale yellow to deep, golden yellow in color. Yellow Phyllobates terribilis specimens are found in Quebrada Guangui, Colombia.

=== Mint green ===
The largest morph of Phyllobates terribilis exists in the La Brea and La Sirpa areas in Colombia; despite the name "mint green" these frogs can be metallic green, pale green, or white.

=== Orange ===
Orange examples of Phyllobates terribilis exist in Colombia, as well. They tend to be a metallic orange or yellow-orange in color, with varying intensity. They have been observed living near yellow specimens in Quebrada Guangui, Colombia, and it is unclear to what extent these represent an individual subpopulation or locality distinct from the yellow morph.

=== Orange blackfoot ===
The orange blackfoot morph is a captive-bred line established by Tesoros de Colombia, a Colombian company that aims to reduce poaching of wild dart frogs by breeding rare species and flooding the pet trade with low-cost animals to decrease the value of wild specimens to poachers. This morph is golden yellow to a deep orange. They have dark markings on their feet, throat, vent, and rump that range from distinct black to nearly absent or speckled grey.

Phyllobates terribilis color morphs

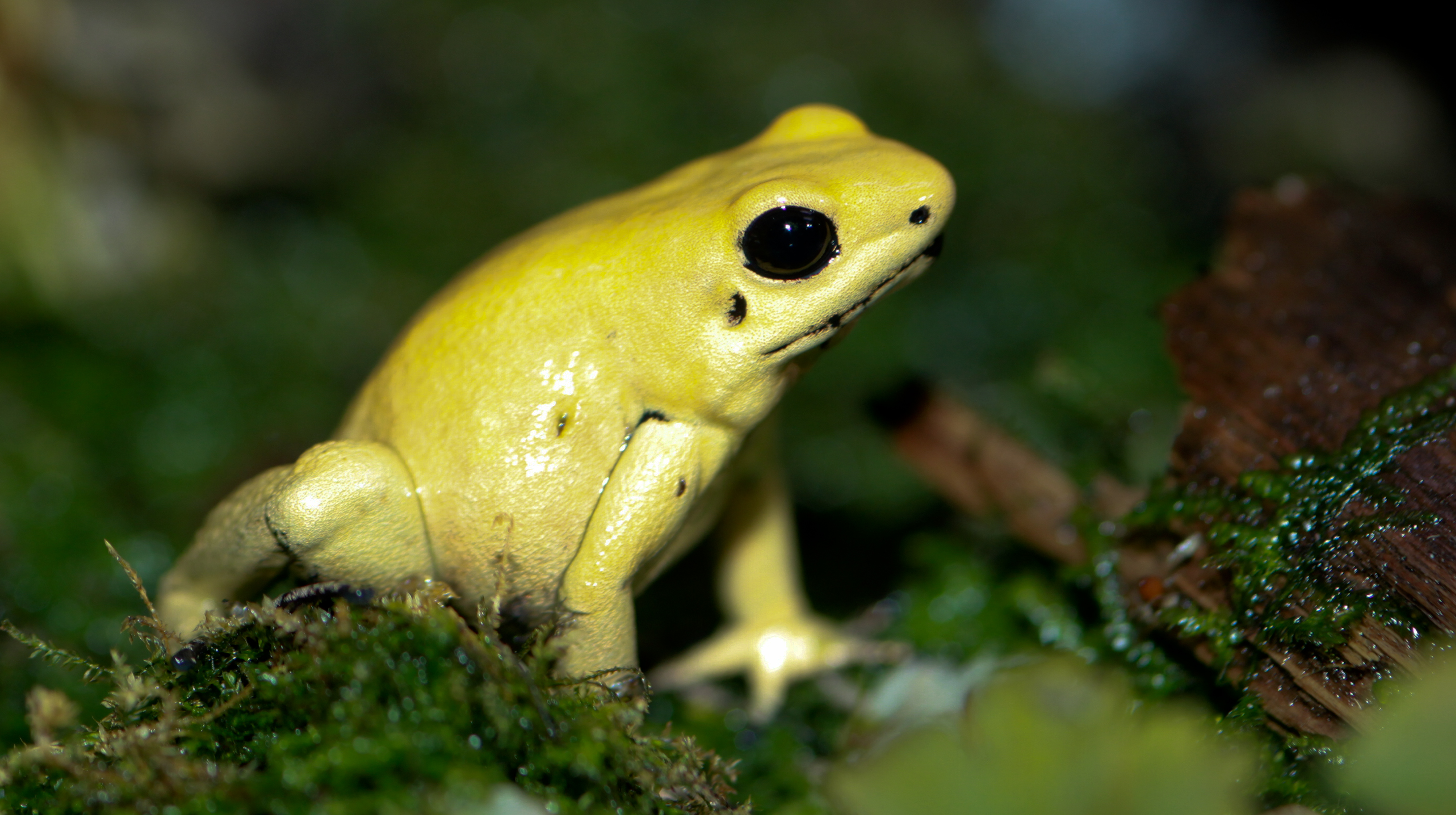
Yellow

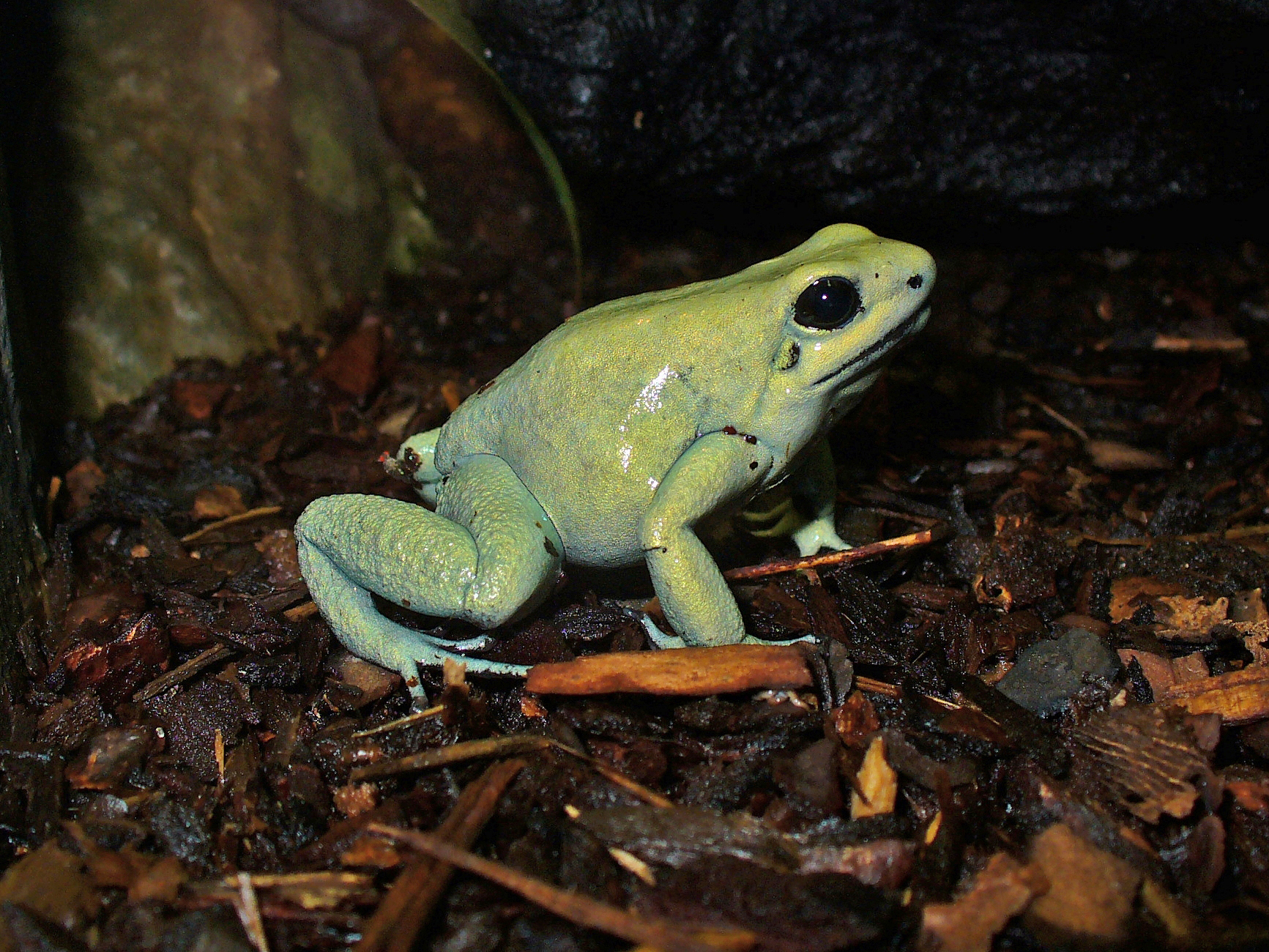

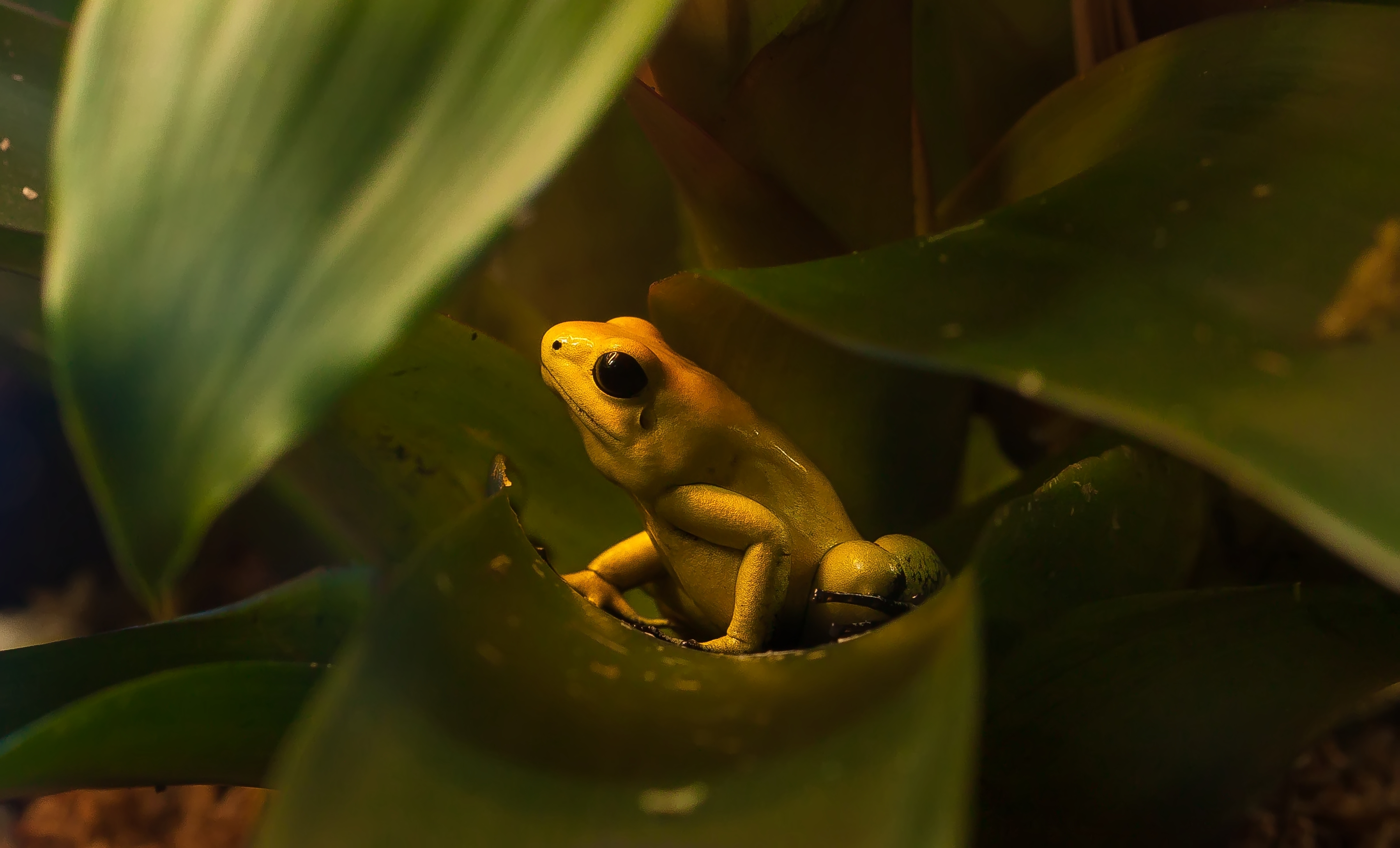
Orange

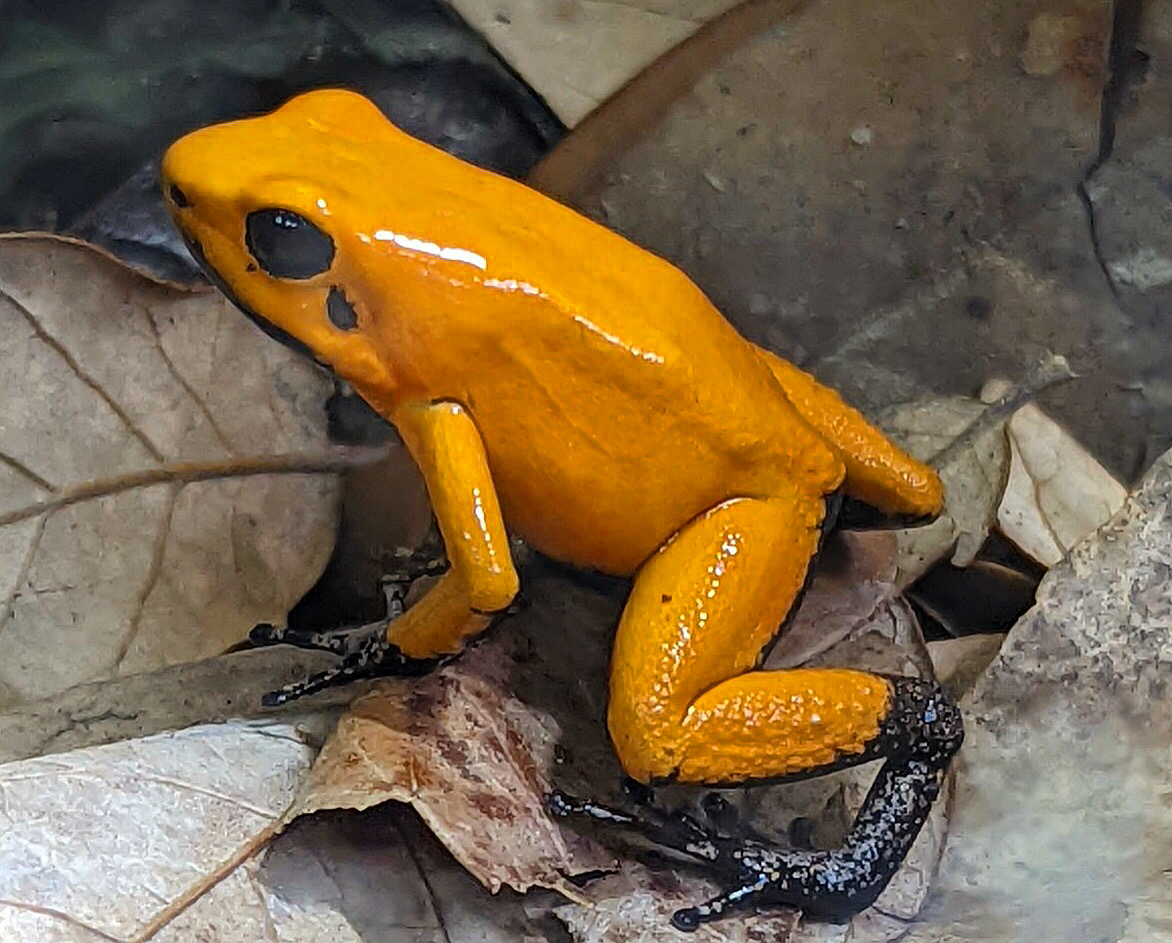
Orange blackfoot

== Ecology and behavior ==
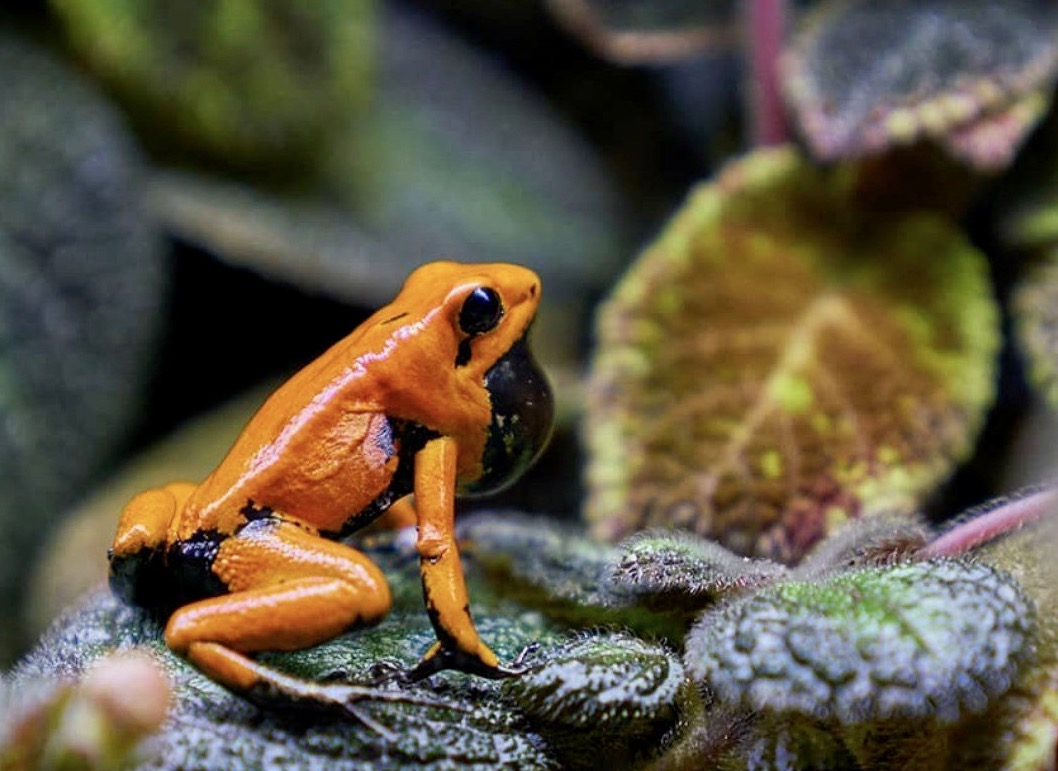
Male Phyllobates terribilis 'orange blackfoot' calling

The frog is normally diurnal; golden poison frogs live evenly spaced without forming larger congregations.

=== Diet ===
This species is an unspecialized ambush hunter; an adult frog can eat food items much larger in relation to its size than most other dendrobatids. The main natural sources of food of P. terribilis are the ants in the genera Brachymyrmex and Paratrechina, but many kinds of insects and other small invertebrates are eaten. Tadpoles feed on algae, mosquito larvae, and other edible material that may be present in their environment.

=== Breeding ===
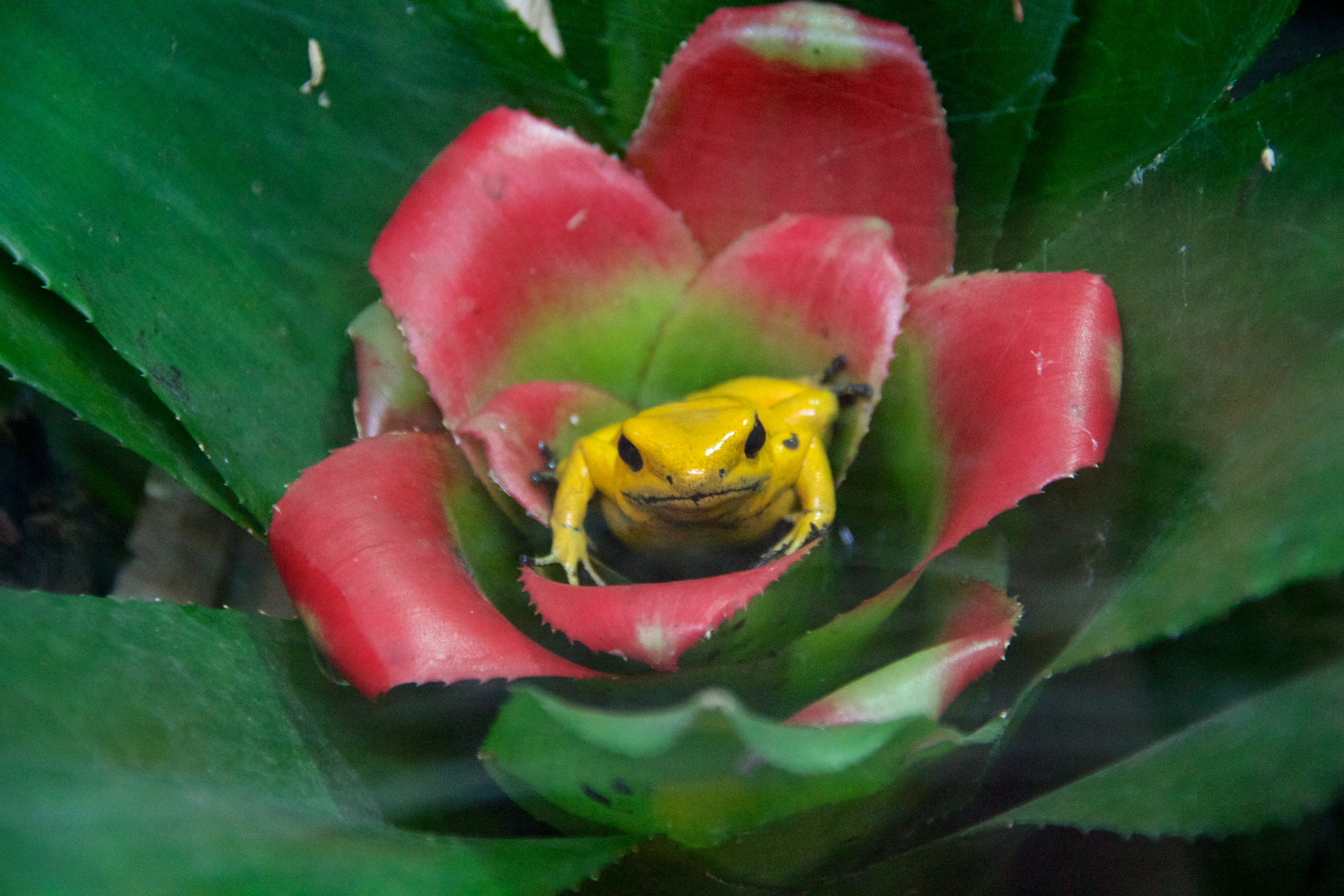
Phyllobates terribilis in a bromeliad

Males advertise to receptive females with a trilling call. Golden poison frogs are notable for demonstrating tactile courtship during reproduction, each partner stroking its mate's head, back, flanks, and cloacal areas prior to egg deposition. The eggs are fertilized externally. The golden poison frogs lay their eggs on the ground, hidden beneath leaf litter. Once the tadpoles emerge from their eggs, they stick themselves to the mucus on the backs of their parents. The adult frogs carry their young into the canopy, depositing them in the pools of water that accumulate in the centre of bromeliads and water-filled tree holes. The tadpoles feed on algae and mosquito larvae in their nursery.

=== Predators ===
Golden poison frogs are so toxic that adult frogs likely have few – if any – predators. The snake species Leimadophis epinephelus has shown resistance to several frog toxins including batrachotoxin, and has been observed to eat juvenile frogs without ill effects.

== Toxicity ==
The golden poison frog is one of the most poisonous animals on the planet; these frogs produce deadly alkaloid batrachotoxins in their skin glands as a defense against predators. To become poisoned, a predator generally must attempt to consume the frog, although contact with the skin is also dangerous. This extraordinarily lethal poison is very rare. Batrachotoxin is found only in three poisonous frogs from Colombia (all genus Phyllobates), a few birds from Papua New Guinea, and four Papuan beetles of the genus Choresine in the family Melyridae. Batrachotoxin affects the sodium channels of nerve cells. While it is unknown how the frog avoids poisoning itself, other species of poisonous frogs have been demonstrated to express a "toxin sponge" protein in blood plasma, internal organs, and muscle that binds and sequesters the toxin so as to prevent autointoxication.

=== Mechanism ===
Chemical structure of batrachotoxin, the toxic steroidal alkaloid from the skin of Phyllobates

Batrachotoxin irreversibly opens the sodium channels of nerve cells, leaving the muscles in an inactive state of contraction. This can lead to paralysis, heart fibrillation, heart failure, and death. The average dose carried will vary between locations, and consequent local diet, but the average wild golden poison frog is generally estimated to contain about one milligram of poison, enough to kill between 10 and 20 humans, or up to two African bull elephants. Smaller doses have been shown to cause seizures, salivation, muscle contractions, dyspnoea and death in mice: the subcutaneous LD50 is just 0.2 μg/kg, although low doses such as 0.01 μg/kg and 0.02 μg/kg may be lethal. Myers et al. estimate that the lethal dose for humans is between 2.0 and 7.5 μg.

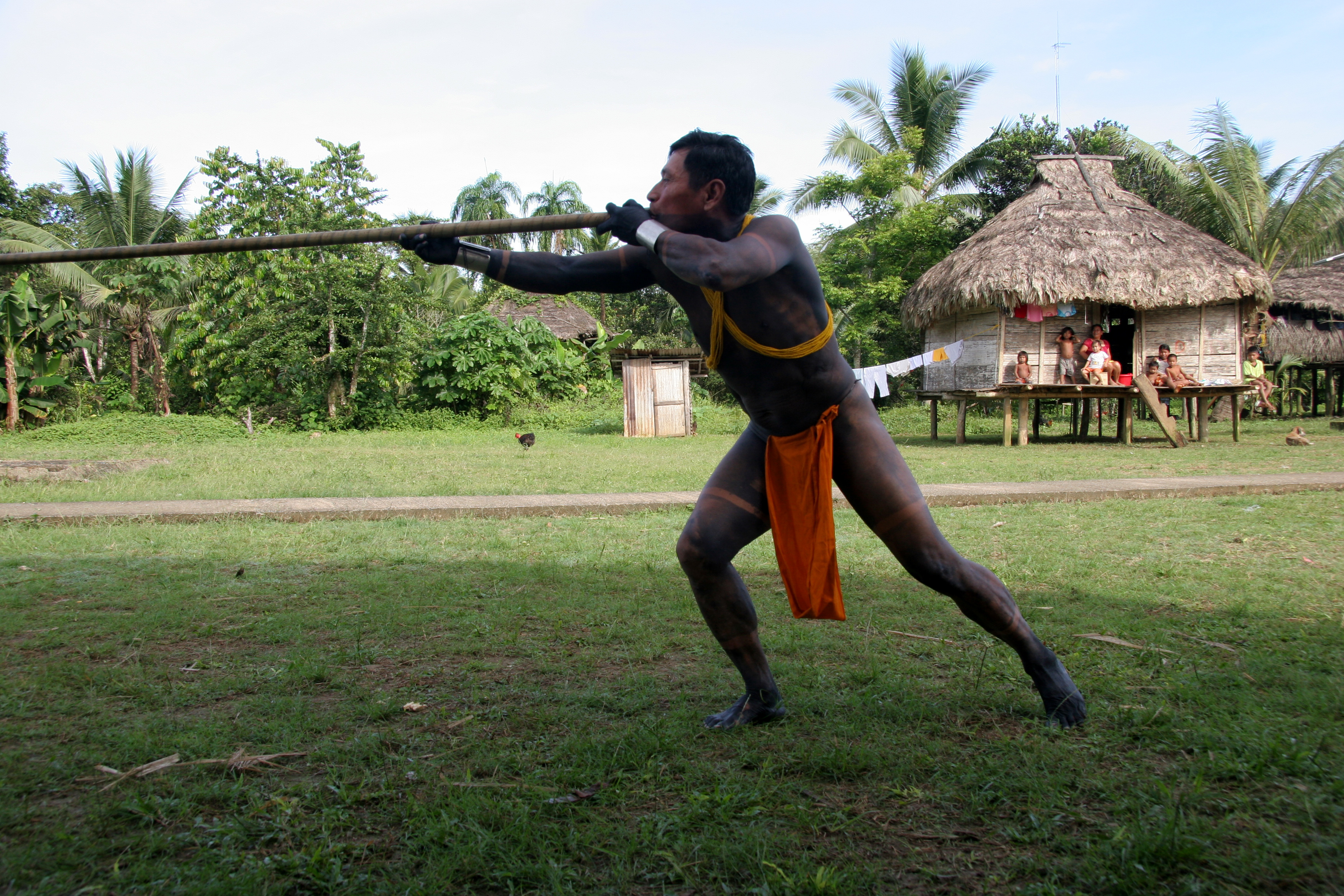
Phyllobates species are used by native Colombians to poison their blowgun darts

=== Synthesis ===
Golden poison frogs appear to rely on the consumption of small insects or other arthropods to synthesize batrachotoxin; frogs kept in captivity fed on commercially available feeder insects will eventually lose their toxicity, and frogs bred in captivity are considered non-toxic. It is not clear which prey species supplies the potent alkaloid that gives golden poison frogs their exceptionally high levels of toxicity, or whether the frogs modify another available toxin to produce a more efficient variant, as do some of the frogs from the genus Dendrobates. Scientists have suggested the crucial prey item may be a small beetle from the family Melyridae. At least one species of these beetles produces the same toxin found in golden poison frogs. Their relatives in Colombian rainforests could be the source of the batrachotoxins found in the highly toxic Phyllobates frogs of that region.

=== Use by indigenous people ===
Golden poison frogs are a very important frog to the local indigenous cultures, such as the Emberá and Cofán people in Colombia's rainforest. The frog is the main source of the poison in the darts used by the natives to hunt their food. The Emberá people carefully expose the frog to the heat of a fire, and the frog exudes small amounts of poisonous fluid. The tips of arrows and darts are soaked in the fluid, and remain deadly for two years or longer.

== In captivity ==
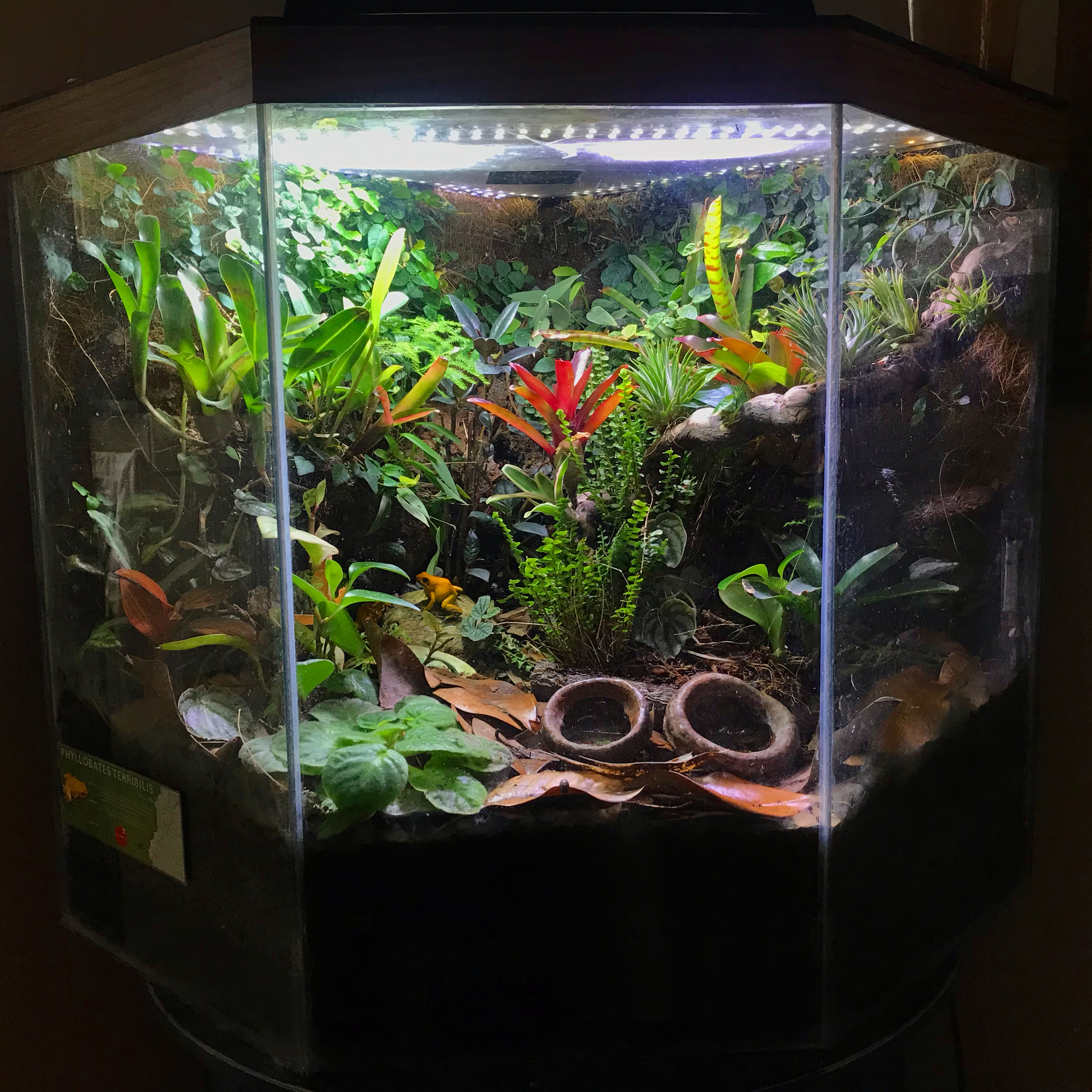
Phyllobates terribilis in captivity

The golden poison frog is a popular vivarium subject due to its bright color and bold personality in captivity. Despite its dangerous toxicity in the wild, captive specimens raised without their natural food sources are non-toxic in captivity.

Due to their small range in the wild, poaching for the pet trade formerly represented a serious threat to the survival of the species. Due to efforts of frog breeders like Tesoros de Colombia, captive bred frogs are now widely available for the pet trade. As these specimens are legal, non-toxic, healthier, and less expensive when compared to poached animals, the demand for illegally obtained wild caught specimens has decreased. Today, the IUCN estimates that the majority of golden poison frogs sold for the pet trade are legally produced from captive lines, and estimates the threat from collection for the pet trade to be small.
