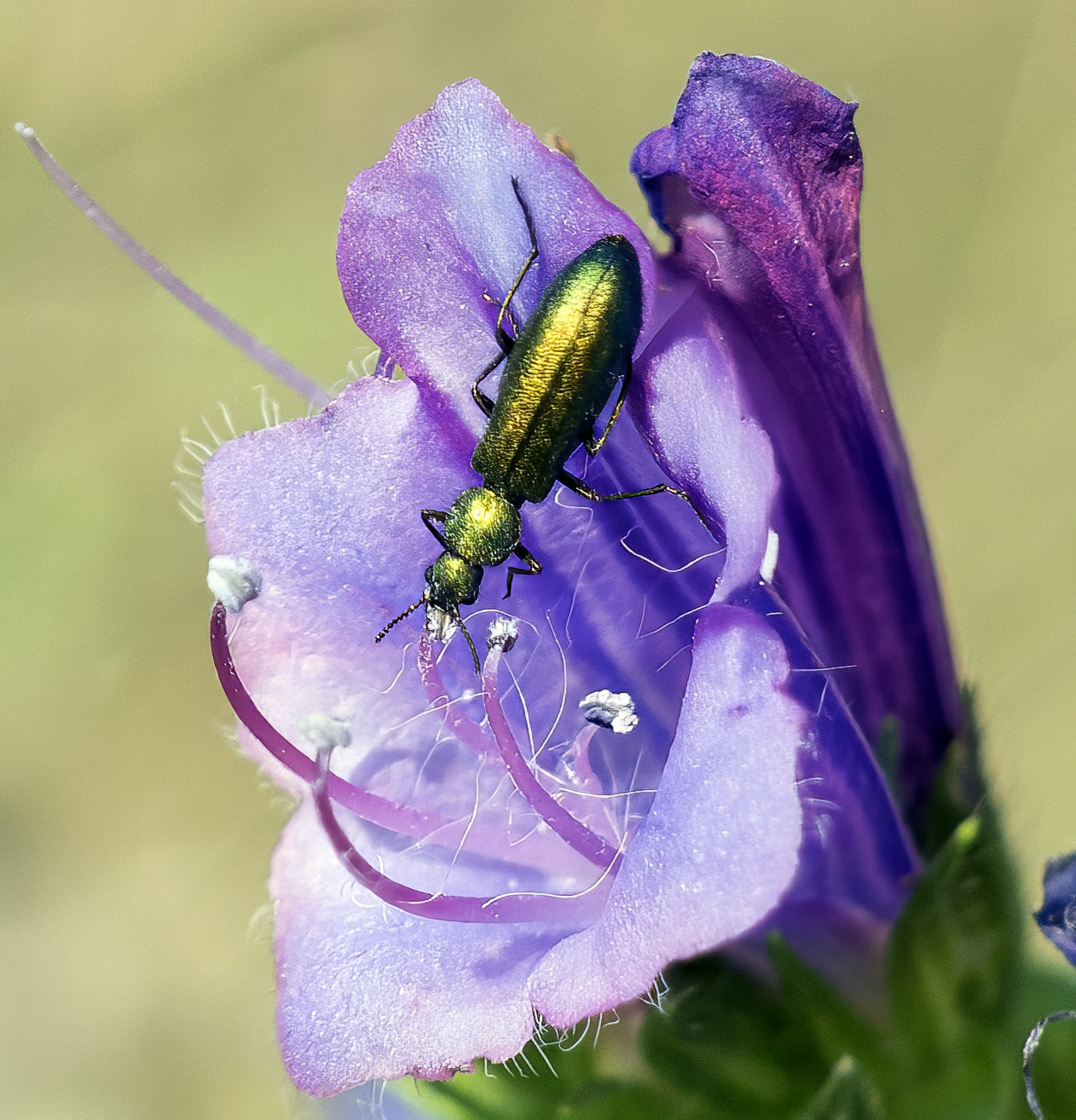
- Psilothrix viridicoerulea on Echium plantagineum

Scientific classification
- Kingdom: Animalia
- Phylum: Arthropoda
- Clade: Pancrustacea
- Class: Insecta
- Order: Coleoptera
- Suborder: Polyphaga
- Infraorder: Cucujiformia
- Family: Melyridae
- Genus: Psilothrix
- Species: P. viridicoerulea

Binomial name
- Psilothrix viridicoerulea (Geoffroy, 1785)

Synonyms
- Melyris cyanea Olivier, 1790; Cicindela viridicoerulea Geoffroy, 1785; Lagria caerulea Fabricius, 1792; Lagria viridis Rossi, 1792; Melyris nobilis Illiger, 1798; Tillus aenea Marsham, 1802

= Psilothrix viridicoerulea =

Species of beetle

Psilothrix viridicoerulea is a species of soft-winged flower beetle belonging to the family Melyridae, subfamily Dasytinae.

== Distribution ==
This beetle is mainly present in most of Europe (Belgium, Netherlands, Denmark, Italy, Spain, Portugal, Greece, Croatia, France, Germany, Ireland, Latvia, Malta, North Macedonia, Slovenia, Sweden and Switzerland) and in the Near East. There are also additional localized populations in England, mostly on the southern coastline.

== Habitat ==
They are quite common in summer on meadows, pastures, and grasslands, to be seen on a variety of flowers.

== Description ==
The adults grow up to 4.8–6.6 millimetres (0.19–0.26 in) long. The colour of this beautiful insect is brilliant metallic bluish-green. Body is rather long and narrow. Head is slightly longer than wide, with a flat face, large, round eyes and short, green-metallic, hairy antennae, composed by eleven short inwards protruding articles. Pronotum and elytra are thickly, deeply and strongly punctuated and covered of black erect hairs. Elitra are very elongated, square at the base. Legs are long and slender, greenish and hairy. Pygidium (last male tergite) shows a deep but small V-shaped notch. This species is rather similar to Psilothrix aureola.

== Biology ==
The larvae initially feed on dead insects, then become phytophagous. They bore longitudinal galleries in the stems of some annual weeds (Ferula, Magydaris, Carlina, Cirsium, etc.). Metamorphosis takes place in late winter within. The adults leave the pupal chamber in following spring. This species is often associated with graminaceous grasses.

== Gallery ==
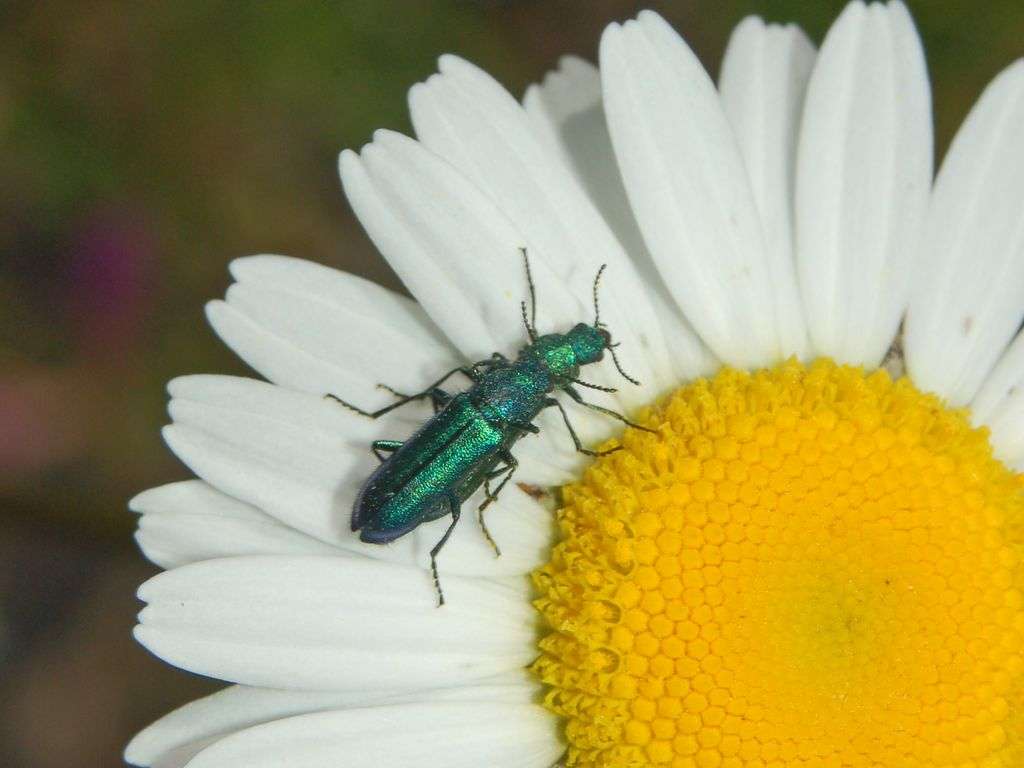
Mating couple

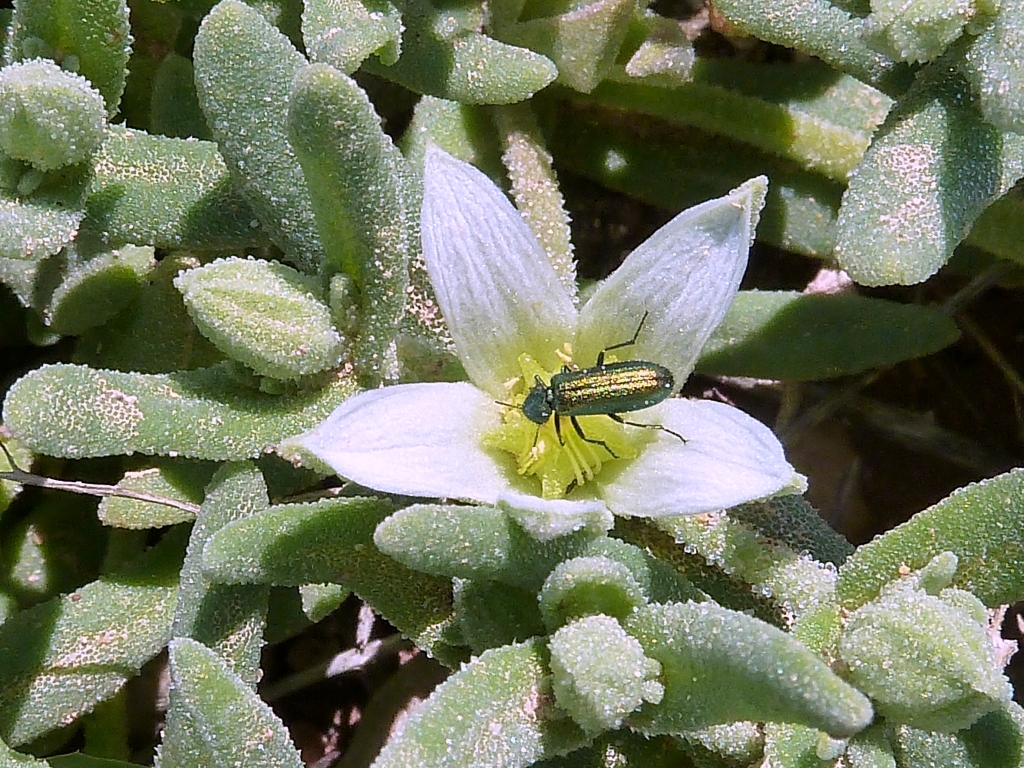
Feeding on pollen of Aizoanthemum hispanicum

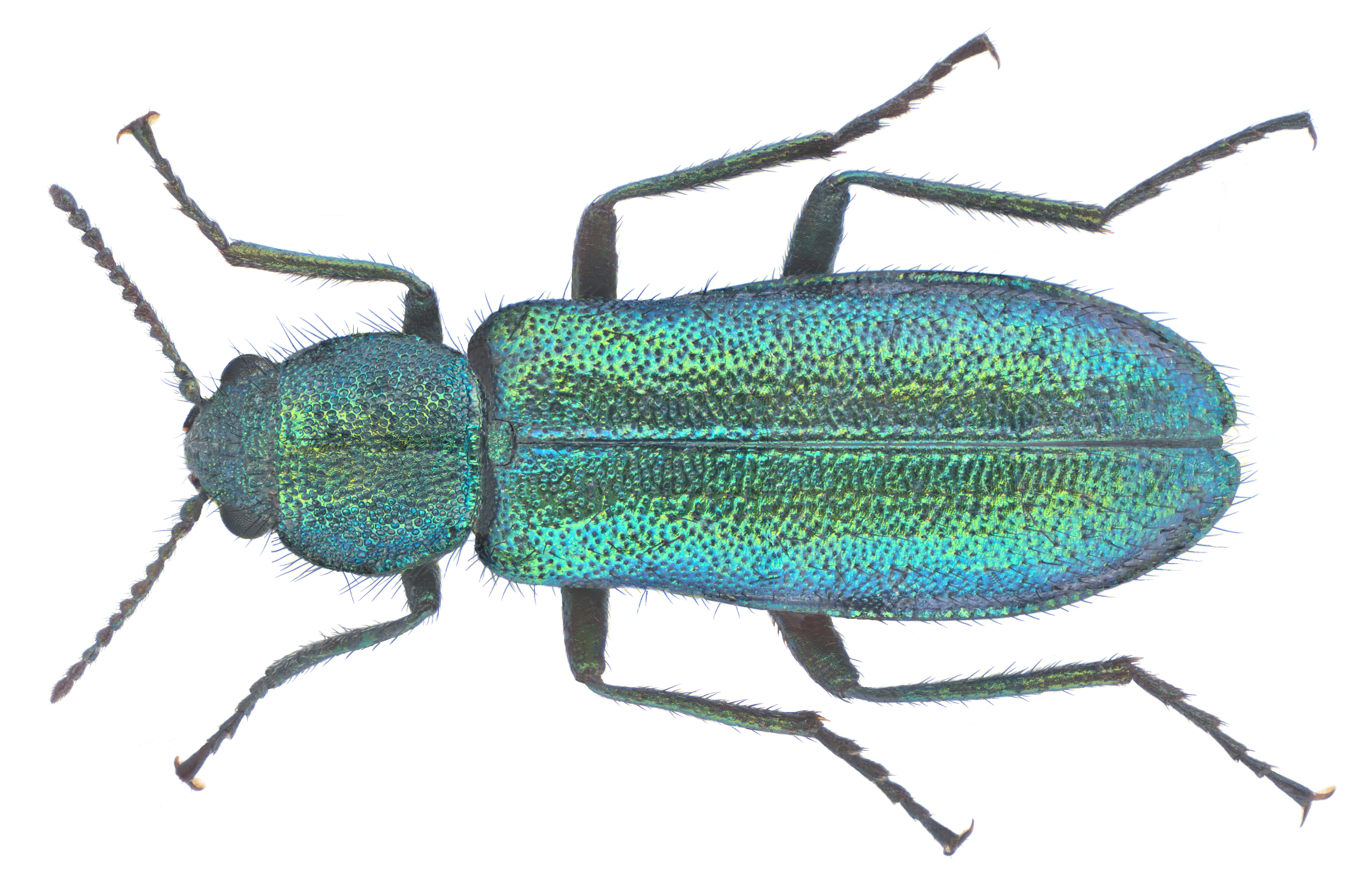
Mounted specimen

== Bibliography ==
- La faune de la France illustrée - Rémy Perrier - Tome VI Coléoptères 2nd part
