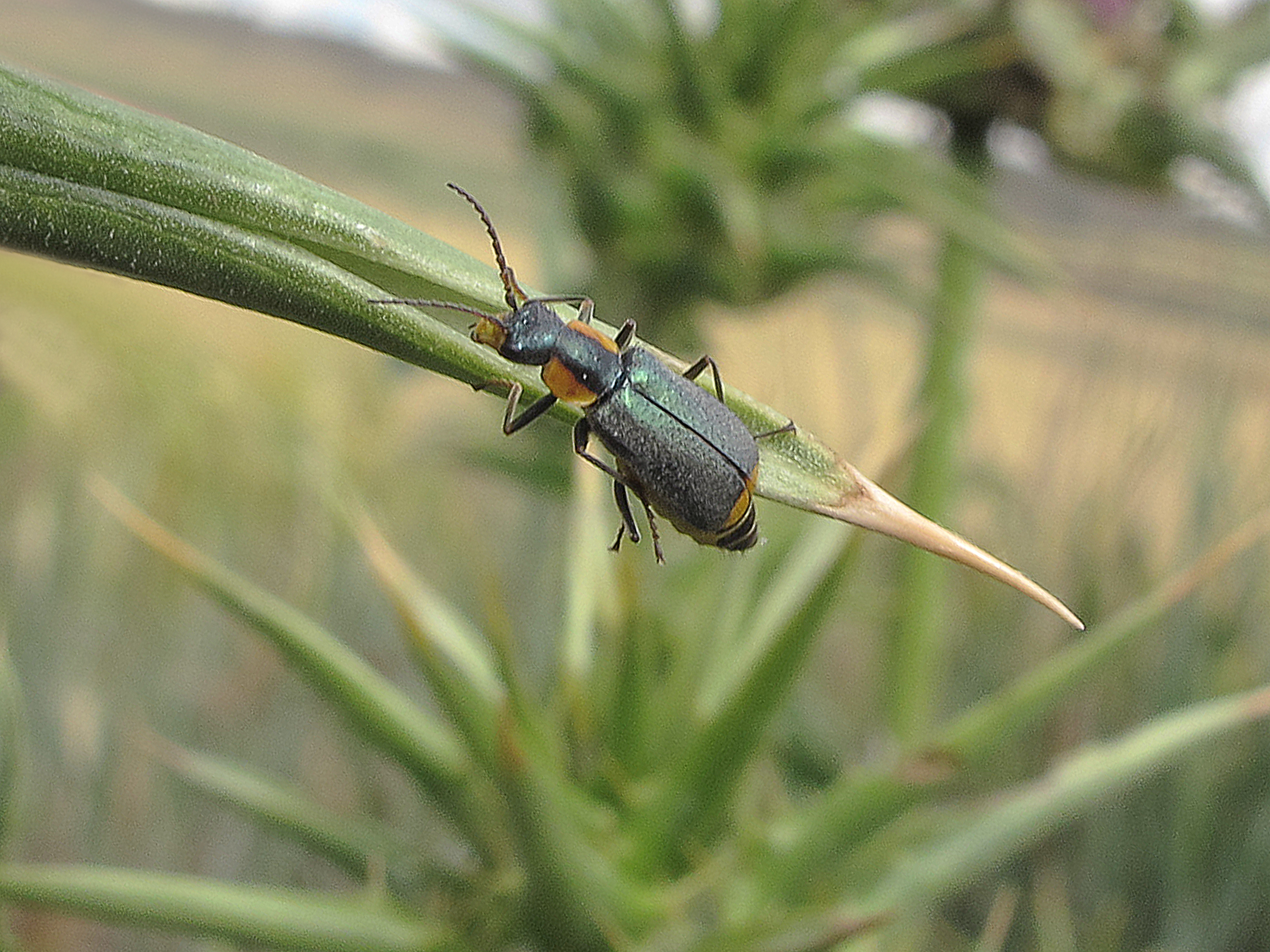

Scientific classification
- Kingdom: Animalia
- Phylum: Arthropoda
- Clade: Pancrustacea
- Class: Insecta
- Order: Coleoptera
- Suborder: Polyphaga
- Infraorder: Cucujiformia
- Family: Melyridae
- Genus: Clanoptilus
- Species: C. marginellus

Binomial name
- Clanoptilus marginellus (Olivier, 1790)

Synonyms
- Malachius marginellus Olivier, 1819

= Clanoptilus marginellus =

Species of beetle

Clanoptilus marginellus is a species of beetle belonging to the family Melyridae.

== Distribution ==
This species is present in most of Europe.

The body is 5–6.5 millimeters long and solid metallic green or blue. The head and pronotum have fairly long upright hairs. It is quite similar to Cordylepherus viridis, but differs from it in that the pronotum has a reddish edge on each side. The antennae are attached just in front of the compound eyes and have eleven segments. The elytra have dark upright hairs along with finer lying hairs. The elytra end at the sides and lack an inwardly curved extension slightly under the abdomen. The legs are fairly slender, and all tarsi have five segments.
