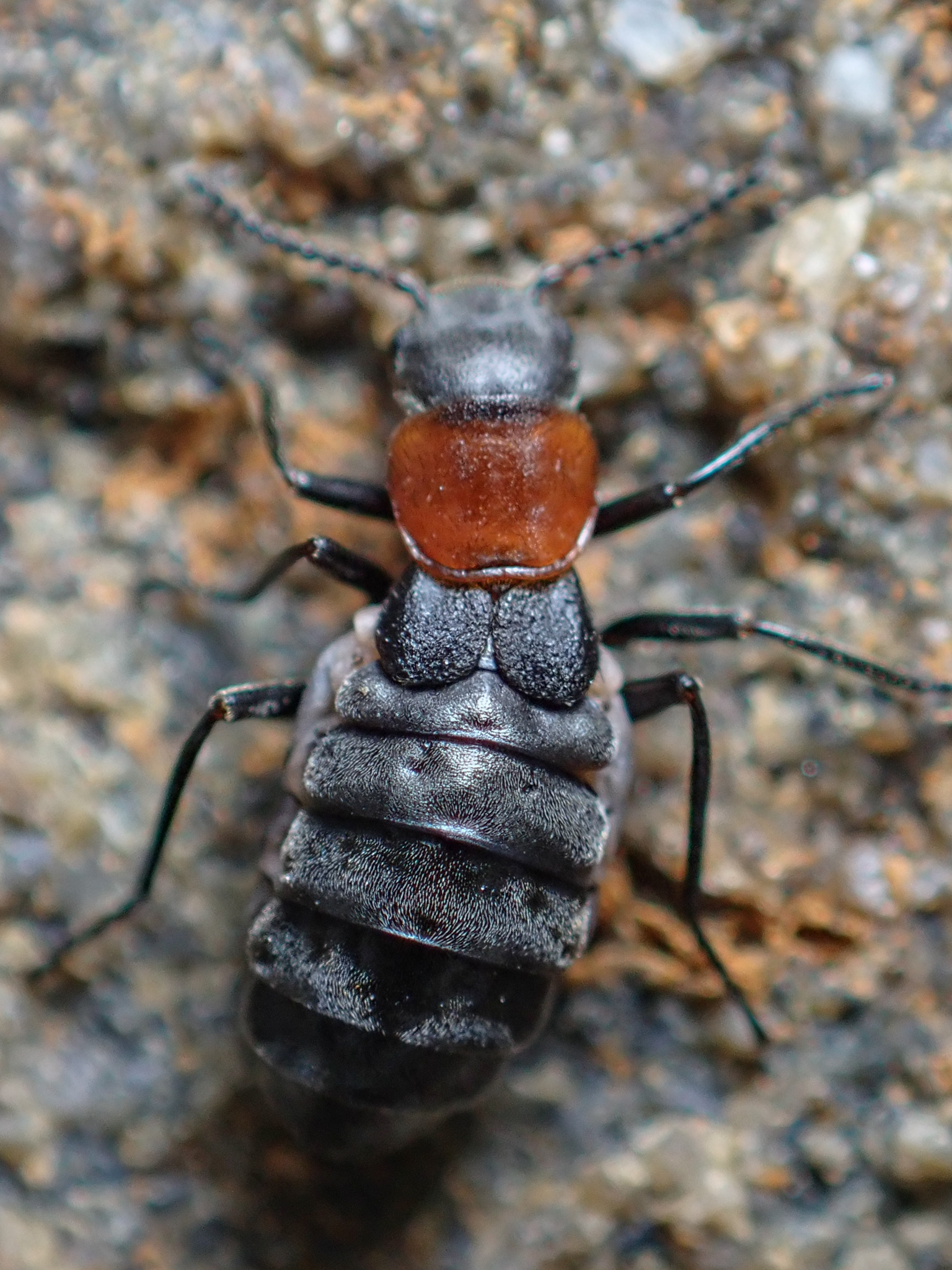

Scientific classification
- Kingdom: Animalia
- Phylum: Arthropoda
- Clade: Pancrustacea
- Class: Insecta
- Order: Coleoptera
- Suborder: Polyphaga
- Infraorder: Cucujiformia
- Family: Melyridae
- Genus: Endeodes
- Species: E. collaris

Binomial name
- Endeodes collaris LeConte, 1853

= Endeodes collaris =

Species of beetle

Endeodes collaris is a species of soft-winged flower beetle in the family Melyridae. It is found in North America.
