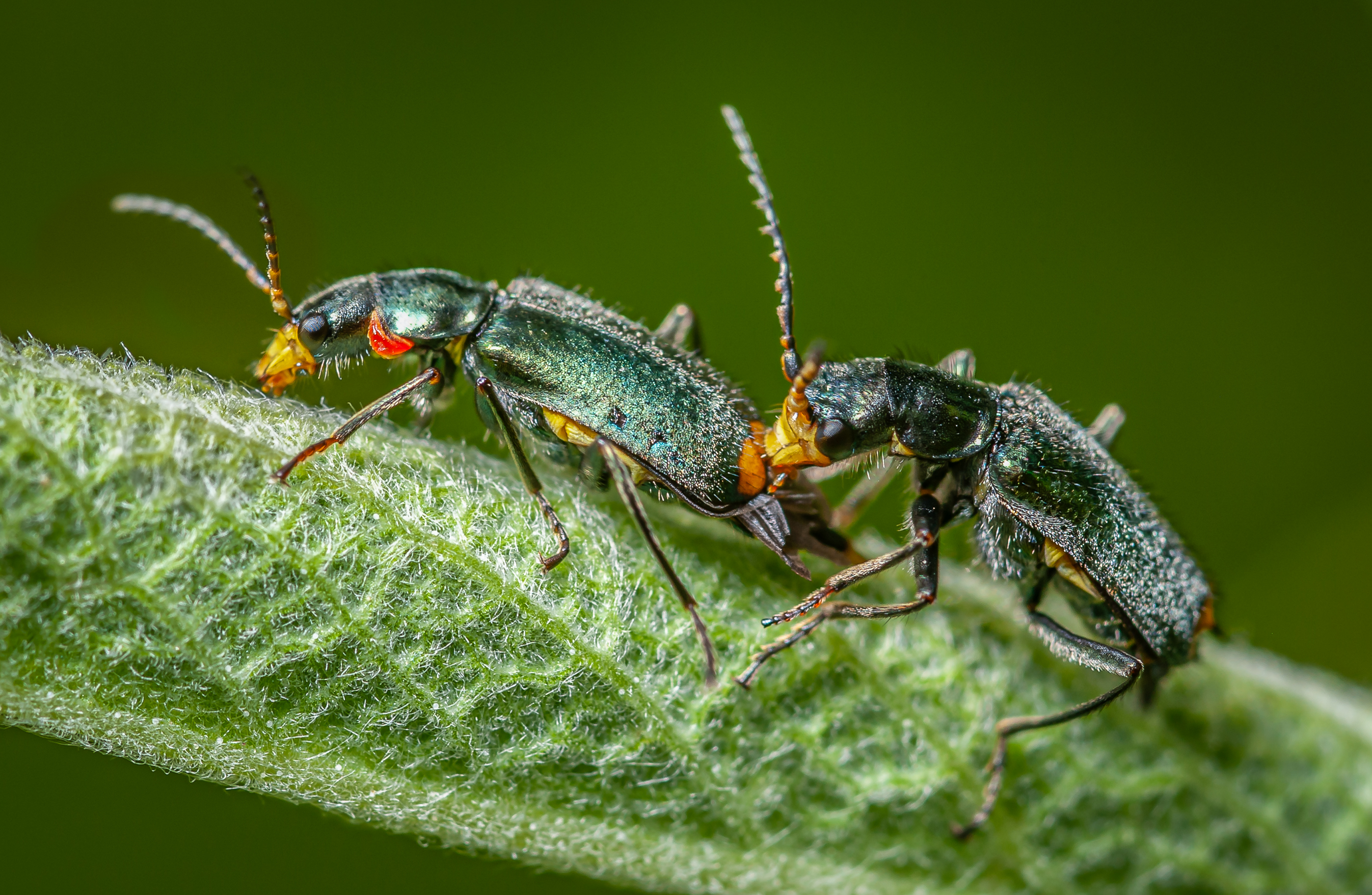

Scientific classification
- Kingdom: Animalia
- Phylum: Arthropoda
- Clade: Pancrustacea
- Class: Insecta
- Order: Coleoptera
- Suborder: Polyphaga
- Infraorder: Cucujiformia
- Family: Melyridae
- Genus: Clanoptilus
- Species: C. elegans

Binomial name
- Clanoptilus elegans (Olivier, 1790)

Synonyms
- Clanoptilus (Clanoptilus) elegans (Olivier 1790); Malachius elegans Olivier, 1790

= Clanoptilus elegans =

Species of beetle

Clanoptilus elegans is a species of beetle belonging to the family Melyridae, the soft-winged flower beetles. It is found in Europe.
