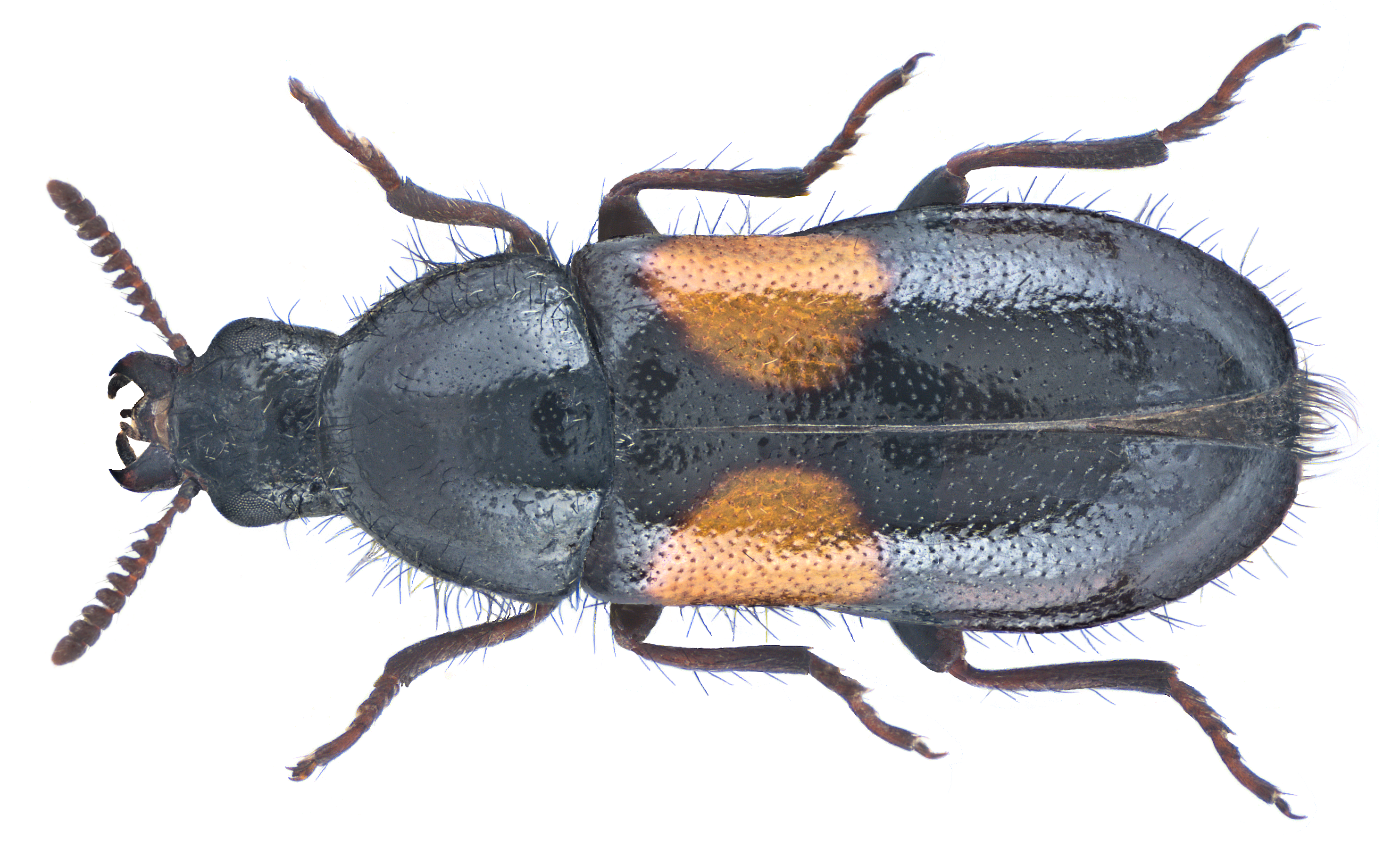
- Divales bipustulatus

Scientific classification
- Kingdom: Animalia
- Phylum: Arthropoda
- Class: Insecta
- Order: Coleoptera
- Suborder: Polyphaga
- Infraorder: Cucujiformia
- Family: Melyridae
- Genus: Divales
- Species: D. bipustulatus

Binomial name
- Divales bipustulatus (Fabricius, 1781)

Synonyms
- Hispa bipustulata Fabricius, 1781

= Divales bipustulatus =

Species of beetle

Divales bipustulatus is a species of beetles belonging to the family Melyridae.

== Description ==
Divales bipustulatus can reach a length of 5–5.5 millimetres (0.20–0.22 in). Elytra show two humeral red patches. Body is glossy, deep black, covered with fine erect hairs. Antennae and legs are black.

== Distribution ==
This species is present in France, Italy, Switzerland, Greece and North Africa.

== Subspecies ==
- Divales bipustulatus bimaculatus (Rossi, 1792)
- Divales bipustulatus bipustulatus (Fabricius, 1781)
- Divales bipustulatus erithromelas (Küster, 1852)
- Divales bipustulatus nigromaculatus (Lucas, 1849)
- Divales bipustulatus quadrimaculatus (Baudi, 1873)
- Divales bipustulatus variegatus (Lucas, 1849)
