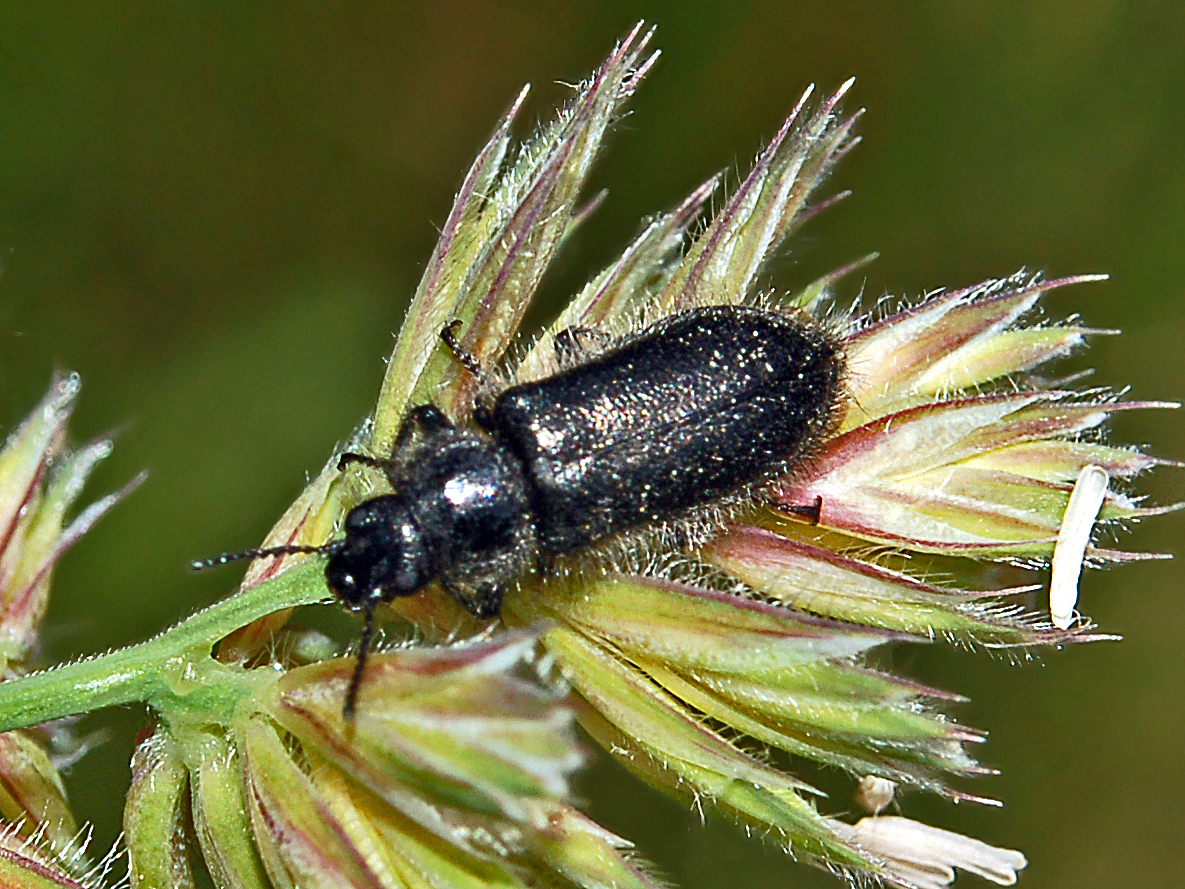
- Female
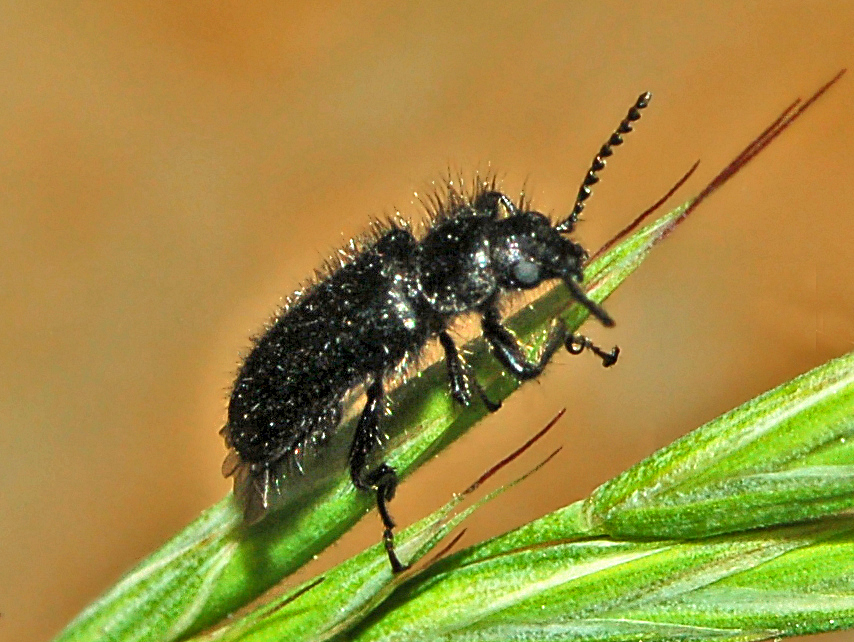
- Male

Scientific classification
- Domain: Eukaryota
- Kingdom: Animalia
- Phylum: Arthropoda
- Class: Insecta
- Order: Coleoptera
- Suborder: Polyphaga
- Infraorder: Cucujiformia
- Family: Melyridae
- Genus: Enicopus
- Species: E. pilosus

Binomial name
- Enicopus pilosus (Scopoli, 1763)

Synonyms
- Cantharis pilosus Scopoli, 1763; Henicopus acutatus Boieldieu, 1859; Enicopus falculifer Fairmaire, 1859; Enicopus subvittatus Fairmaire, 1859

= Enicopus pilosus =

Species of beetle

Enicopus pilosus is a species of soft-winged flower beetles belonging to the family Melyridae, subfamily Dasytinae.

== Description ==
Enicopus pilosus can reach a length of 10–11 millimetres (0.39–0.43 in) in males, 7–8 millimetres (0.28–0.31 in) in females. The body is completely black, with long hair, especially in females. Hair are black in males, grayish in females. The males have a pointed appendage on the first article of the anterior tarsi and a flattened hook on the posterior tarsi.

== Habitat ==
These beetles prefer open areas, forest edges, roads, fields, meadows and pastures. They are quite common in summer on the stems of Poaceae species.

== Distribution ==
This species is mainly present in Croatia, France, Italy, Slovenia, Spain and Switzerland.
