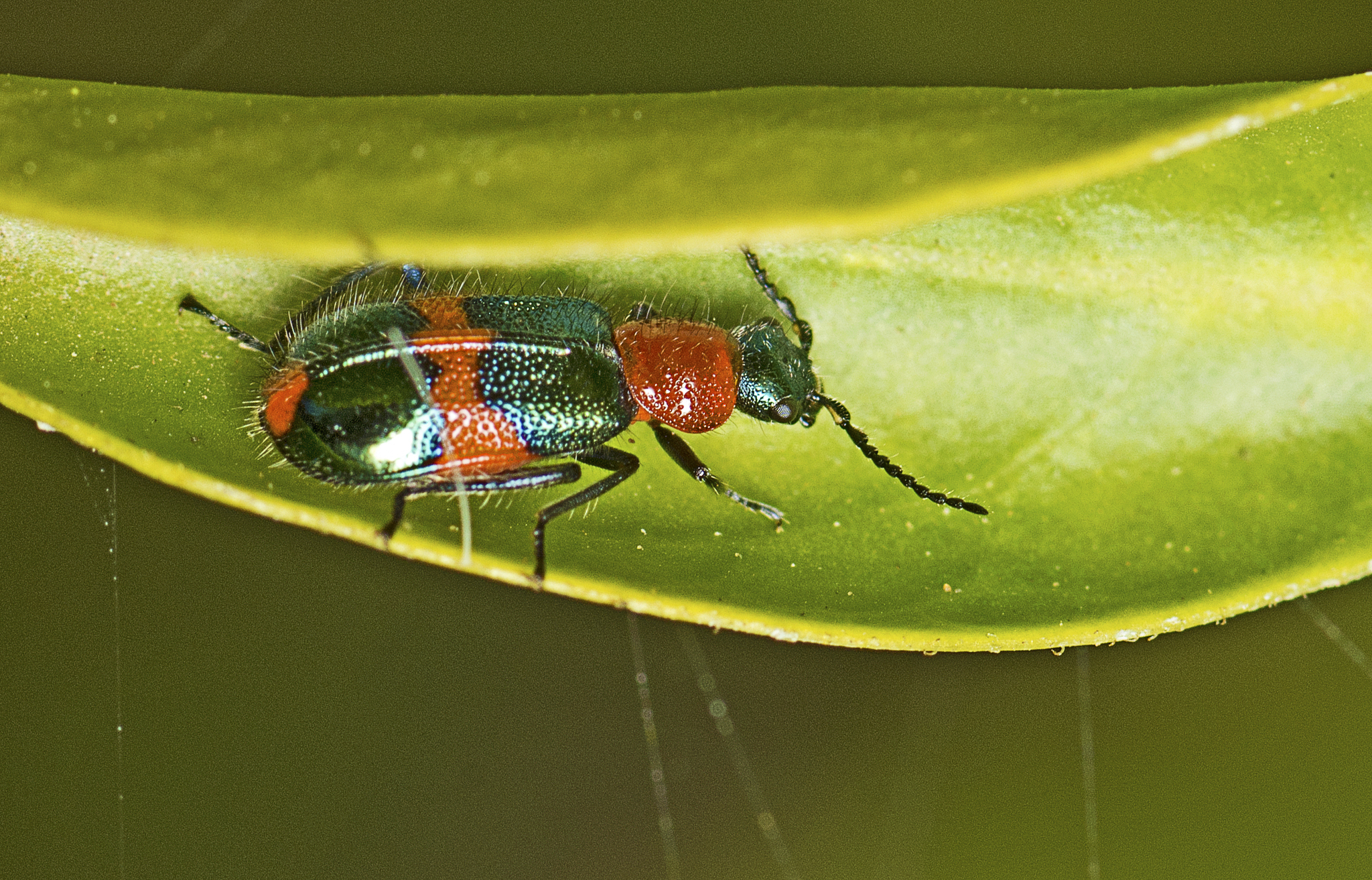
- Dicranolaius bellulus, Australia

Scientific classification
- Domain: Eukaryota
- Kingdom: Animalia
- Phylum: Arthropoda
- Class: Insecta
- Order: Coleoptera
- Suborder: Polyphaga
- Infraorder: Cucujiformia
- Family: Melyridae
- Genus: Dicranolaius
- Species: D. bellulus

Binomial name
- Dicranolaius bellulus (Boisduval, 1835)

Synonyms
- Laius cyanocephalus Lea, 1899; Laius nidicola Lea, 1899; Laius intermedius Lea, 1899; Laius orcicornis Lea, 1899; Malachius bellulus Boisduval, 1835

= Dicranolaius bellulus =

Species of beetle

Dicranolaius bellulus (common name - Red and blue beetle) is a species of soft-winged flower beetle in the family Melyridae, found in Australia, in all mainland states and territories. It was first (partially) described in 1830 by Félix Édouard Guérin-Méneville as Malachius bellulus with the publication of illustrations. However, Guérin-Méneville completed the description with the publication of a text in 1838. Consequently, the Australian Faunal Directory considers the first valid publication to be that of Jean Baptiste Boisduval in 1835 (as Malachius bellulus). Taxonomic reasons for the various synonyms are given in a 2017 paper by Liu, Slipinski and Pang.
