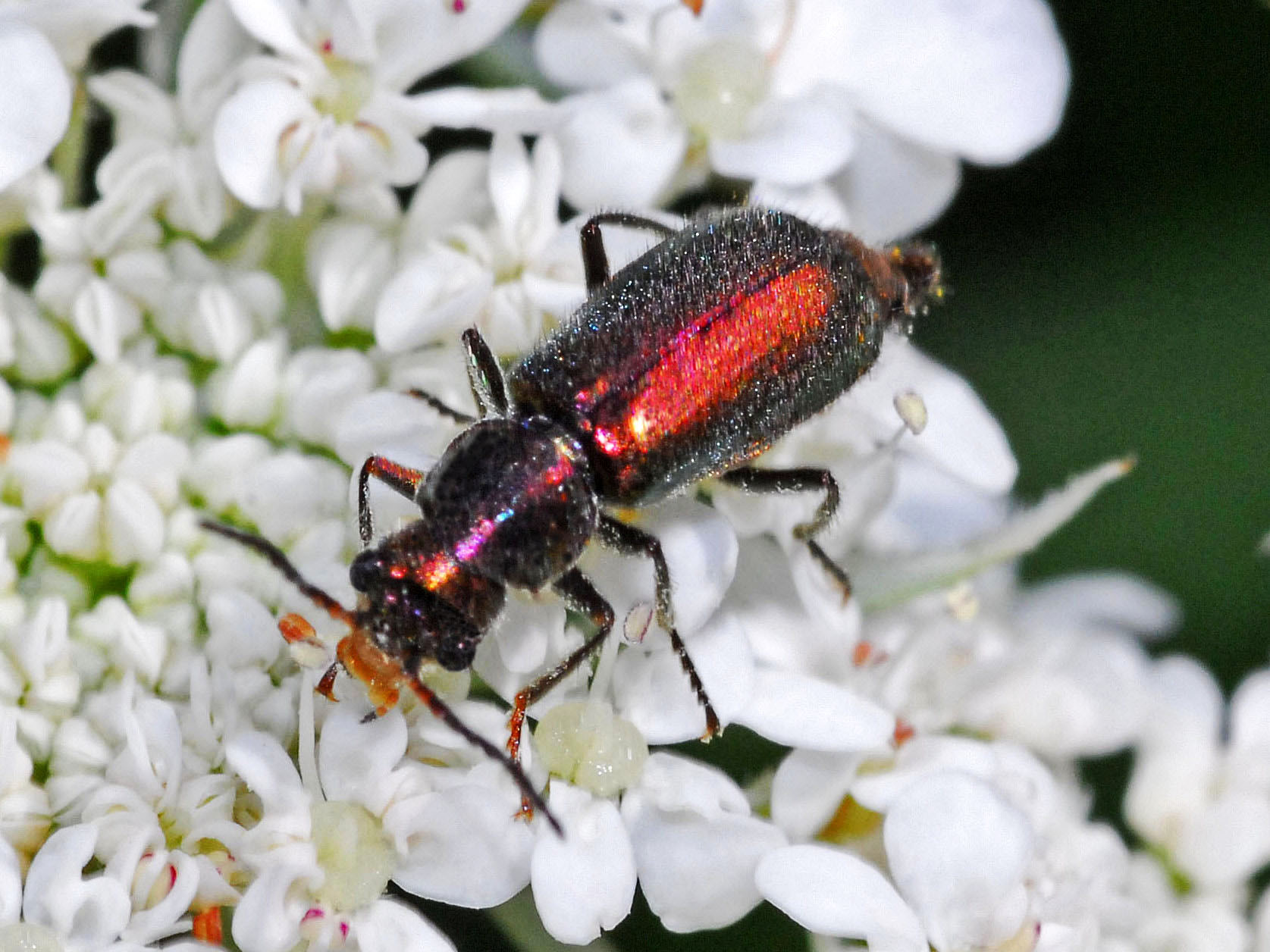
- Female
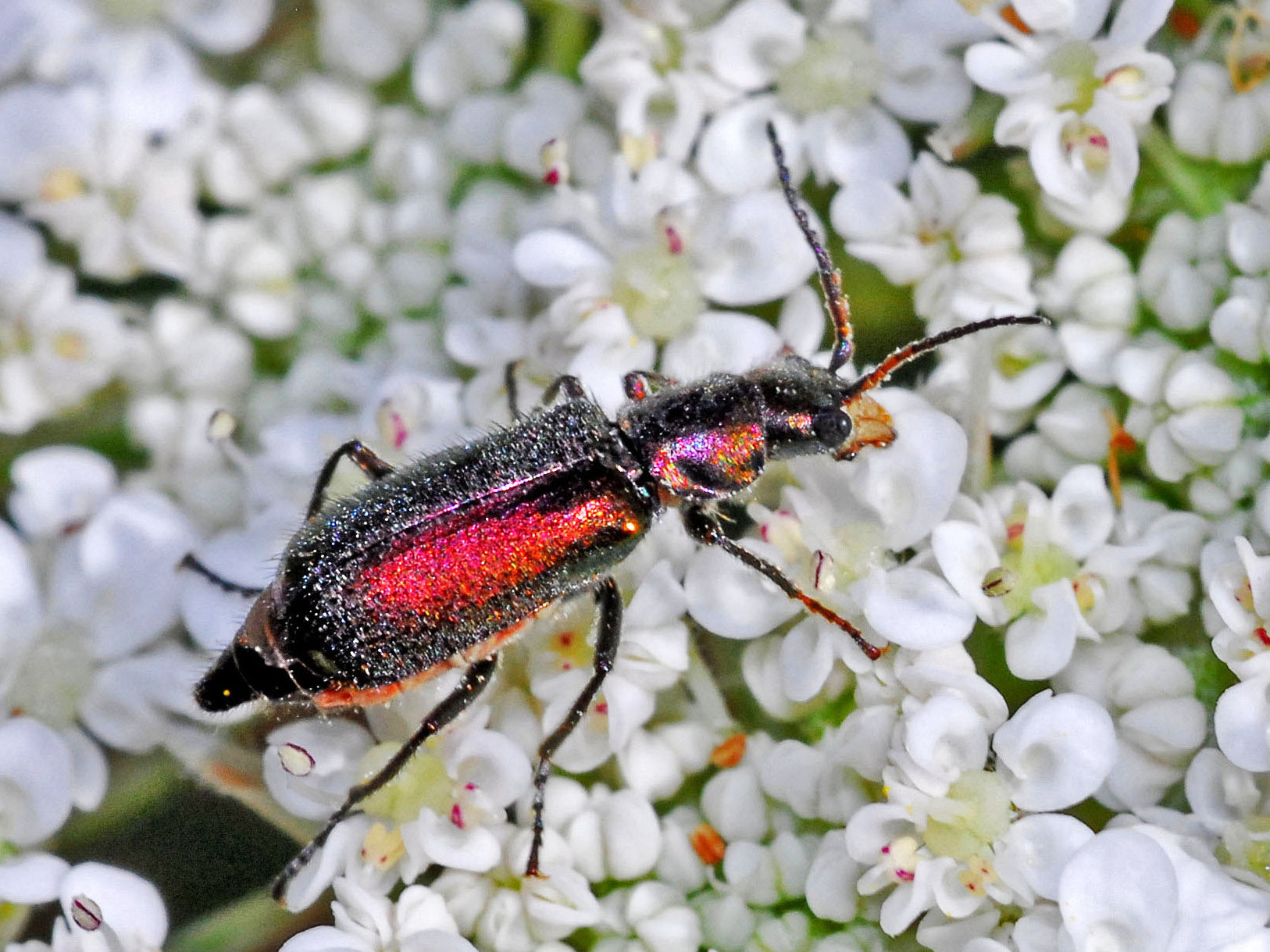
- Side view

Scientific classification
- Kingdom: Animalia
- Phylum: Arthropoda
- Clade: Pancrustacea
- Class: Insecta
- Order: Coleoptera
- Suborder: Polyphaga
- Infraorder: Cucujiformia
- Family: Melyridae
- Genus: Clanoptilus
- Species: C. barnevillei

Binomial name
- Clanoptilus barnevillei (Puton, 1865)

Synonyms
- Malachius barnevillei (Puton, 1865)

= Clanoptilus barnevillei =

Species of beetle

Clanoptilus barnevillei is a species of beetle belonging to the family Melyridae, the soft-winged flower beetles.

== Distribution ==
This species can be found in Southwestern Europe (Southern England, France, Northern Italy, Spain, Southern Sweden and Switzerland). These beetles mainly inhabit Alpes-de-Haute-Provence, Hautes-Alpes and the Pyrenees.

== Description ==
Clanoptilus barnevillei can reach a body length of about 4–5 mm (0.16–0.20 in). Pronotum and elytra are usually monochrome with metallic green or red-orange reflections. The upper surface is very finely pubescent, with also long, erect hair. The tips of the elytra are merely transversely pressed. Excitators are not fully formed. In males there is a narrow transverse excavation at the apex of the elytra, and a strongly developed membrane of the tarsal claws in both sexes. Females have very flebly serrated antennae and shorter and darker than in males. They are characterized by the absence of apical markings on the elytra, by the partially flavous or testaceous color of the front of the head, of the palps and of the anterior and intermediate tarsi. This species is rather similar and may be confused with Clanoptilus affinis, Cordylepherus viridis and Malachius bipustulatus.

== Bibliography ==
- Dieter Matthes – Excitatoren und Paarunsverhalten Mitteleuropaischer Malachiden (Coleopt., Malacodermata) - Zeitschrift für Morphologie und Ökologie der Tiere - Vol. 51, No. 4, pp. 375–546 (in German)
- Mulsant E. - Histoire Naturelle Des Coleopteres de France. Vesiculiferes (Sciences) (French Edition) (French) Paperback (in French)
- Peyron, M.E. (1877) Etude sur les Malachiides d’Europe et du Bassin de la Méditerranée. L’Abeille, Journal d’Entomologie, 15, 3–312.(in French)
