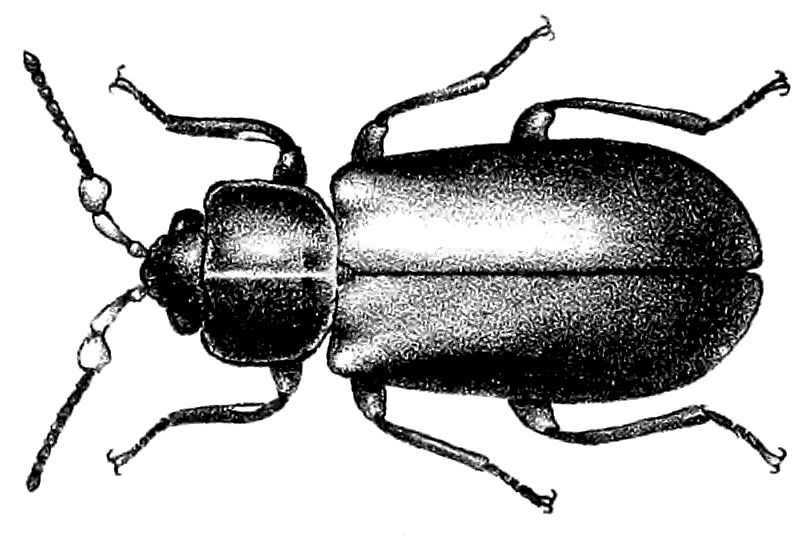
- Laius tibialis

Scientific classification
- Kingdom: Animalia
- Phylum: Arthropoda
- Clade: Pancrustacea
- Class: Insecta
- Order: Coleoptera
- Suborder: Polyphaga
- Infraorder: Cucujiformia
- Family: Melyridae
- Subfamily: Malachiinae
- Tribe: Apalochrini
- Genus: Laius; Guérin-Méneville, 1830

Synonyms
- Megadeuterus Westwood, 1833; Rotomalachius Kôno, 1937; Nossibeus Evers, 1994

= Laius (beetle) =

Genus of beetles

Laius is a genus of soft-winged flower beetles (Melyridae) that belongs to the subfamily Malachiinae. Members of this genus inhabit a wide range which includes East Africa to Southeast Asia, Australia and some islands located in the Pacific Ocean. They can be found inhabiting rocks on the seashore.

Their endophallic structure contains two primary sclerites that are named the gonoporal piece and ligula respectively. It also contains secondary sclerite called the additional sclerite on the basal part of the gonoporal piece in some species and a membranous basal area known as the spinous area that is closely covered with many spines.

== Taxonomy ==
The genus was established in 1830 by Félix Édouard Guérin-Méneville, a French entomologist. Many species that belonged to this genus have been removed and transferred to genera such as Intybia. The genus Nossibeus was synonymised with genus Laius in a 2014 study by Hiroyuki Yoshitomi.

=== Species ===
There are currently 39 described species that belong to this genus. They are listed below:

- Laius adonis (Pic, 1921)
- Laius alleni Lea, 1909
- Laius andamanensis Yoshitomi, 2014
- Laius asahinai Nakane, 1955
- Laius baliensis Yoshitomi, 2014
- Laius corporaali Pic, 1921
- Laius cyaneus Guérin, 1830
- Laius diabolicus Pic, 1905
- Laius etsukoae Sato, Yoshitomi & Ohbayashi, 2006
- Laius fenchihuensis Wittmer, 1982
- Laius flavicornis (Fabricius, 1801)
- Laius keiichii Sato, Yoshitomi & Ohbayashi, 2006
- Laius lutaoensis Yoshitomi & Lee, 2010
- Laius luteonotatus Pic, 1921
- Laius maai Wittmer, 1973
- Laius madli Yoshitomi, 2010
- Laius marchei Pic, 1922
- Laius martirei Constantin, 2015
- Laius miyamotoi Nakane, 1955
- Laius niponicus Lewis, 1895
- Laius pankowi Wittmer, 1999
- Laius parnaudeaui Constantin, 2015
- Laius pici Miwa, 1931
- Laius pisanganus Pic, 1921
- Laius politus Fairmaire, 1880
- Laius purpureipennis Lea, 1916
- Laius rodriguesensis Yoshitomi, 2014
- Laius rufipes Montrouzier, 1860
- Laius sabangensis Wittmer, 1985
- Laius satoi Yoshitomi, 2008
- Laius sericatus Champion, 1924
- Laius simingensis Liu, Qiu & Li, 2026
- Laius submariniformis Wittmer, 1985
- Laius sumatrensis Wittmer, 1954
- Laius taiwanus Yoshitomi & Lee, 2010
- Laius tibialis Gahan, 1900
- Laius triangulatus Wittmer, 1954
- Laius venustus Erichson, 1840
- Laius xiamenensis Liu, Qiu & Li, 2026
