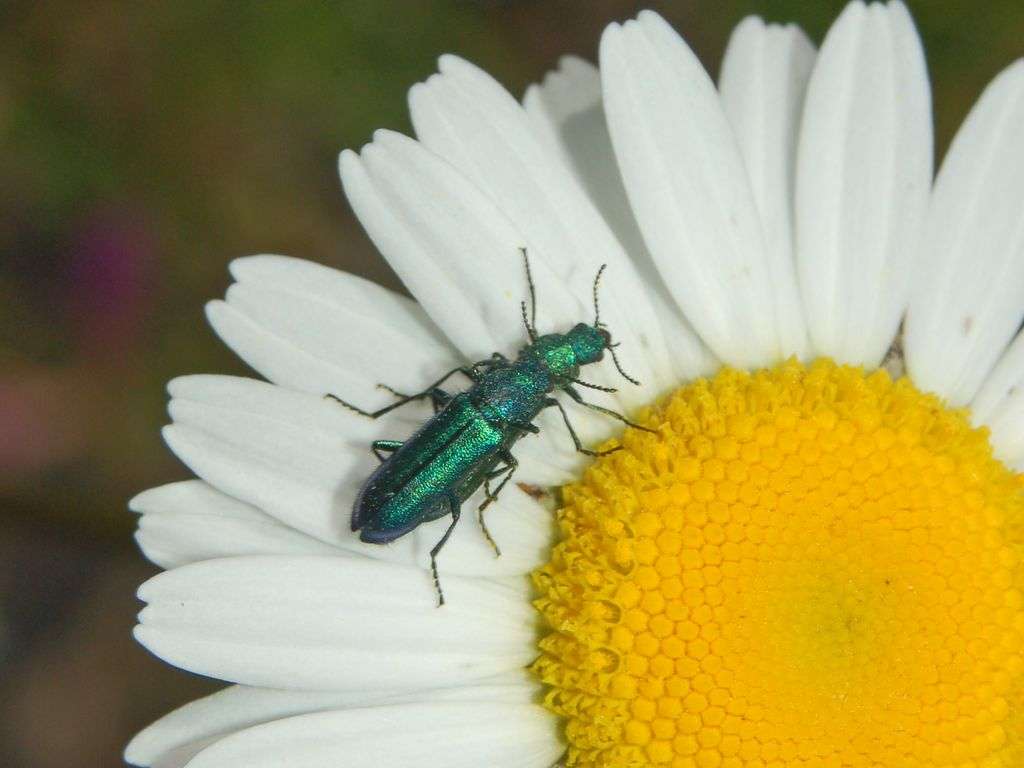
- Psilothrix viridicoerulea. Mating Pair

Scientific classification
- Kingdom: Animalia
- Phylum: Arthropoda
- Class: Insecta
- Order: Coleoptera
- Suborder: Polyphaga
- Infraorder: Cucujiformia
- Family: Melyridae
- Subfamily: Dasytinae
- Genus: Psilothrix; Redtenbacher, 1858

= Psilothrix =

Genus of beetles

Psilothrix is a genus of soft-winged flower beetles belonging to the family Melyridae, subfamily Dasytinae.

== Subgenera and species ==
The genus is divided in the following two subgenera:

- Dolichomorphus Fiori, 1905
- Psilothrix Küster, 1850
  - Psilothrix aureola (Kiesenwetter, 1859)
  - Psilothrix illustris (Wollaston, 1854)
  - Psilothrix latipennis Pic, 1900
  - Psilothrix melanostoma (Brullé, 1832)
  - Psilothrix protensa (Gené, 1836)
  - Psilothrix severa (Kiesenwetter, 1859)
  - Psilothrix smaragdina (Lucas, 1847)
  - Psilothrix ultramarina (Schaufuss, 1867)
  - Psilothrix viridicoerulea (Geoffroy, 1785)

== Gallery ==
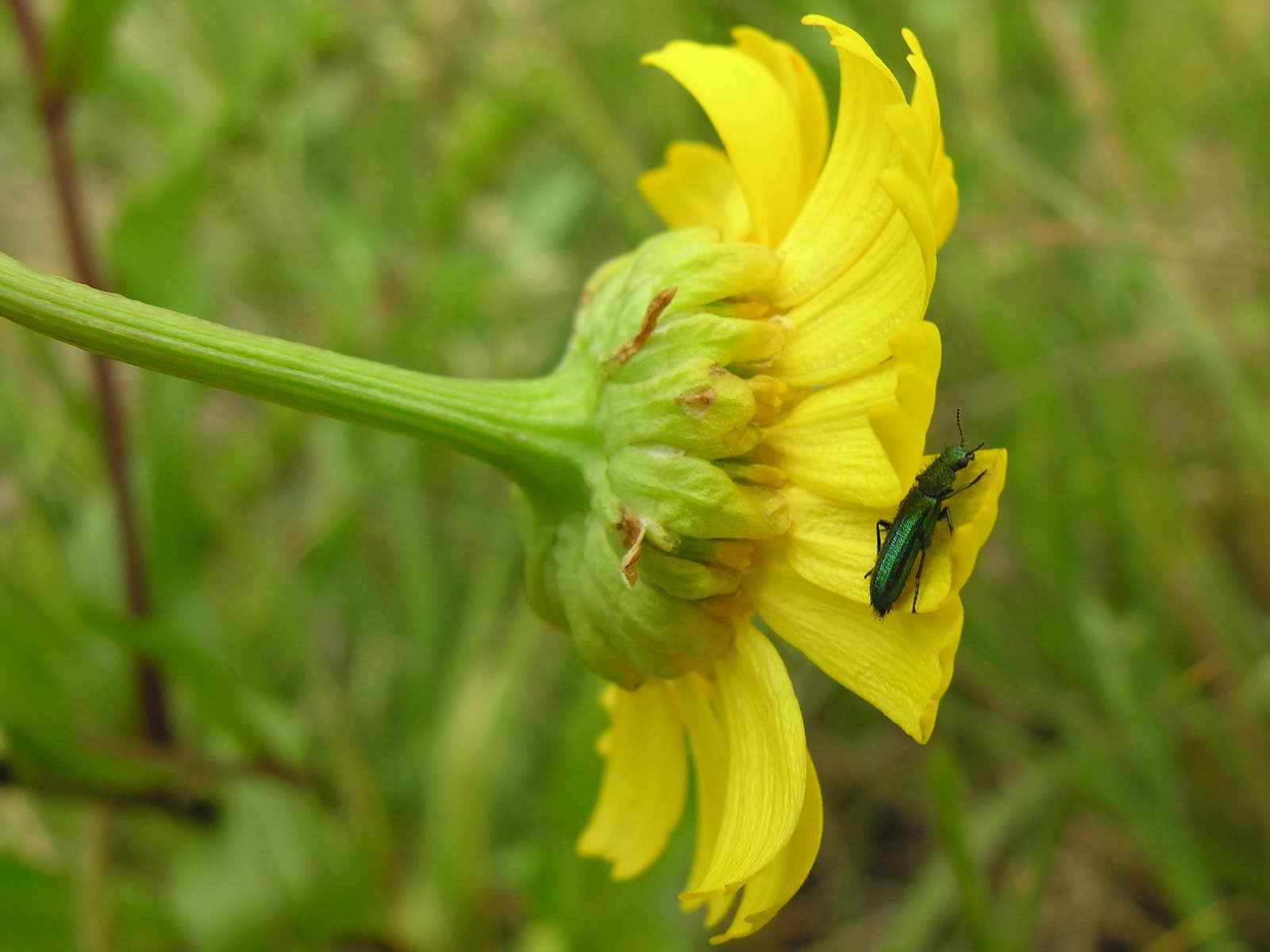
Psilothrix sp.

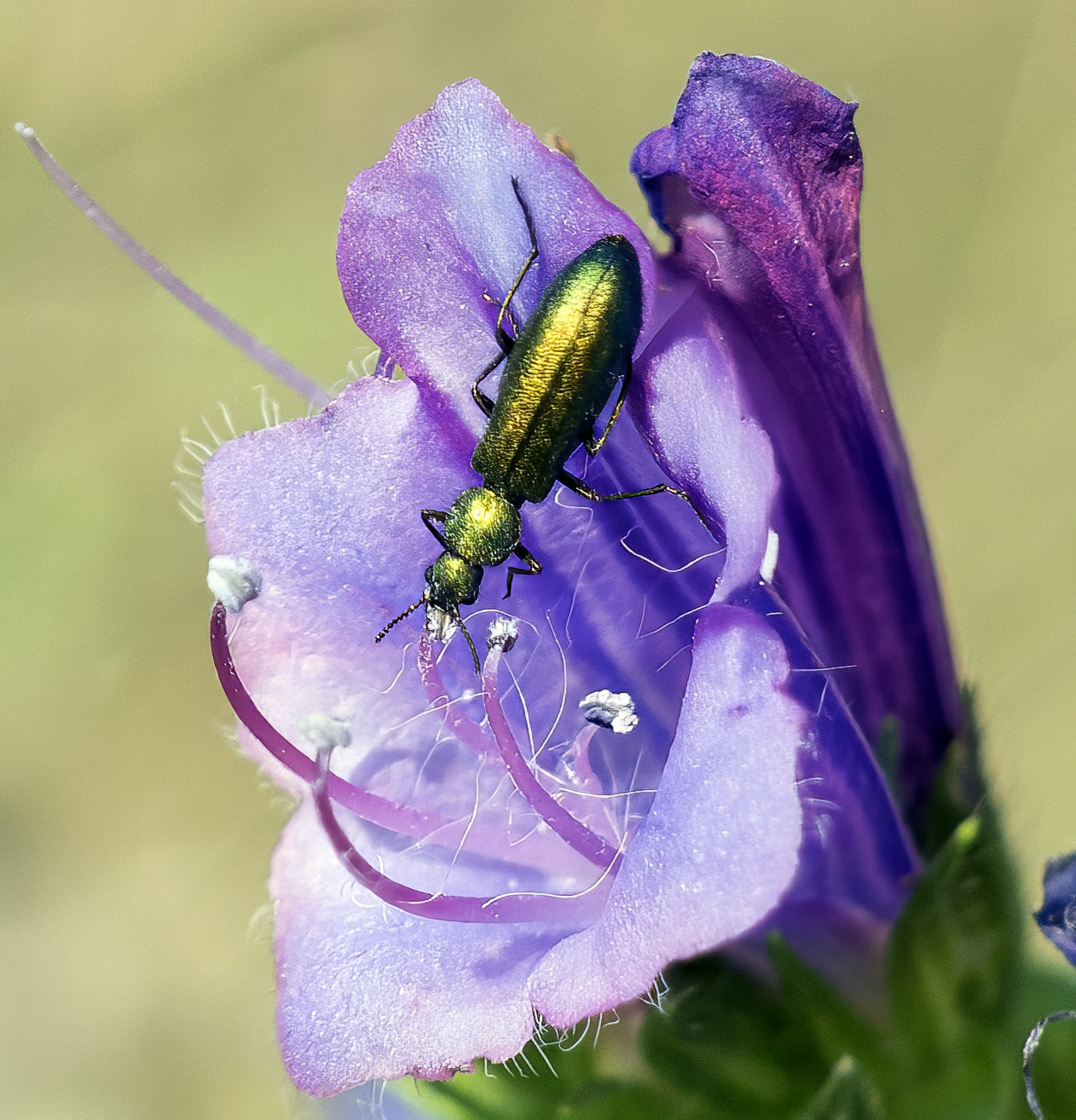
Psilothrix viridicoerulea
