= Endeodes =

Scientific classification
- Kingdom: Animalia
- Phylum: Arthropoda
- Clade: Pancrustacea
- Class: Insecta
- Order: Coleoptera
- Suborder: Polyphaga
- Infraorder: Cucujiformia
- Family: Melyridae
- Tribe: Malachiini
- Genus: Endeodes; LeConte, 1859

Genus of beetles

Endeodes is a genus of soft-winged flower beetles in the family Melyridae. There are about six described species in Endeodes.

== Species ==
These six species belong to the genus Endeodes:

- Endeodes basalis LeConte, 1853
- Endeodes blaisdelli Moore, 1954
- Endeodes collaris LeConte, 1853
- Endeodes insularis Blackwelder, 1932
- Endeodes rugiceps Blackwelder, 1932
- Endeodes terminalis Marshall, 1957
