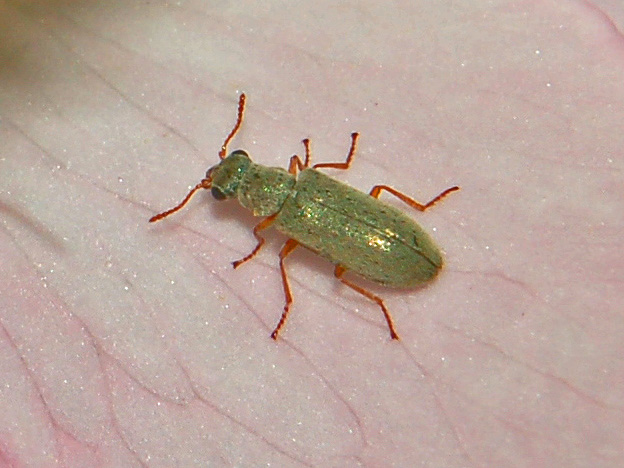
- Danacea species

Scientific classification
- Kingdom: Animalia
- Phylum: Arthropoda
- Class: Insecta
- Order: Coleoptera
- Suborder: Polyphaga
- Infraorder: Cucujiformia
- Family: Melyridae
- Subfamily: Dasytinae
- Tribe: Danaceini
- Genus: Danacea; Laporte de Castelnau, 1836

= Danacea =

Genus of beetles

Danacea is a genus of beetles belonging to the family Melyridae.

== List of species ==
- Danacea acutangula Schilsky, 1897
- Danacea aenea Morawitz, 1861
- Danacea albanica Apfelbeck, 1911
- Danacea amabilis J. Sahlberg, 1903
- Danacea ambigua Mulsant & Rey, 1868
- Danacea angulata (Küster, 1850)
- Danacea atripes Graëlls, 1858
- Danacea aurichalcea (Küster, 1850)
- Danacea barrosi Pic, 1907
- Danacea baudii Schilsky, 1897
- Danacea bleusei Pic, 1895
- Danacea bosnica Pic, 1913
- Danacea bourgeoisi Zürcher, 1911
- Danacea brevipennis Pic, 1932
- Danacea bucciarellii Liberti, 1979
- Danacea bulgarica Pic, 1902
- Danacea caneparii Liberti, 1985
- Danacea caprariae Liberti, 1985
- Danacea cervina (Küster, 1850)
- Danacea championi Marseul, 1878
- Danacea clavipes Schilsky, 1897
- Danacea coiffaiti Constantin, 1990
- Danacea concii Liberti, 1984
- Danacea confinis Schilsky, 1987
- Danacea consimilis Schilsky, 1897
- Danacea constantini Liberti, 1985
- Danacea corsica Kiesenwetter, 1871
- Danacea cretica Kiesenwetter, 1859
- Danacea cusanensis (Costa, 1847)
- Danacea cylindricollis Schilsky, 1897
- Danacea cypria Schilsky, 1897
- Danacea dauci Liberti, 1894
- Danacea delphini Liberti, 1894
- Danacea denticollis Baudi, 1861
- Danacea denticulata Pic, 1903
- Danacea distincta (Lucas, 1849)
- Danacea elongatipennis Pic, 1917
- Danacea eludens Liberti & Schembri, 2002
- Danacea femoralis Schilsky, 1907
- Danacea fuscoaenea Fairmaire, 1880
- Danacea ganglbaueri Prochazka, 1894
- Danacea hispanica Gougelet, 1859
- Danacea hypoleuca Kiesenwetter, 1859
- Danacea ilicis Liberti, 1985
- Danacea imperialis (Gené, 1836)
- Danacea iners Kiesenwetter, 1859
- Danacea insularis Schilsky, 1897
- Danacea intermedia Apfelbeck, 1911
- Danacea jonica Liberti, 1985
- Danacea kiesenwetteri Heyden, 1870
- Danacea korbi Schilsky, 1897
- Danacea krueperi Schilsky, 1897
- Danacea lata Kiesenwetter, 1867
- Danacea latipennis Pic, 1903
- Danacea leonardii Liberti, 1979
- Danacea ligurica Liberti, 1984
- Danacea limbata Schilsky, 1897
- Danacea longiceps Mulsant & Rey, 1868
- Danacea lucana Liberti, 1989
- Danacea luigionii Pic, 1920
- Danacea lusitana Heyden, 1870
- Danacea luteipalpis Schilsky, 1907
- Danacea luteopubens Pic, 1922
- Danacea lysholmi Pic, 1900
- Danacea maculicornis Pic, 1914
- Danacea major Pic, 1902
- Danacea marginata (Küster, 1851)
- Danacea martini Pic, 1904
- Danacea micans Prochazka, 1894
- Danacea milleri Schilsky, 1897
- Danacea minuta Pic, 1894
- Danacea mitis (Küster, 1850)
- Danacea monastirensis Pic, 1917
- Danacea montivaga Mulsant & Rey, 1868
- Danacea moreana Pic, 1905
- Danacea morosa Kiesenwetter, 1863
- Danacea murina (Küster, 1850)
- Danacea mutata Pic, 1895
- Danacea nana Kiesenwetter, 1863
- Danacea neglecta Schilsky, 1897
- Danacea nigripalpis Fiori, 1912
- Danacea nigritarsis (Küster, 1850)
- Danacea nympha Liberti, 1985
- Danacea obscura Schilsky, 1897
- Danacea oertzeni Schilsky, 1897
- Danacea olivacea Baudi, 1873
- Danacea olympiaca Schilsky, 1897
- Danacea opulenta Schilsky, 1897
- Danacea oreas Liberti, 1985
- Danacea pallidipalpis Abeille de Perrin, 1894
- Danacea pallipes (Panzer, 1793)
- Danacea parnassia Schilsky, 1897
- Danacea particeps Mulsant & Rey, 1868
- Danacea pici Bleuse, 1896
- Danacea picicornis (Küster, 1850)
- Danacea poggii Liberti, 1895
- Danacea posterecta Pic, 1902
- Danacea purkynei Obenberger, 1917
- Danacea pygmaea Schaufuss, 1869
- Danacea rambouseki Roubal, 1909
- Danacea retowskii Reitter, 1890
- Danacea romana Pic, 1902
- Danacea rostrata Prochazka, 1894
- Danacea sardoa Kiesenwetter, 1871
- Danacea scyllea Liberti, 1981
- Danacea serbica Kiesenwetter, 1863
- Danacea shardaghensis Apfelbeck, 1918
- Danacea sicana Liberti, 1985
- Danacea sicula Pic, 1895
- Danacea sulcitana Liberti, 1985
- Danacea syrensis Pic, 1910
- Danacea taurica Baudi, 1873
- Danacea taygetana Pic, 1902
- Danacea temporalis Schilsky, 1897
- Danacea thessalonicensis Apfelbeck, 1911
- Danacea thymi Liberti & Schembri, 2002
- Danacea trinacriae Liberti, 1979
- Danacea valonensis Apfelbeck, 1911
- Danacea vitticollis Schilsky, 1897
- Danacea winneguthi Apfelbeck, 1911
- Danacea wittmeri Liberti, 1985
- Danacea ziczac Schaufuss, 1869
