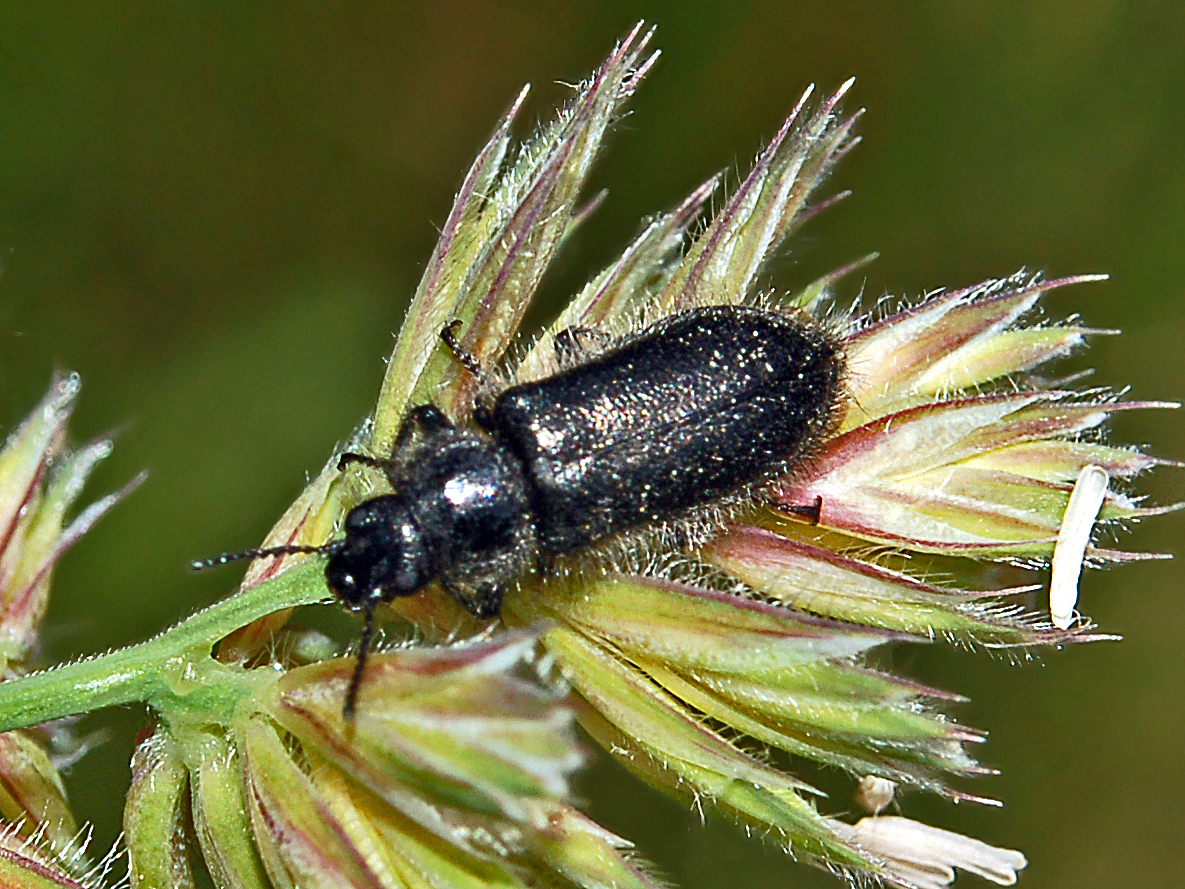
- Enicopus pilosus. Female

Scientific classification
- Domain: Eukaryota
- Kingdom: Animalia
- Phylum: Arthropoda
- Class: Insecta
- Order: Coleoptera
- Suborder: Polyphaga
- Infraorder: Cucujiformia
- Family: Melyridae
- Subfamily: Dasytinae
- Genus: Enicopus; Stephens, 1830

Synonyms
- Henicopus Agassiz, 1846

= Enicopus =

Genus of beetles

Enicopus is a genus of beetles belonging to the family Melyridae, subfamily Dasytinae. Species in this genus are present in most of Europe and in the eastern Palearctic realm.

== Species ==
- Enicopus andradei Pardo, 1966
- Enicopus armatus (Lucas, 1849)
- Enicopus calcaratus Kiesenwetter, 1859
- Enicopus confusus Jacquelin Du Val, 1860
- Enicopus distinguendus Jacquelin Du Val, 1860
- Enicopus espagnoli Pardo, 1966
- Enicopus gracilis Schilsky, 1896
- Enicopus heydeni Kiesenwetter, 1870
- Enicopus hirtus (Linnaeus, 1767)
- Enicopus hoplotarsus Jacquelin Du Val, 1860
- Enicopus ibericus Jacquelin Du Val, 1860
- Enicopus korbi Schilsky, 1896
- Enicopus lagari Pardo, 1966
- Enicopus longimanus Kiesenwetter, 1859
- Enicopus parnassi Kiesenwetter, 1859
- Enicopus paulinoi Bourgeois, 1884
- Enicopus perezi Kiesenwetter, 1867
- Enicopus pilosus (Scopoli, 1763)
- Enicopus pyrenaeus Fairmaire, 1859
- Enicopus rugosicollis Jacquelin Du Val, 1860
- Enicopus scutellaris (Fabricius, 1792)
- Enicopus simplicipes Jacquelin Du Val, 1860
- Enicopus spiniger Jacquelin Du Val, 1860
- Enicopus truncatus Fairmaire, 1859
- Enicopus vittatus Kiesenwetter, 1859
