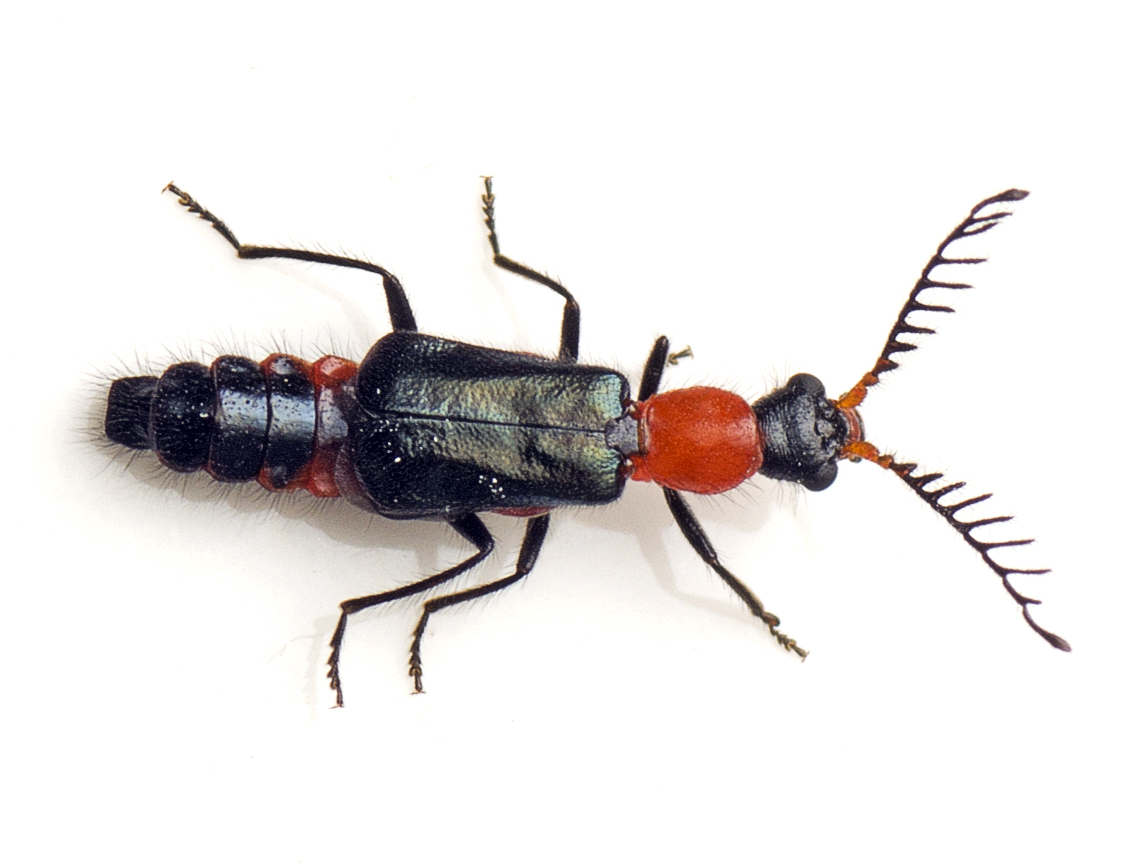
- Balanophorus victoriensis

Scientific classification
- Domain: Eukaryota
- Kingdom: Animalia
- Phylum: Arthropoda
- Class: Insecta
- Order: Coleoptera
- Suborder: Polyphaga
- Infraorder: Cucujiformia
- Family: Melyridae
- Genus: Balanophorus; MacLeay, 1872

= Balanophorus =

Genus of beetles

Balanophorus is a genus of beetles belonging to the family Melyridae.

== Taxonomy ==
The genus Balanophorus was first described by William John Macleay in 1872. The following species are currently recognised in the genus:

- Balanophorus ater Lea, 1909
- Balanophorus biplagiatus Fairmaire, 1879
- Balanophorus brevipennis (Germar, 1848)
- Balanophorus concinnus Lea, 1921
- Balanophorus inaequalis Pic, 1917
- Balanophorus janthinipennis Fairmaire, 1879
- Balanophorus macleayi Lea, 1895
- Balanophorus mastersii Macleay, 1872
- Balanophorus megalops Lea, 1902
- Balanophorus notaticollis Pic, 1917
- Balanophorus pictus Lea, 1909
- Balanophorus scapulatus (Fairmaire, 1879)
- Balanophorus victoriensis Lea, 1909
