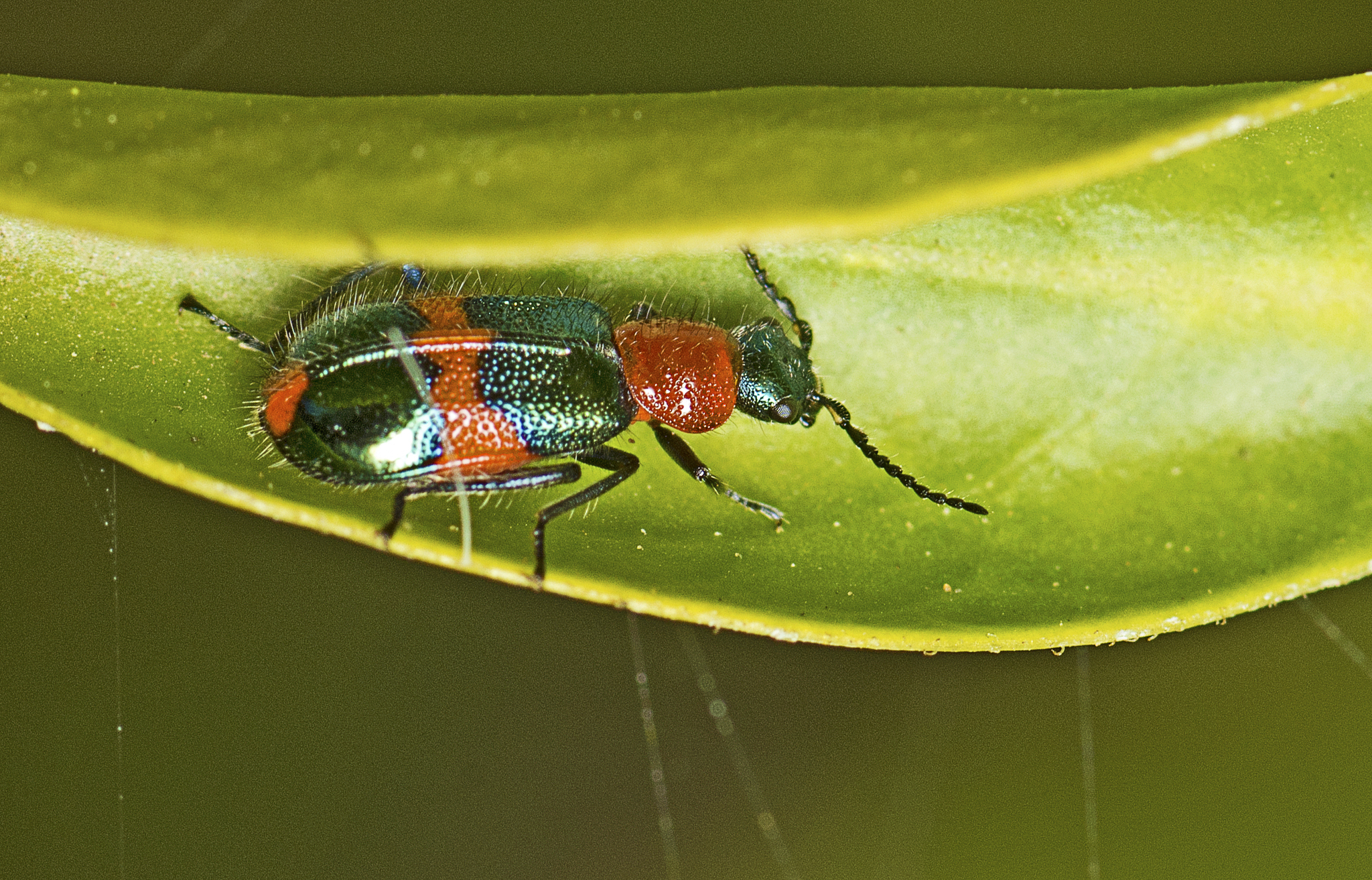
- Dicranolaius bellulus, Australia

Scientific classification
- Kingdom: Animalia
- Phylum: Arthropoda
- Class: Insecta
- Order: Coleoptera
- Suborder: Polyphaga
- Infraorder: Cucujiformia
- Family: Melyridae
- Subfamily: Malachiinae
- Tribe: Malachiini
- Genus: Dicranolaius; Champion, 1921

= Dicranolaius =

Genus of beetles

Dicranolaius is a genus of soft-winged flower beetle in the family Melyridae. These beetles can be found in Asia and Australia.
