= Apalochrus =

Scientific classification
- Kingdom: Animalia
- Phylum: Arthropoda
- Class: Insecta
- Order: Coleoptera
- Suborder: Polyphaga
- Infraorder: Cucujiformia
- Family: Melyridae
- Genus: Apalochrus; Erichson, 1840

Synonyms
- Paratinus Abeille de Perrin, 1891

Genus of beetles

Apalochrus is a genus of beetles belonging to the family Melyridae.

The species of this genus are found in Europe and Africa.

Species:

- Apalochrus femoralis Erichson, 1840
- Apalochrus fulvicollis Gebler, 1844
