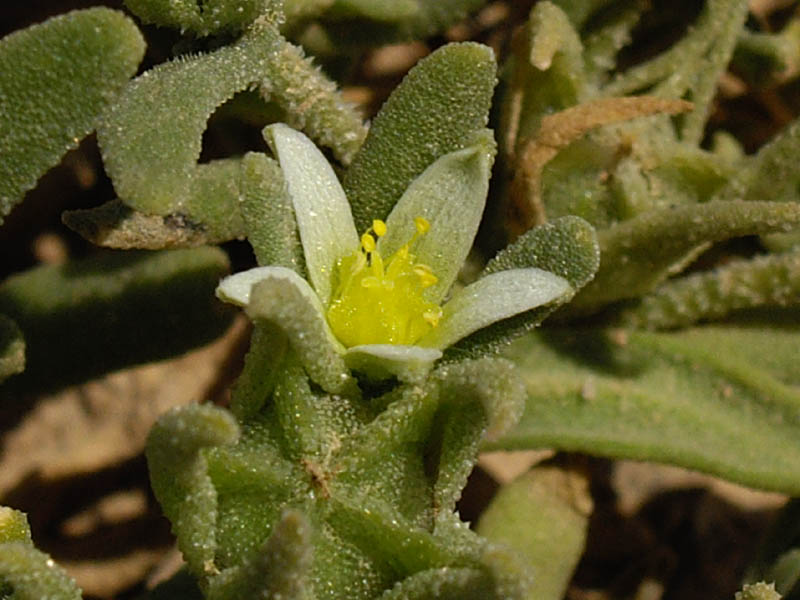
- Aizoanthemum hispanicum

Scientific classification
- Kingdom: Plantae
- Clade: Tracheophytes
- Clade: Angiosperms
- Clade: Eudicots
- Order: Caryophyllales
- Family: Aizoaceae
- Subfamily: Aizooideae
- Genus: Aizoanthemum; Dinter ex Friedrich

Species
- 5; see text

= Aizoanthemum =

Genus of plants

Aizoanthemum is a small genus of plant in the family Aizoaceae, native to southern Angola and western Namibia. It has only 5 species. Before being given their own genus, these species were considered a subgenus of Aizoon. The genus name comes from the Greek "anthemon" (flowering) and for the similarity to the genus Aizoon.

== Species ==
Five species are accepted.

- Aizoanthemum dinteri (Schinz) Friedrich
- Aizoanthemum galenioides (Fenzl ex Sond.) Friedrich
- Aizoanthemum membrum-connectens Dinter ex Friedrich
- Aizoanthemum mossamedense (Welw. ex Oliv.) Friedrich
- Aizoanthemum rehmannii (Schinz) H.E.K.Hartmann

=== Formerly placed here ===
- Aizoanthemopsis hispanica (L.) Klak (as Aizoanthemum hispanicum (L.) H.E.K.Hartmann)

== See also ==
- Kurt Dinter
