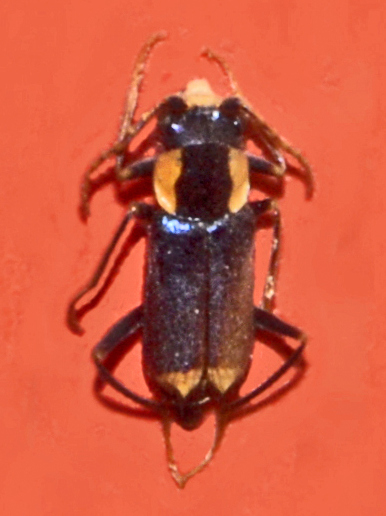
- Clanoptilus marginellus

Scientific classification
- Kingdom: Animalia
- Phylum: Arthropoda
- Clade: Pancrustacea
- Class: Insecta
- Order: Coleoptera
- Suborder: Polyphaga
- Infraorder: Cucujiformia
- Family: Melyridae
- Subfamily: Malachiinae
- Tribe: Malachiini
- Genus: Clanoptilus; Motschulsky, 1853

= Clanoptilus =

Genus of beetles

Clanoptilus is a genus of beetles belonging to the family Melyridae.

== Species ==
- Clanoptilus abdominalis (Fabricius, 1793)
- Clanoptilus affinis (Ménétriés, 1832)
- Clanoptilus ambiguus (Peyron, 1877)
- Clanoptilus arnaizi (Pardo, 1966)
- Clanoptilus barnevillei (Puton, 1865)
- Clanoptilus brodskyi Svihla, 1987
- Clanoptilus calabrus (Baudi, 1873)
- Clanoptilus durandi (Pardo, 1970)
- Clanoptilus elegans (Olivier, 1790)
- Clanoptilus emarginatus (Krauss, 1902)
- Clanoptilus falcifer (Abeille de Perrin, 1882)
- Clanoptilus geniculatus (Germar, 1824)
- Clanoptilus imperialis (Morawitz, 1861)
- Clanoptilus italicus (Pardo, 1967)
- Clanoptilus karpathosensis Wittmer, 1988
- Clanoptilus laticollis (Rosenhauer, 1856)
- Clanoptilus maculiventris (Chevrolat, 1854)
- Clanoptilus marginellus (Olivier, 1790)
- Clanoptilus parilis (Erichson, 1840)
- Clanoptilus rufus (Olivier, 1790)
- Clanoptilus spinipennis (Germar, 1824)
- Clanoptilus spinosus (Erichson, 1840)
- Clanoptilus strangulatus (Abeille de Perrin, 1885)
