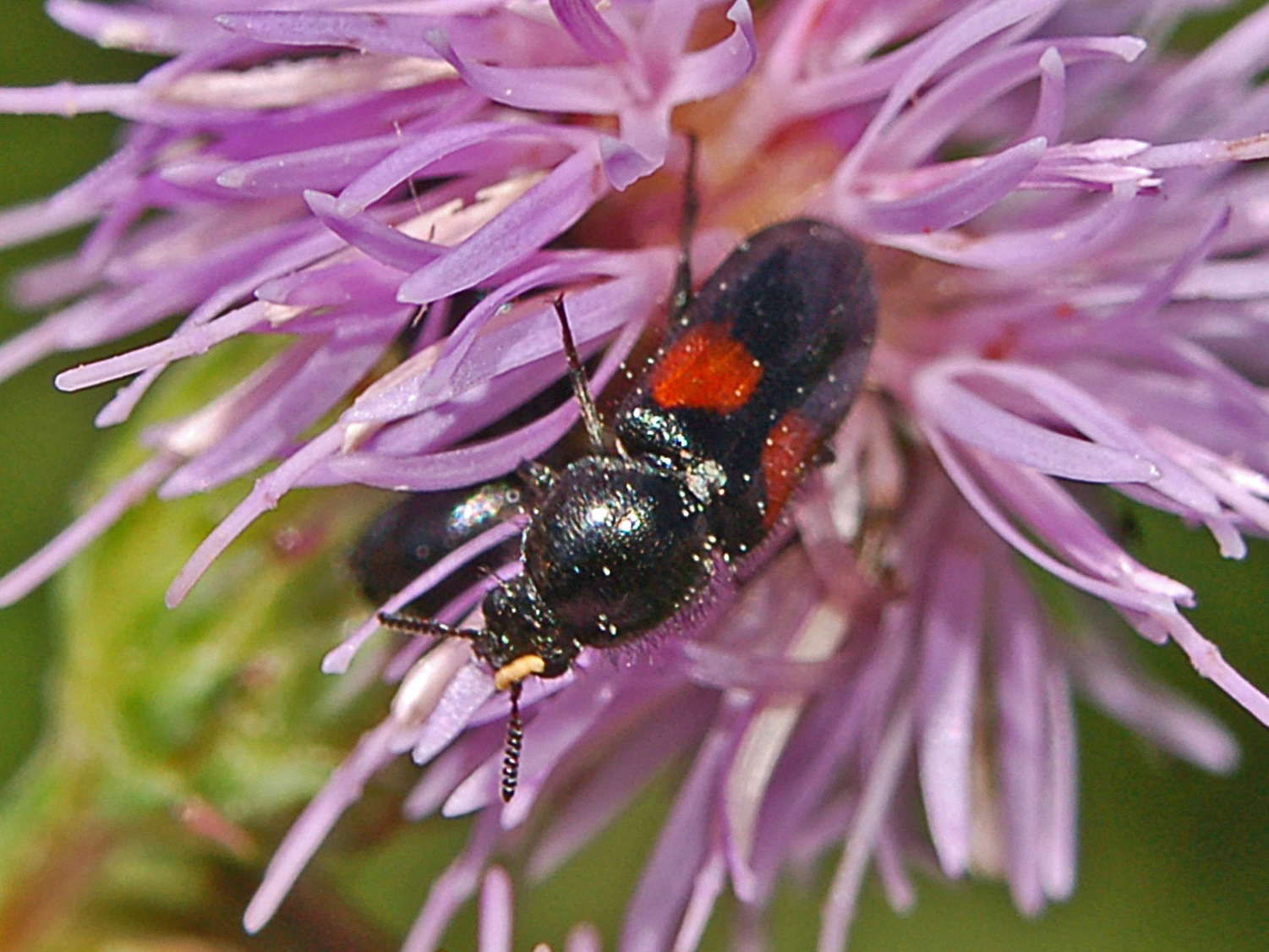
- Divales bipustulatus

Scientific classification
- Kingdom: Animalia
- Phylum: Arthropoda
- Class: Insecta
- Order: Coleoptera
- Suborder: Polyphaga
- Infraorder: Cucujiformia
- Family: Melyridae
- Genus: Divales; Laporte de Castelnau, 1836

= Divales =

Divales bipustulatus

Genus of beetles

Divales is a genus of beetles belonging to the family Melyridae.

== List of species ==
- Divales bipustulatus (Fabricius, 1781)
- Divales cinctus (Gené, 1839)
- Divales communimacula (Costa, 1847)
- Divales haemorrhoidalis (Fabricius, 1798)
- Divales mauritanicus (Lucas, 1849)
- Divales quadrimaculatus (Olivier, 1790)
- Divales uhligi Majer, 1984
- Divales weisei Schilsky, 1894
