= Chalicorus =

Scientific classification
- Kingdom: Animalia
- Phylum: Arthropoda
- Class: Insecta
- Order: Coleoptera
- Suborder: Polyphaga
- Infraorder: Cucujiformia
- Family: Melyridae
- Genus: Chalicorus; Erichson, 1840

Type species
- Chalicorus vinula Erichson, 1840

Species
- Several (see text)

Synonyms
- Chalicocorus Agassiz, 1846

Genus of beetles

Chalicorus is a genus of beetles in the family Melyridae. They occur in Sub-Saharan Africa.

== Species ==
There are several species, including at least the following:

- Chalicorus bisellatus Champion, 1922
- Chalicorus flavofasciatus Champion, 1922
- Chalicorus macphersonae Wittmer, 1988
- Challcorus namaquaensis Wittmer, 1988
- Chalicorus nigricollis Champion, 1922
- Chalicorus reflexipennis Wittmer, 1985
- Chalicorus toruseus Wittmer, 1988
- Chalicorus vinula Erichson, 1840
