= Chalchas =

Scientific classification
- Kingdom: Animalia
- Phylum: Arthropoda
- Class: Insecta
- Order: Coleoptera
- Suborder: Polyphaga
- Infraorder: Cucujiformia
- Family: Melyridae
- Subfamily: Melyrinae
- Tribe: Astylini
- Genus: Chalchas; Blanchard, 1845

Synonyms
- Chalcas Buquet, 1838 (Unav.); Chalcas Blanchard, 1845 (Missp.); Chalcas Fairmaire, 1847 (Emend.); Calchas Klug, 1850 (Missp.); Chalcas (Chalcomorphus) Pic, 1919; Chalcas (Dimorphochalcas) Pic, 1919; Chalcas (Morphochalcas) Pic, 1919; Chalcas (Pseudoastylus) Pic, 1919

Genus of beetles

Chalchas is a genus of South American beetles in the family Melyridae, very commonly misspelled as Chalcas (e.g.).

== Species ==
- Chalchas bremei Fairmaire, 1847
- Chalchas cyaneus Fairmaire, 1847
- Chalchas fairmairei Bourgeois, 1900
- Chalchas fumatus Fairmaire, 1849
- Chalchas humeralis Fairmaire, 1847
- Chalchas lajoyei Pic, 1919
- Chalchas lateralis Fairmaire, 1847
- Chalchas lineatocollis Fairmaire, 1847
- Chalchas lugubris Fairmaire, 1849
- Chalchas obesus Fairmaire, 1847
- Chalchas plicatus Pic, 1919
- Chalchas sallei Fairmaire, 1878
- Chalchas sexplagiatus Fairmaire, 1847
- Chalchas suturalis Pic, 1921
- Chalchas trabeatus Fairmaire, 1847
- Chalchas turgidus Erichson, 1848
- Chalchas unicolor Fairmaire, 1847
