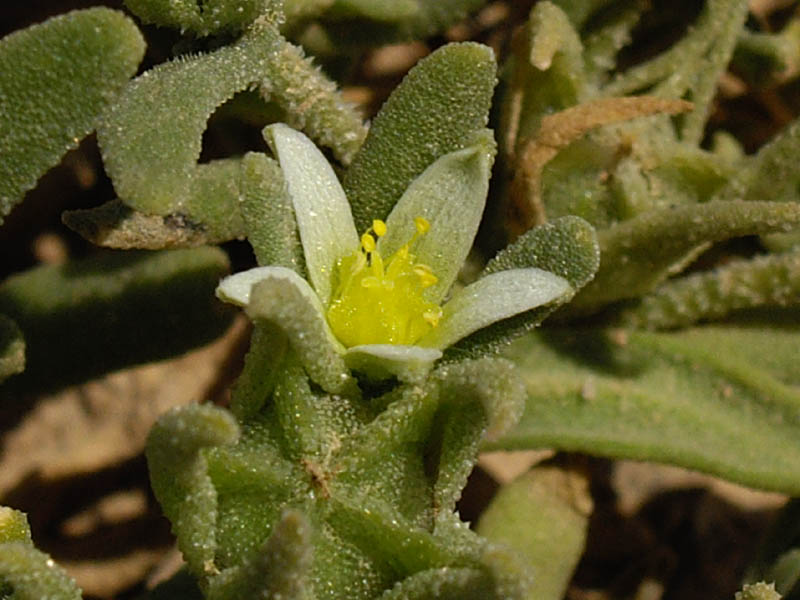

Scientific classification
- Kingdom: Plantae
- Clade: Tracheophytes
- Clade: Angiosperms
- Clade: Eudicots
- Order: Caryophyllales
- Family: Aizoaceae
- Subfamily: Aizooideae
- Genus: Aizoanthemopsis; Klak
- Species: A. hispanica

Binomial name
- Aizoanthemopsis hispanica (L.) Klak

Synonyms
- Aizoanthemum hispanicum (L.) H.E.K.Hartmann; Aizoon hispanicum L.; Aizoon sessiliflorum Moench

= Aizoanthemopsis =

Genus of flowering plants

Aizoanthemopsis hispanica, or Spanish aizoon, is a species of flowering plant in the family Aizoaceae. It is the sole species in genus Aizoanthemopsis. It is a succulent native to northern Africa, the Mediterranean region and the Middle East where it grows on arid sandy plains, saline areas and in semi-arid habitats.

It was first described as Aizoon hispanicum by the Swedish naturalist Carl Linnaeus in 1753. In 2002 it was placed in the genus Aizoanthemum by the German botanist Heidrun Hartmann. In 2017 Cornelia Klak placed the species in the newly-described monotypic genus Aizoanthemopsis.

== Description ==
A. hispanica is a sprawling annual herbaceous plant 5 to 20 cm (2 to 8 in) high with opposite, papillose, succulent leaves. These are lanceolate with entire margins. The solitary flowers have five white tepals which are yellowish green on the outside, 5 to 15 stamens and an ovary with 5 locules giving a pentagonal fruit capsule containing 2 brown seeds in each locule.

The fruits have an unusual mechanism for dispersing the seeds. When it rains, the locules gradually fill with water. Near the centre of the capsule, the covering membranes are arranged in such a way that they form a nozzle, and when further rain drops fall on the capsule, a jet of water and seeds is propelled through this nozzle; this allows the plant to scatter its seeds much more widely than is the case in related species that lack this mechanism.

== Distribution and habitat ==
A. hispanica is native to Egypt, Israel, Jordan, Syria, Cyprus, Turkey, Iraq, Iran and the Arabian Peninsula where it grows in compacted sandy soil in desert plains, saline areas and semi-arid regions. It also grows in the Mediterranean region and the Canary Islands.

== Ecology ==
It has been found that the seeds of A. hispanica germinate poorly in the laboratory when placed on a filter paper in the dark at 30 °C (86 °F). The germination rate can be improved by placing some soil nearby, by covering the seeds for a few days and then uncovering them, or by placing some covered seeds nearby. This suggests that both soil and covered seeds give out some gas, possibly ethylene, which stimulates germination in nearby uncovered seeds.
