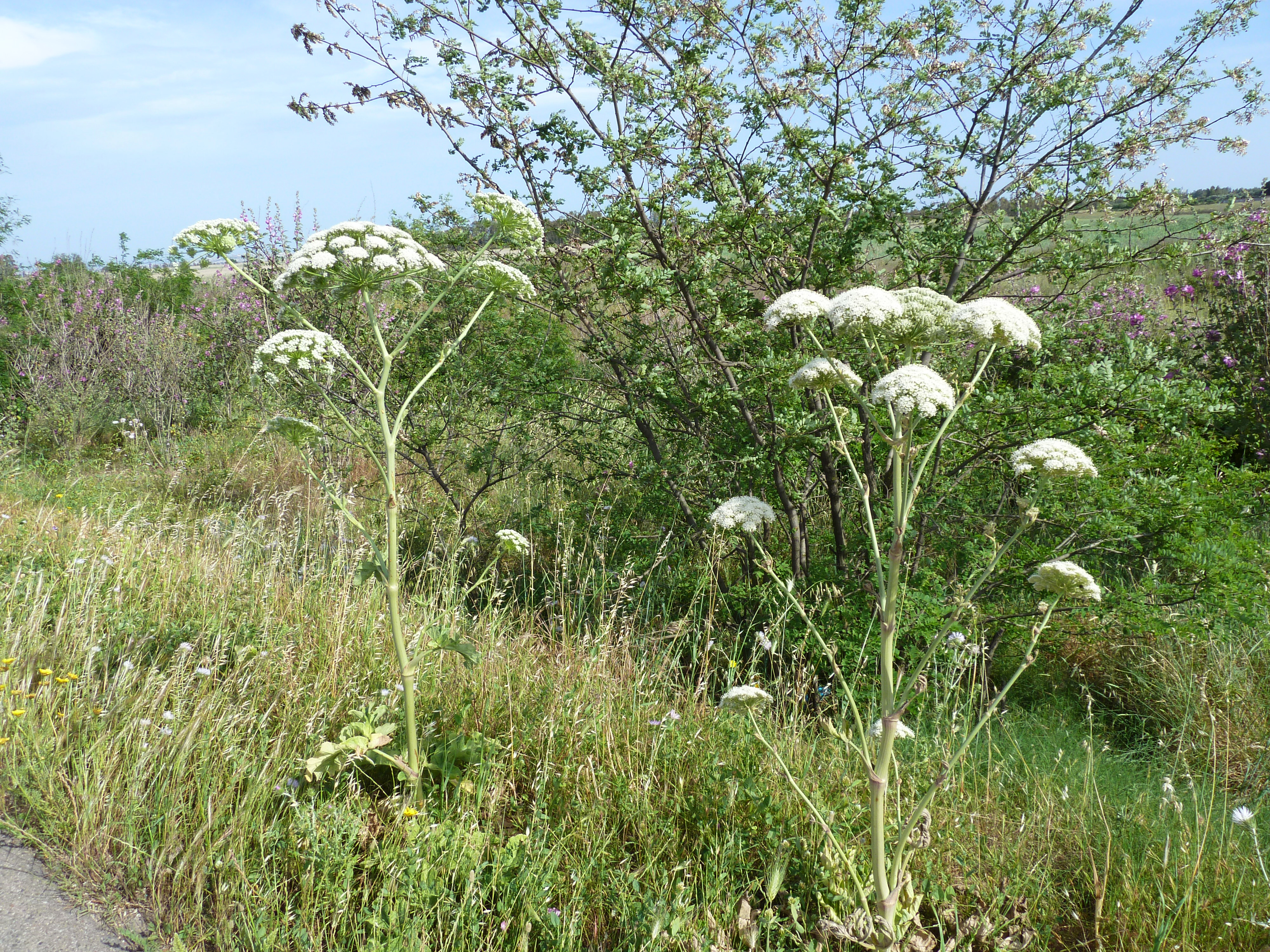
- Magydaris pastinacea

Scientific classification
- Kingdom: Plantae
- Clade: Embryophytes
- Clade: Tracheophytes
- Clade: Angiosperms
- Clade: Eudicots
- Clade: Asterids
- Order: Apiales
- Family: Apiaceae
- Subfamily: Apioideae
- Genus: Magydaris; W.D.J.Koch ex DC.

Species
- See text.

Synonyms
- Eriocachrys DC.

= Magydaris =

Genus of flowering plants

Magydaris is a genus of perennial herbs in the family Apiaceae, native to the western and central Mediterranean.

== Species ==
As of December 2022, Plants of the World Online accepted two species:

- Magydaris panacifolia (Vahl) Lange – Iberian Peninsula and northwestern Africa
- Magydaris pastinacea (Lam.) Paol. – southern Italy and Sardinia to northwestern Africa
