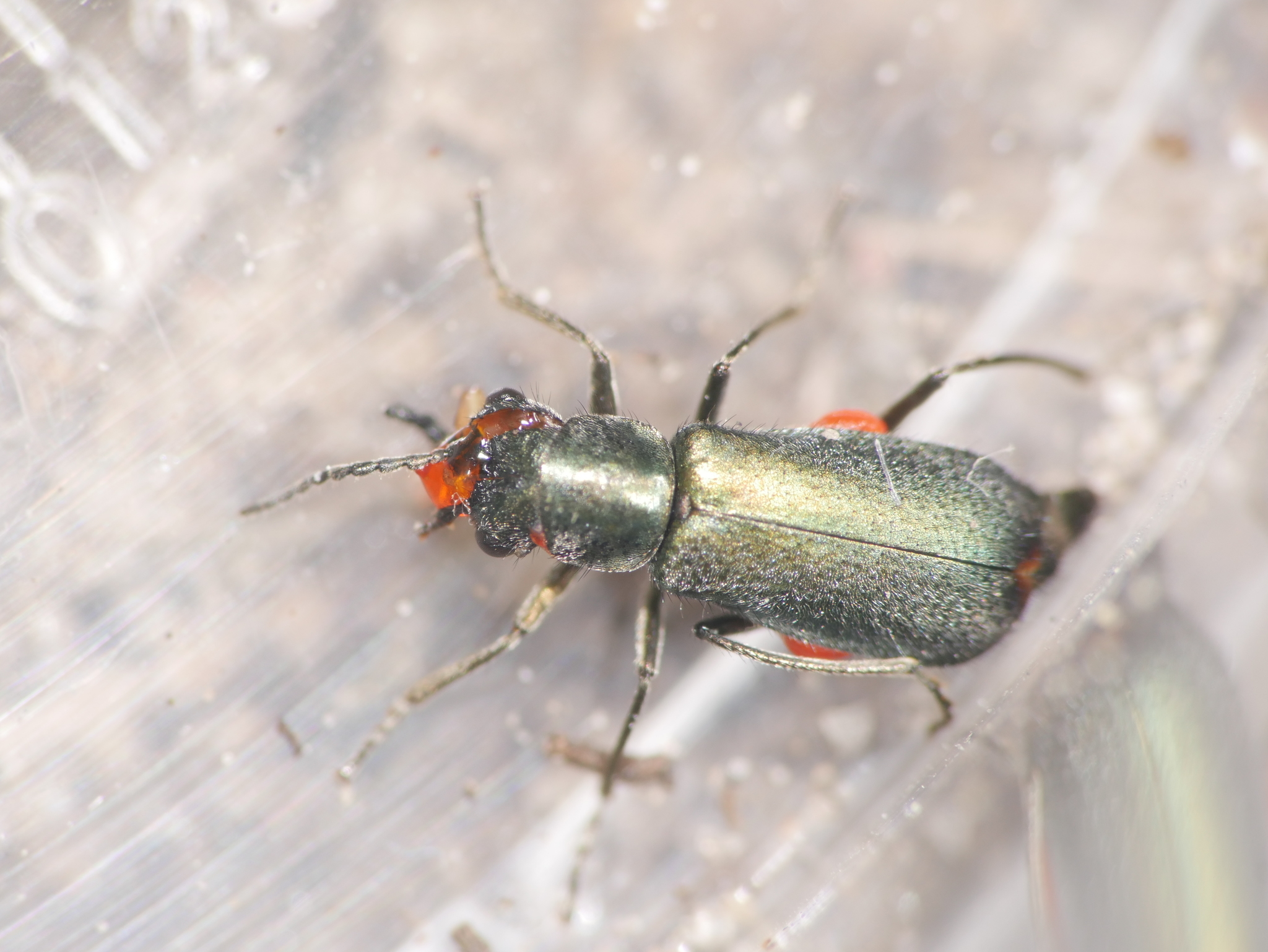
- Cordylepherus viridis

Scientific classification
- Domain: Eukaryota
- Kingdom: Animalia
- Phylum: Arthropoda
- Class: Insecta
- Order: Coleoptera
- Suborder: Polyphaga
- Infraorder: Cucujiformia
- Family: Melyridae
- Genus: Cordylepherus; Evers, 1985

= Cordylepherus =

Genus of beetles

Cordylepherus is a genus of beetles belonging to the family Melyridae. The species of this genus are found in Europe.

== Species ==
The following species are recognised in the genus Cordylepherus:

- Cordylepherus linearis (Morawitz, 1861)
- Cordylepherus oberthuerii (Uhagon, 1879)
- Cordylepherus sierranus (Evers, 1945)
- Cordylepherus sponsus (Abeille, 1883)
- Cordylepherus viridis (Fabricius, 1787)
