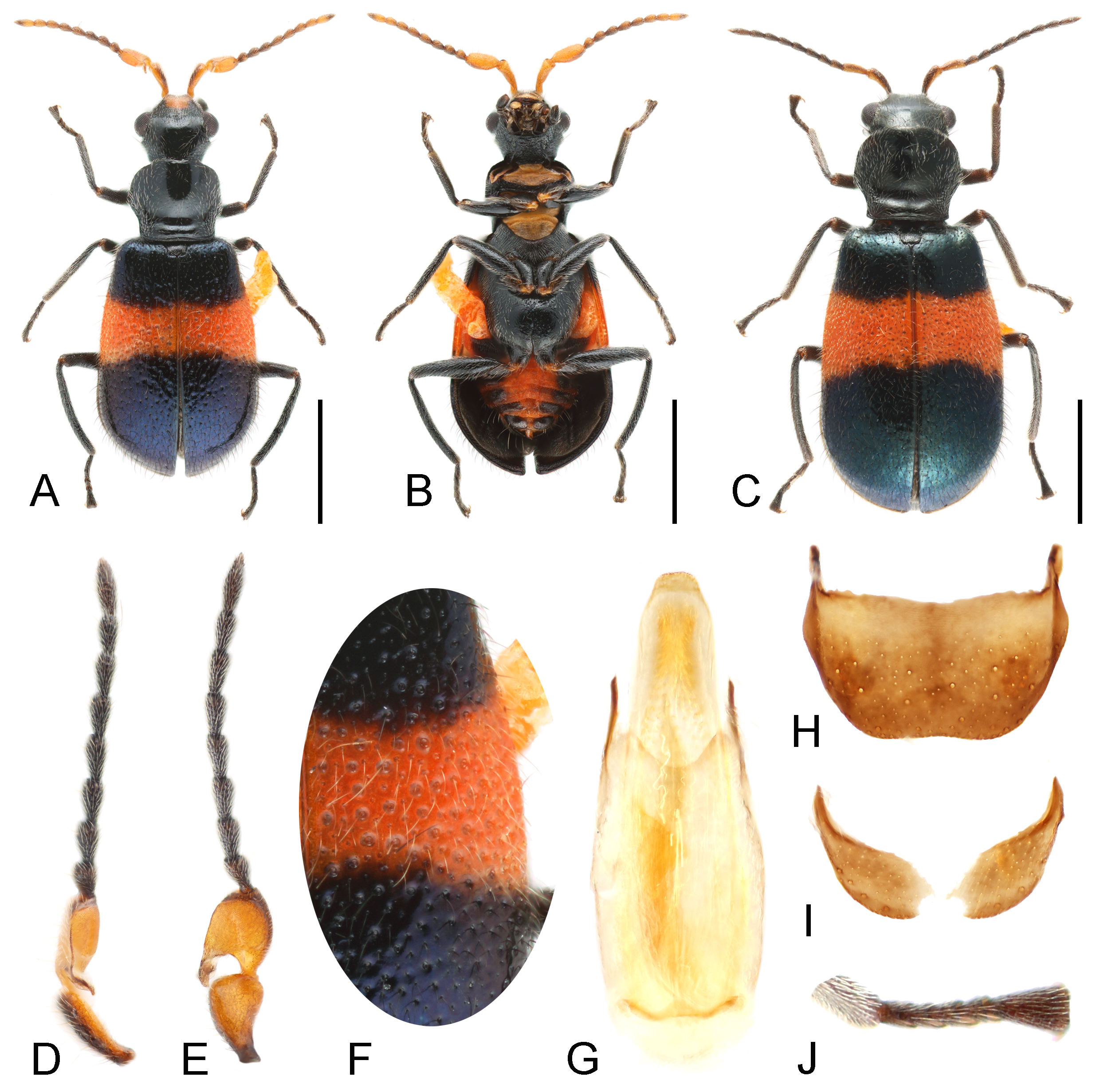
- Intybia swatowensis

Scientific classification
- Kingdom: Animalia
- Phylum: Arthropoda
- Clade: Pancrustacea
- Class: Insecta
- Order: Coleoptera
- Suborder: Polyphaga
- Infraorder: Cucujiformia
- Family: Melyridae
- Tribe: Apalochrini
- Genus: Intybia; Pascoe, 1866

Type species
- Intybia guttata Pascoe, 1866

= Intybia =

Genus of beetles

Intybia is a genus of melyrid beetle in the subfamily Malachiinae. The genus has a large number of species in Africa and Asia. Along with some other Malachiinae, they have a peculiar life cycle with the first larval instar inactive which has been called as "foetometamorphosis". Males have an enlarged and oddly-shaped third antennal segment. The antenna have 10 segments. The tribe Apalochrini has sometimes been included within the Malachiini.

== Species ==
Species that have been included in the genus are:

- Intybia afghanistanica (Wittmer, 1956)
- Intybia alboarcuata (Champion, 1921)
- Intybia alorensis (Pic, 1913)
- Intybia amaenus (Bourgeois, 1890)
- Intybia annamita (Pic, 1908)
- Intybia aurantiaca (Abeille de Perrin, 1890)
- Intybia baeri (Fairmaire, 1898)
- Intybia balteata (Erichson, 1840)
- Intybia bengalensis (Wittmer, 1986)
- Intybia biguttula (Erichson, 1840)
- Intybia birmanica (Champion, 1921)
- Intybia bivittata (Wittmer, 1955)
- Intybia boettcheri (Wittmer, 1941)
- Intybia boysi (Champion, 1921)
- Intybia brancuccii (Wittmer, 1989)
- Intybia bulbifer (Champion, 1921)
- Intybia burmensis (Wittmer, 1986)
- Intybia caeruleipennis (Pic, 1914)
- Intybia canaliculata (Wittmer, 1986)
- Intybia carinaticeps (Pic, 1905)
- Intybia championi Wittmer, 1997
- Intybia concha Asano, 2015
- Intybia confluens (Wittmer, 1941)
- Intybia cribrosa (Pic, 1937)
- Intybia curvata Wittmer, 1997
- Intybia dentatithorax (Pic, 1917)
- Intybia denticollis (Wittmer, 1990)
- Intybia denticornis (Champion, 1921)
- Intybia dimidiata (Plavistshikov, 1917)
- Intybia diversenotata (Pic, 1910)
- Intybia dohertyi (Pic, 1910)
- Intybia doipuiensis Wittmer, 1997
- Intybia donan Ikeda & Yoshitomi, 2017
- Intybia drescheri (Wittmer, 1938)
- Intybia duplex (Champion, 1921)
- Intybia erectodentatus (Wittmer, 1982)
- Intybia eversi (Hicker, 1949)
- Intybia externenotata (Pic, 1913)
- Intybia fasciata (Bourgeois)
- Intybia filamentaria (Lea)
- Intybia fissispina (Wittmer, 1938)
- Intybia fossigera (Wittmer, 1990)
- Intybia fouqueti (Pic)
- Intybia foveicornis (Pic, 1917)
- Intybia gressitti (Wittmer)
- Intybia guttata Pascoe, 1866
- Intybia hainanensis Wang & Liu, 2024
- Intybia hamata (Wittmer)
- Intybia harmandi (Pic, 1922)
- Intybia histrio (Kiesenwetter, 1874)
- Intybia impressicornis Wittmer, 1997
- Intybia inarmata (Pic, 1917)
- Intybia indiana (Pic, 1913)
- Intybia jocelynae (Wittmer, 1986)
- Intybia jucunda (Bourgeois, 1891)
- Intybia juengeri (Wittmer, 1986)
- Intybia kanarensis (Pic, 1917)
- Intybia kawasakii (Nakane, 1956)
- Intybia kishiii (Nakane, 1955)
- Intybia klapperichi (Hicker, 1949)
- Intybia korshunovi Tshernyshev, 2016
- Intybia krali (Wittmer, 1996)
- Intybia kurosawai (Wittmer, 1986)
- Intybia latebasilis (Pic, 1936)
- Intybia latefasciatus (Pic, 1919)
- Intybia latemaculata (Pic, 1927)
- Intybia laterufa (Pic, 1928)
- Intybia lombokana (Pic, 1910)
- Intybia lueoendi (Wittmer, 1986)
- Intybia lunata (Champion, 1921)
- Intybia luteofasciata (Pic, 1908)
- Intybia luteonotata (Pic, 1921)
- Intybia luzonica Wittmer, 1997
- Intybia majeri Wittmer, 1997
- Intybia malaccanus (Pic, 1937)
- Intybia malleifer (Champion, 1921)
- Intybia manfredjaechi Plonski, 2014
- Intybia meyi Plonski, 2014
- Intybia mindoroica Wittmer, 1997
- Intybia nicobarensis (Evers, 1990)
- Intybia niponica (Lewis, 1895)
- Intybia nitida (Pic, 1948)
- Intybia nitidicollis (Wittmer, 1994)
- Intybia nodifrons (Champion, 1921)
- Intybia nuristanica (Wittmer, 1989)
- Intybia oblongoguttata (Wittmer, 1953)
- Intybia pacholatkoi Plonski & Geiser, 2014
- Intybia pakistanica (Wittmer, 1986)
- Intybia pangantihoni Plonski, 2014
- Intybia partepolita (Wittmer, 1986)
- Intybia pashtun (Wittmer, 1989)
- Intybia pelegrini (Pic, 1910)
- Intybia pengaronica Wittmer, 1997
- Intybia picta (Erichson)
- Intybia plagiata (Walker, 1858)
- Intybia planicornis (Wittmer, 1982)
- Intybia plonskii Tshernyshev, 2016
- Intybia politithorax Wittmer, 1997
- Intybia prudeki Wittmer, 1997
- Intybia punctatipennis (Pic)
- Intybia quadriguttata (Erichson, 1840)
- Intybia quadristrigata (Champion, 1921)
- Intybia raffrayi (Gorham, 1883)
- Intybia ranuensis (Wittmer, 1990)
- Intybia rectefasciata (Champion, 1921)
- Intybia ribbei (Pic, 1910)
- Intybia ritsemai (Pic, 1907)
- Intybia robustior (Pic, 1908)
- Intybia rotundula Wittmer, 1997
- Intybia rouyeri (Pic, 1905)
- Intybia rubrithorax (Pic, 1907)
- Intybia rubrofasciata (Pic, 1916)
- Intybia rugosiceps (Pic, 1922)
- Intybia sabahensis Wittmer, 1997
- Intybia sarawakensis (Champion, 1921)
- Intybia savioi (Pic, 1927)
- Intybia schillhammeri (Wittmer, 1996)
- Intybia schuhi (Wittmer, 1994)
- Intybia semidepressa (Pic, 1917)
- Intybia semilimbata (Pic, 1916)
- Intybia semperi (Champion, 1921)
- Intybia serandi (Pic, 1922)
- Intybia sexmaculatus (Pic, 1919)
- Intybia sexsignata (Champion, 1921)
- Intybia sikkimensis (Pic, 1914)
- Intybia sinensis (Pic)
- Intybia subcarinata (Champion, 1921)
- Intybia subcyanipennis (Pic, 1928)
- Intybia subdentata (Champion, 1921)
- Intybia sulawesiensis (Wittmer)
- Intybia sumatrensis (Wittmer)
- Intybia swatowensis (Wittmer)
- Intybia taiwana Wittmer, 1997
- Intybia takaraensis (Nakane, 1955)
- Intybia taprobana (Champion, 1921)
- Intybia testaceipes (Pic, 1911)
- Intybia tetrops (Champion, 1921)
- Intybia thai Wittmer, 1997
- Intybia thainiensis Wittmer, 1997
- Intybia timorensis (Pic, 1917)
- Intybia trinoctialis (Fairmaire, 1891)
- Intybia tsushimensis (Satô & Ohbayashi, 1968)
- Intybia ugandana (Evers, 1986)
- Intybia unimaculata (Pic, 1917)
- Intybia variolosa (Bourgeois, 1905)
- Intybia venusta (Erichson, 1840)
- Intybia viridithorax (Pic)
- Intybia waterstradti (Pic, 1910)
