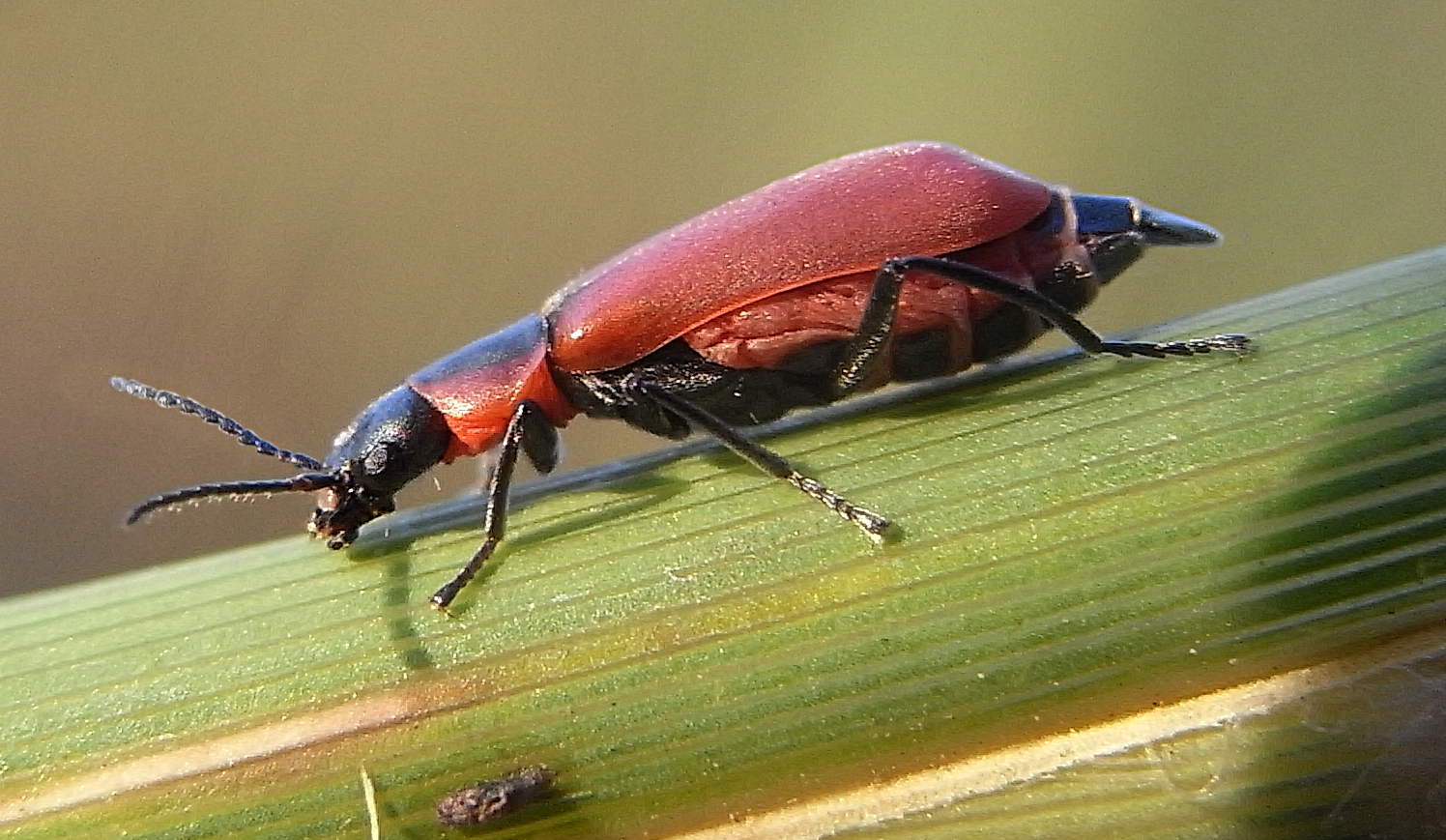
- Anthocomus rufus

Scientific classification
- Kingdom: Animalia
- Phylum: Arthropoda
- Clade: Pancrustacea
- Class: Insecta
- Order: Coleoptera
- Suborder: Polyphaga
- Infraorder: Cucujiformia
- Superfamily: Cleroidea
- Family: Melyridae; Leach, 1815

Synonyms
- Attalomimidae; Dasytidae; Malachiidae

= Melyridae =

Melyridae Temporal range: Middle Jurassic–Recent

Family of beetles

Melyridae (common name: soft-winged flower beetles) are a family of beetles of the superfamily Cleroidea.

== Description ==
Most are elongate-oval, soft-bodied beetles 10 mm long or less. Many are brightly patterned in black and brown, yellow, or red. Some melyrids (Malachiinae) have peculiar orange structures along the sides of the abdomen, which may be everted and saclike or withdrawn into the body and inconspicuous. Some melyrids have the two basal antennomeres greatly enlarged. Most adults and larvae are predaceous, but many are common on flowers. The most common North American species belong to the genus Collops (Malachiinae); C. quadrimaculatus is reddish, with two bluish black spots on each elytron.

Four New Guinean species of Choresine (the more abundant C. pulchra, the less abundant C. semiopaca and the two infrequent C. rugiceps and C. sp. A, the latter as yet unnamed) have been found to contain batrachotoxins, which may account for the toxicity of some birds such as the blue-capped ifrit and hooded pitohui which eat them. The hypothesis that Phyllobates frogs in South America obtain batrachotoxins from related genera of the Melyridae (Choresine does not occur there) has not been tested due to the difficulty of field-work in Colombia.

== Evolutionary history ==
The oldest fossil of the family are Sinomelyris and Juraniscus from the late Middle Jurassic (Callovian) Daohugou bed in Inner Mongolia, China. The oldest member of Dasytinae is Protodasytes from the early Late Cretaceous (Cenomanian) aged Charentese amber of France.

== Distribution ==
The family Melyridae contains over 100 genera worldwide, with ~520 species in 48 genera in North America, and 16 genera in Europe; the largest diversity is in dry temperate regions.

== Subfamilies ==
Various authorities have, at times, treated each of the presently-recognized subfamilies as families, and a few tribes have been accorded family status, as well (e.g., "Attalomimidae"). The family Mauroniscidae was removed from Melyridae in 1995, and Rhadalidae in 2019.

Dasytes plumbeus (Dasytinae)

- Dasytinae Laporte de Castelnau, 1840
- Malachiinae Fleming, 1821
- Melyrinae Leach, 1815

== Selected genera ==
- Ablechrus Waterhouse, 1877
- Amauronia Westwood, 1839
- Amecocerus Solier 1849
- Anthocomus Erichson, 1840
- Anthodromius Redtenbacher, 1850
- Anthomalachius Tshernyshev, 2009
- Apalochrus Erichson, 1840
- Arthrobrachus Solier, 1849
- Astylus Laporte, 1836
- Asydates Casey, 1895
- Attalus Erichson, 1840
- Attalusinus Leng, 1918
- Axinotarsus Motschulsky, 1854
- Balanophorus MacLeay, 1872
- Byturosomus Motschoulsky, 1859
- Carphuroides Champion, 1923
- Carphurus Erichson, 1840
- Cerallus Jacquelin Du Val, 1859
- Cerapheles Mulsant & Rey, 1867
- Ceratistes Fischer von Waldheim, 1844
- Chaetocoelus Leconte, 1880
- Chalchas Blanchard, 1845
- Chalicorus Erichson, 1840
- Charopus Erichson, 1840
- Clanoptilus Motschulsky, 1854
- Collops Erichson, 1840
- Colotes Erichson 1840
- Condylops Redtenbacher, 1849
- Cordylepherus Evers, 1985
- Cradytes Casey, 1895
- Cyrtosus Motschulsky, 1854
- Danacea Laporte, 1838
- Dasytastes Casey, 1895
- Dasytellus Casey, 1895
- Dasytes Casey, 1895
- Dasytidius Schilsky, 1896
- Dicranolaius Champion, 1921
- Divales Laporte de Castelnau, 1836
- Dolichophron Kiesenwetter, 1867
- Dolichosoma Stephens, 1830
- Ebaeus Erichson, 1840
- Enallonyx Wolcott, 1944
- Endeodes LeConte, 1859
- Enicopus Stephens, 1830
- Eschatocrepis Leconte, 1861
- Falsomelyris Pic, 1913
- Hadrocnemus Kraatz, 1895
- Halyles Broun, 1883
- Haplomalachius Evers, 1985
- Hoppingiana Blaisdell, 1924
- Hylodanacaea Pic, 1926
- Hypebaeus Kiesenwetter, 1863
- Intybia Pascoe, 1866
- Laius Guérin-Méneville, 1830
- Leptovectura Casey, 1895
- Listropsis Blaisdell, 1924
- Listrus Motschoulsky, 1859
- Malachius Fabricius, 1775
- Melyris Fabricius, 1775
- Melyrodes Gorham, 1882
- Microlipus Leconte, 1852
- Nepachys Thomson, 1859
- Nodopus Marshall, 1951
- Pagurodactylus Gorham, 1900
- Psilothrix Redtenbacher, 1858
- Scelopristis Mayor, 2004
- Sphinginus Mulsant & Rey, 1867
- Spinapalochrus
- Tanaops Leconte, 1859
- Temnopsophus Horn, 1872
- Trichochrous Motschulsky, 1859
- Trophimus Horn, 1870
- Vecturoides Fall, 1930
