= Red cross beetle =

Red cross beetle may refer to:

- Collops balteatus
- Collops quadrimaculatus
- Collops vittatus
