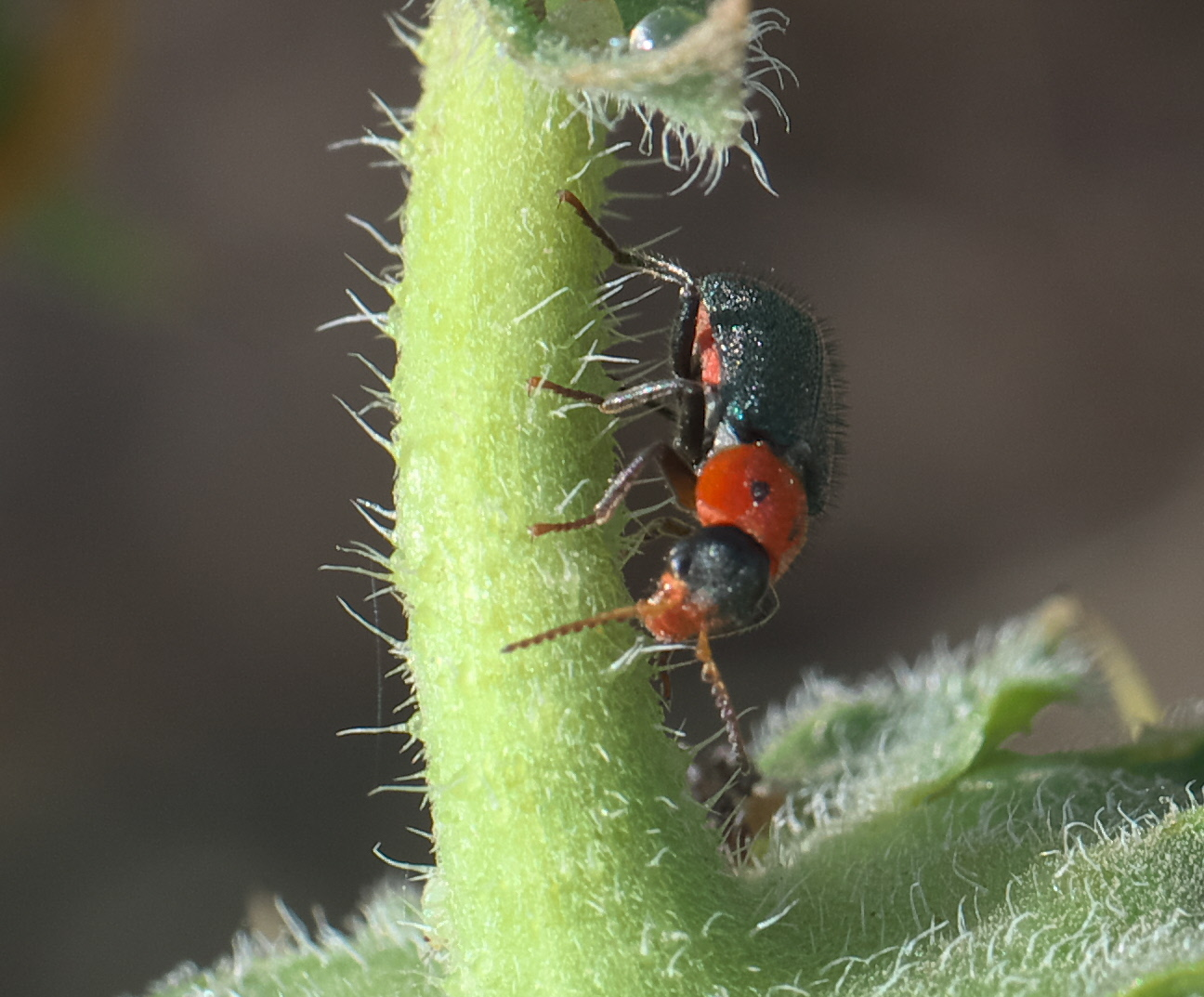
- Collops bipunctatus, two-spotted melyrid

Scientific classification
- Kingdom: Animalia
- Phylum: Arthropoda
- Clade: Pancrustacea
- Class: Insecta
- Order: Coleoptera
- Suborder: Polyphaga
- Infraorder: Cucujiformia
- Family: Melyridae
- Subfamily: Malachiinae
- Tribe: Malachiini
- Genus: Collops
- Species: C. bipunctatus

Binomial name
- Collops bipunctatus (Say, 1823)

= Collops bipunctatus =

Species of beetle

Collops bipunctatus, also known as the two-spotted melyrid or two-spotted flower beetle, is a species of soft-winged flower beetle in the family Melyridae. It is found mainly in North America.

== Behavior ==
Members of this species are primarily insectivores, predating aphids, caterpillars, insect eggs, and spider mites. However, they have also been known to consume pollen as adults. They are active in the summer and overwinter as adults.

== Identification ==
This species has several distinctive traits which can help to identify a specimen. These include:

- Dark green head
- Metallic greenish-blue to black forewings
- Red to orange pronotum with two black spots
- Body widest towards end of abdomen
- Roughly 7mm (¼ inch) long
- Abdomen longer than elytra
- Second pair of wings under elytra
- Slender legs
- Saw-toothed antennae (with an enlarged base in adult males)
