= Ceratistes =

Ceratistes may refer to:

- a synonym for Eriosyce, plant genus
- Ceratistes (beetle), a genus of beetle in the subfamily Malachiinae
