= Carphurus elegans =

Scientific classification
- Kingdom: Animalia
- Phylum: Arthropoda
- Clade: Pancrustacea
- Class: Insecta
- Order: Coleoptera
- Suborder: Polyphaga
- Infraorder: Cucujiformia
- Family: Melyridae
- Genus: Carphurus
- Species: C. elegans

Binomial name
- Carphurus elegans Lea, 1909

Species of beetle

Carphurus elegans is a species of soft-winged flower beetle (beetles of the family Melyridae) in the subfamily Malachiinae and tribe Carphurini. It is found in Queensland, Australia.
