= Collops tricolor =

Scientific classification
- Kingdom: Animalia
- Phylum: Arthropoda
- Clade: Pancrustacea
- Class: Insecta
- Order: Coleoptera
- Suborder: Polyphaga
- Infraorder: Cucujiformia
- Family: Melyridae
- Subfamily: Malachiinae
- Tribe: Malachiini
- Genus: Collops
- Species: C. tricolor

Binomial name
- Collops tricolor (Say, 1823)

Synonyms(Schaeffer/Fall, 1912)
- Collops sublimbatus

Species of beetle

Collops tricolor, also known as the black-headed melyrid or the tri-colored soft-winged flower beetle, is a species of soft-winged flower beetle in the family Melyridae. It is found in North America.

== Description ==
Adults measure 3.5-4mm in length. Head, undersides, and legs are black. Labrum and polished thorax are rufous while the antennae are pale rufous becoming dusky at the tips. Dark bluish-green to violet elytra, with the margins sometimes rufous in the middle and the suture less often partly rufous.

=== Male ===
Elytra are shiny. The basal joints of the antennae are triangular and broad, being virtually equal in width and length.

=== Female ===
Elytra are duller. Further west, the female type is virtually indistinguishable from other species (e.g., C. vicarius) without an associating male.

=== Plausible polymorphism ===
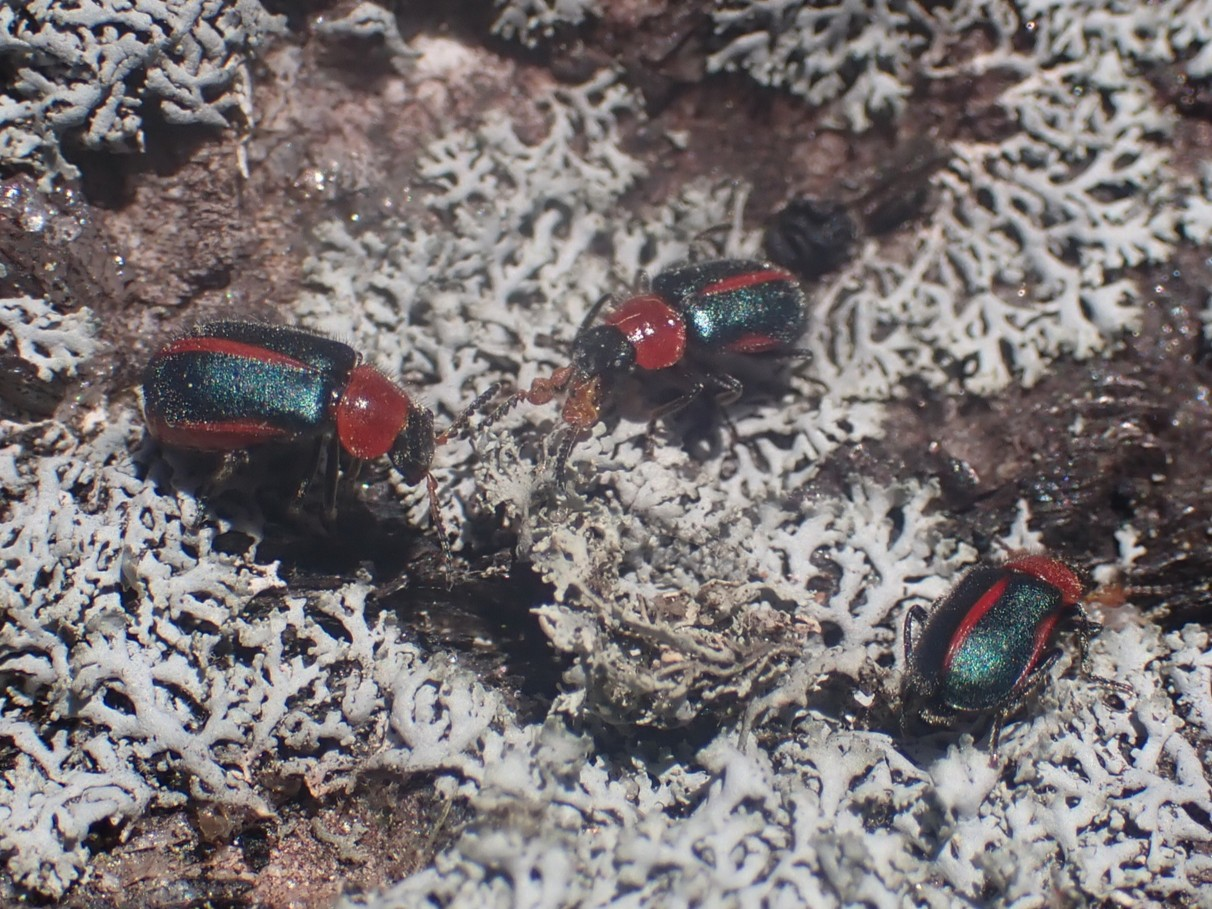
Collops sublimbatus on outcrop - female (left) and males (right)

Collops sublimbatus was described as its own species by Schaeffer in 1912 from specimens collected near the top of Black Rock Mountain in Rabun County, Georgia. It is virtually the same as C. tricolor, except that the elytral margins and suture are always entirely rufous. Fall indicates that this "species" is a probable variety or color phase of C. tricolor, by the fact that some C. tricolor specimens have varying amounts of rufous on the margins and suture and thus "bridge the gap" between the two types. Accordingly, a 1987 study done between C. sublimbatus and C. georgianus in the southeast referred to sublimbatus as a type of the species C. tricolor. Nomina Insecta Nearctica (1996) lists C. sublimbatus as a synonym of C. tricolor.

== Similar species ==
C. vicarius is indistingishable from C. tricolor, except that the basal triangular joint of the male's antennae is not as broad, but is 1/2 longer than wide. However, Henry Fall, who described the species in 1912 from a specimen from Indiana, noted that more study is needed to distinguish these species.

C. nigriceps, found along the coastlines of the Atlantic and Gulf Coast, from Massachusetts to Alabama, is similar to C. tricolor, but is distinguished by a large dark spot on the rufous thorax, a longer thorax proportionally, and the thighs sometimes being rufous. However, the spot is often absent in the floridanus variety, and thus, it is more reliably separated by the male's third antennal joint.

C. parvus is superficially similar in color but smaller (3mm) and narrower towards the front since the thorax is half as wide as the elytra. The antennae and legs are also different; it has black thighs and rufous tibiae and tarsi. Moreover, it inhabits parts of the Southwestern United States.

C. georgianus can be confused with C. sublimbatus type, but the head and prothorax of the latter are shiny and hardly punctuate, and the head, legs, and undersides are black. The antennae between these species are almost indistinguishably the same.

== Distribution ==
Locally common from Quebec to Virginia becoming scarcer to the west of this region. The range of the C. sublimbatus type includes Alabama, North and South Carolina, and the Appalachian Mountains in Georgia, with C. georgianus occupying outcrops in the north central part of Georgia.
