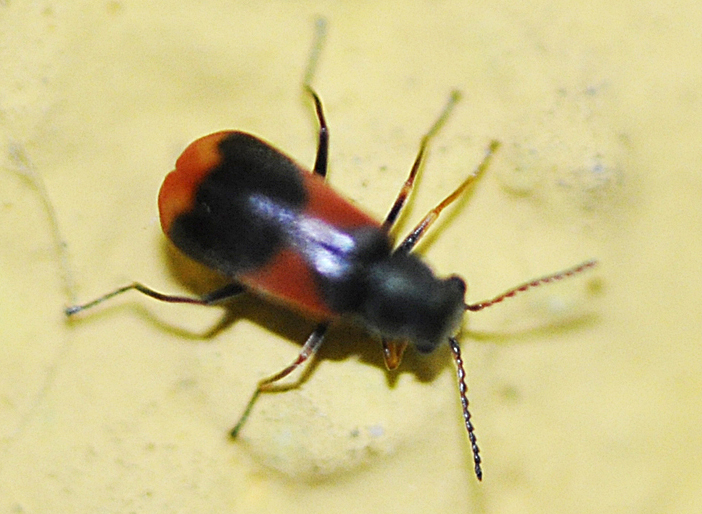

Scientific classification
- Kingdom: Animalia
- Phylum: Arthropoda
- Class: Insecta
- Order: Coleoptera
- Suborder: Polyphaga
- Infraorder: Cucujiformia
- Family: Melyridae
- Subfamily: Malachiinae
- Tribe: Malachiini
- Genus: Anthocomus
- Species: A. equestris

Binomial name
- Anthocomus equestris (Fabricius, 1781)

Synonyms
- Malachius bipunctatus Harrer, 1784

= Anthocomus equestris =

Species of beetle

Anthocomus equestris is a species of soft-winged flower beetle in the family Melyridae. It is native to Eurasia, but also found in the eastern half of the United States.
