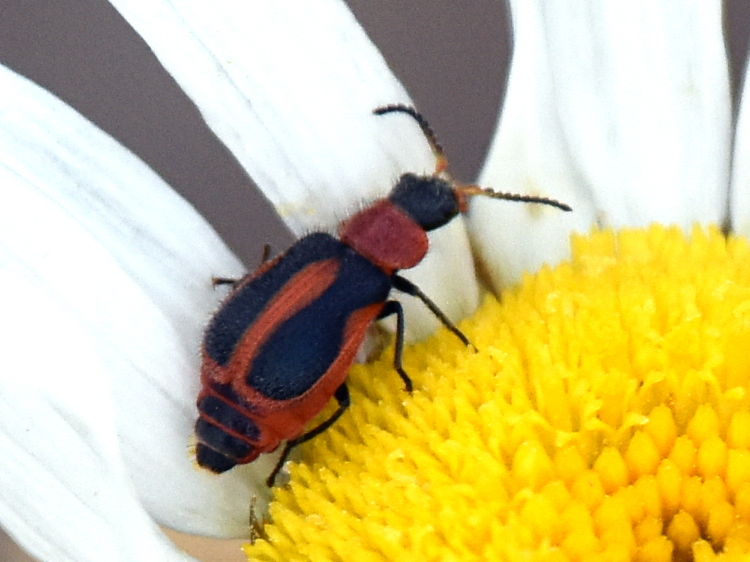
- Collops vittatus, melyrid beetle, Canada

Scientific classification
- Kingdom: Animalia
- Phylum: Arthropoda
- Clade: Pancrustacea
- Class: Insecta
- Order: Coleoptera
- Suborder: Polyphaga
- Infraorder: Cucujiformia
- Family: Melyridae
- Subfamily: Malachiinae
- Tribe: Malachiini
- Genus: Collops
- Species: C. vittatus

Binomial name
- Collops vittatus (Say, 1823)

= Collops vittatus =

Species of beetle

Collops vittatus, the melyrid beetle, is a species of soft-winged flower beetle in the family Melyridae. It is found in North and Central America.

== Description ==
Adults measure about 5mm in length. They have a black head with rufous labrum and antennal base, a rufous thorax with a central black spot formed from two merged spots that do not reach the front margin, and greenish-blue elytra with pale rufous suture, margins and tips that are always continuous. On the underside, the prosternum is rufous, the postpectus is black, the abdomen is black with testaceous (dull brick-red color) edging at the segmental lines, and the legs are mostly black with brownish frontal tibiae.

The form, shape, and color of this species is variable depending on geographic region. The spot on the thorax may be large, small, divided, or absent. However, the pale margins on the elytra are fairly consistent. Specimens from the northeastern U.S. tend to be smaller, shiny, with coarser punctuation, darker antennae, and almost entirely black legs. In contrast, southwestern specimens are larger, less shiny and more dull, more finely punctured, with pale antennae and mostly pale legs. Intermediate forms are found in the Dakotas, Montana, Colorado, Texas, and Arizona, making clear-cut varieties nearly impossible to define.

Males are distinguished by their second segment of the antennae being enlargened and irregular. The first antennal segment is somewhat triangular, about one-third longer than wide, not indented at the back, and flattened in front; the second segment is narrower than usual, as long as wide, with a short appendage.

== Distribution ==
In North America, it is found in the southwest United States and up to Canada from Saskatchewan to Quebec and south to the northeastern United States, though not always continuous and common throughout this range.
