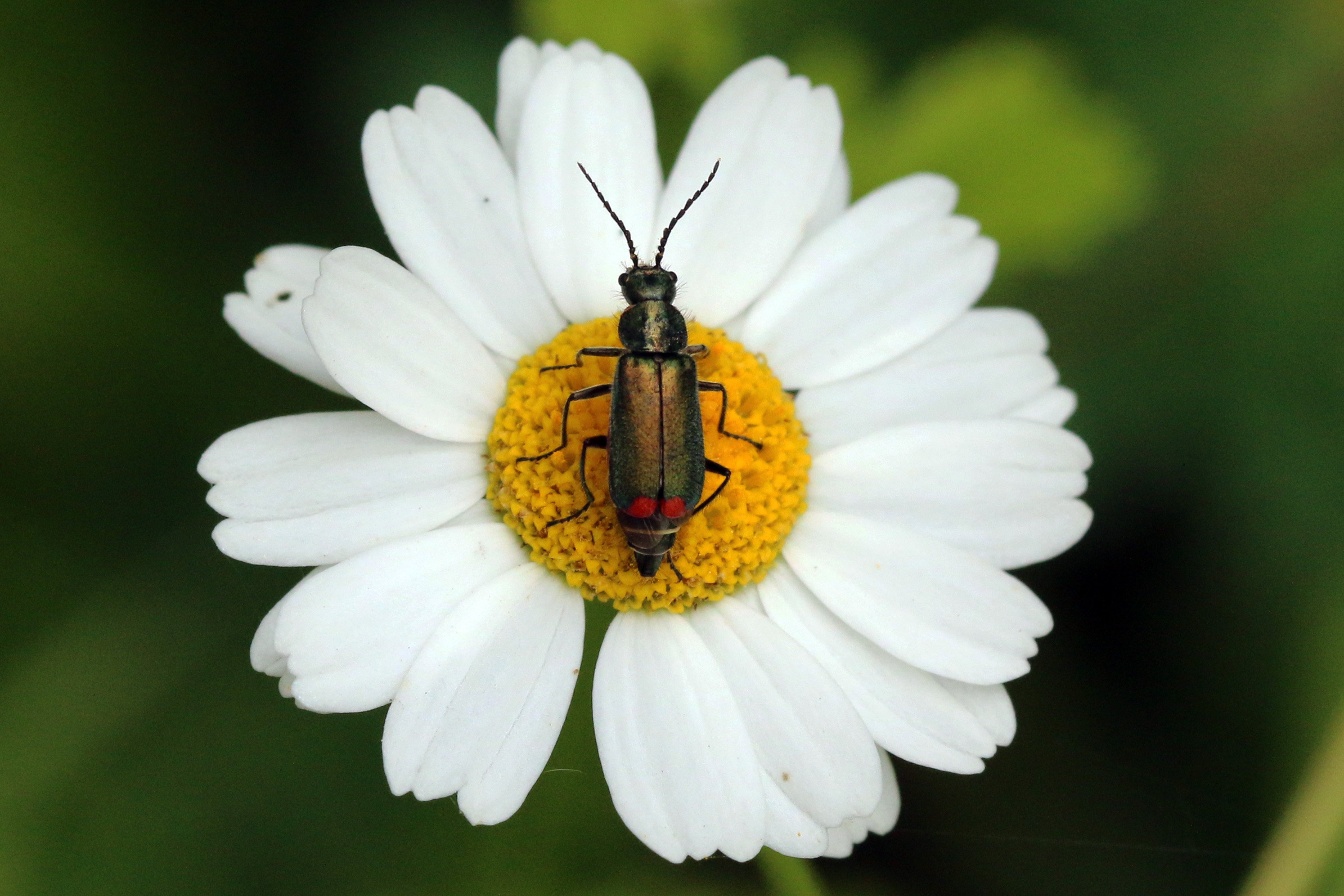

Scientific classification
- Kingdom: Animalia
- Phylum: Arthropoda
- Class: Insecta
- Order: Coleoptera
- Suborder: Polyphaga
- Infraorder: Cucujiformia
- Family: Melyridae
- Genus: Malachius
- Species: M. bipustulatus

Binomial name
- Malachius bipustulatus (Linnaeus, 1758)

= Malachius bipustulatus =

Species of beetle

Malachius bipustulatus, the malachite beetle, is a species of soft-winged flower beetles belonging to the family Melyridae, subfamily Malachiinae.

The body is 5–7 millimetres (0.20–0.28 in) long, the head and pronotum are brownish, while elytrae are shining metallic green with a bright red spot at the end. Along the sides of the abdomen this species has a peculiar structure with orange pouches.

These beetles mainly inhabit meadows at low altitudes. During the day they stay on herbs and flowers, including flowers of garden plants, mainly on Apiaceae, Asteraceae and Rosaceae species, where they feed on pollen, nectar and small insects.

In case of necessity, this beetle can release a smell that deters predators. The males attract females producing special secretions from its antennae.

Malachius bipustulatus is an insect with a complete metamorphism, (or holometabolism), with four life stages (egg, larva, pupa and imago or adult). The pupal stage is a period of rest, when inner and outer bodies change.

The larvae and the adults largely differ in physique and lifestyle. The larvae usually live under bark, in old wood or on the ground in grass roots, hunting small insects, larvae and slugs.

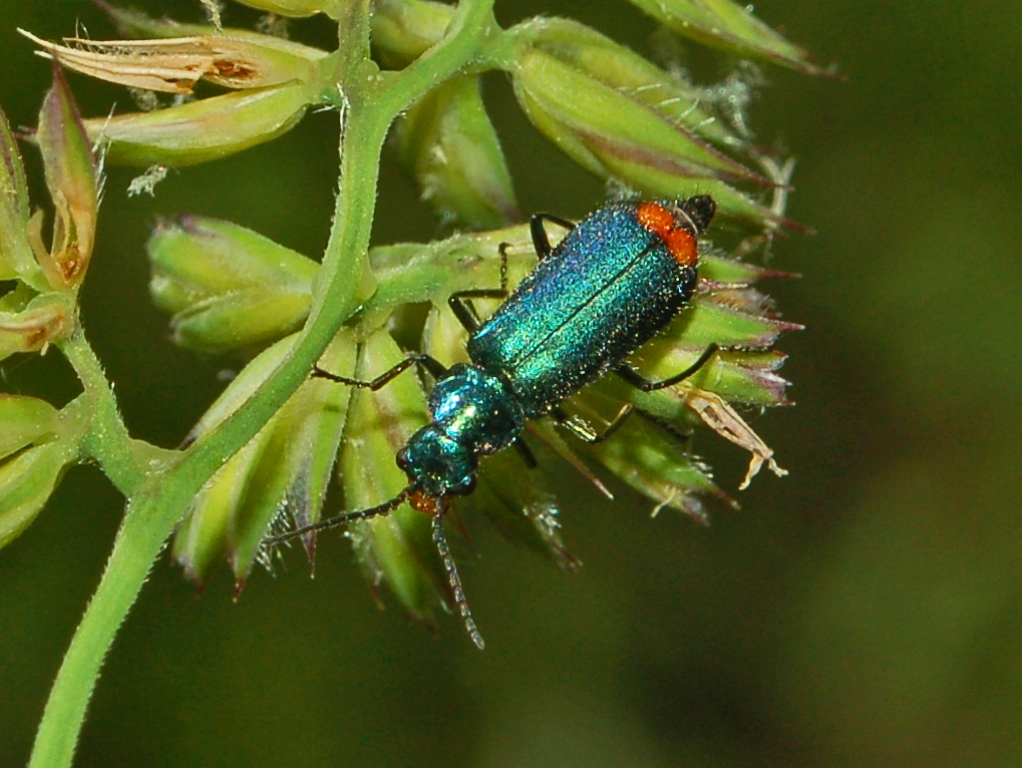

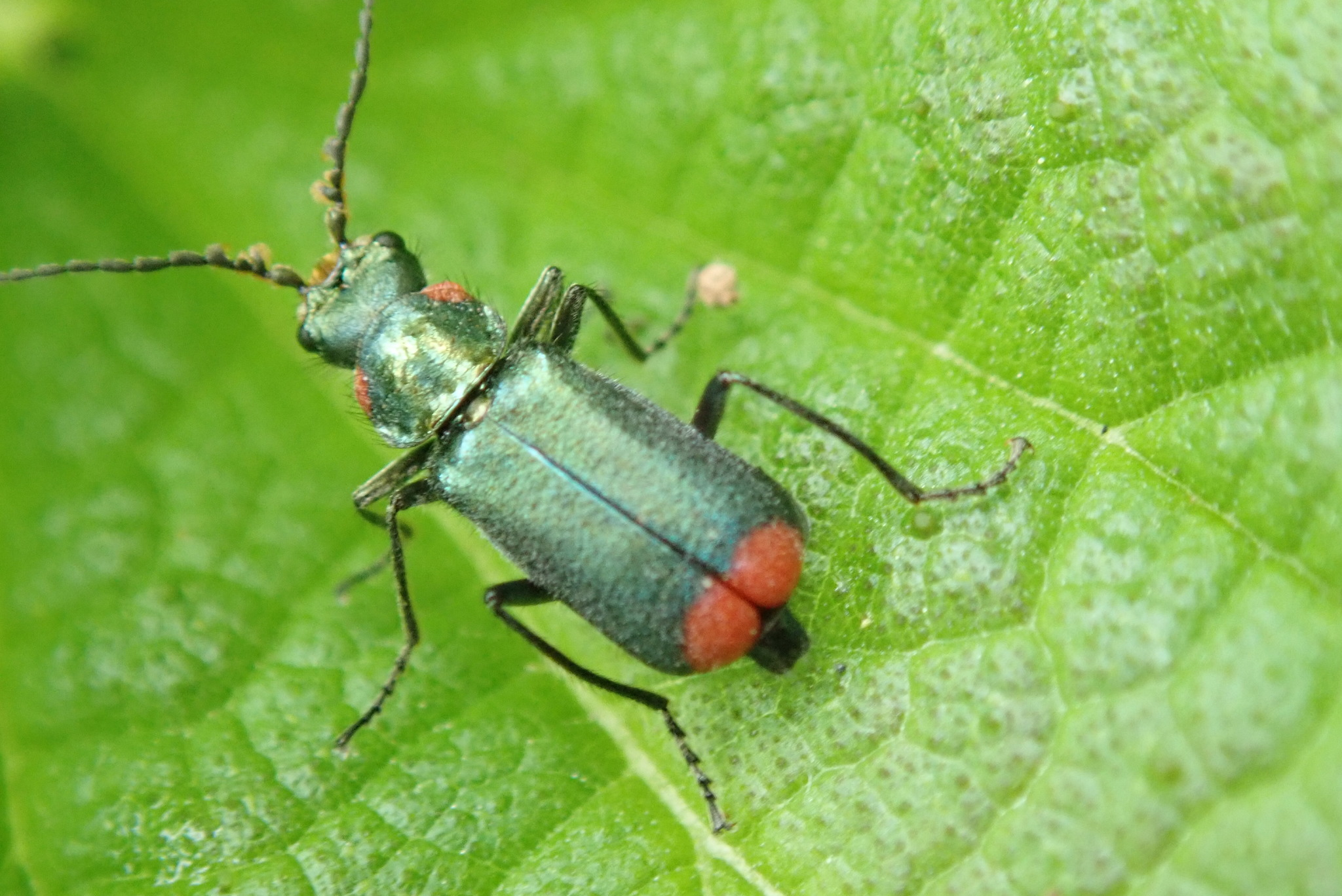

== Subspecies ==
- Malachius bipustulatus var. immaculatus Rey
