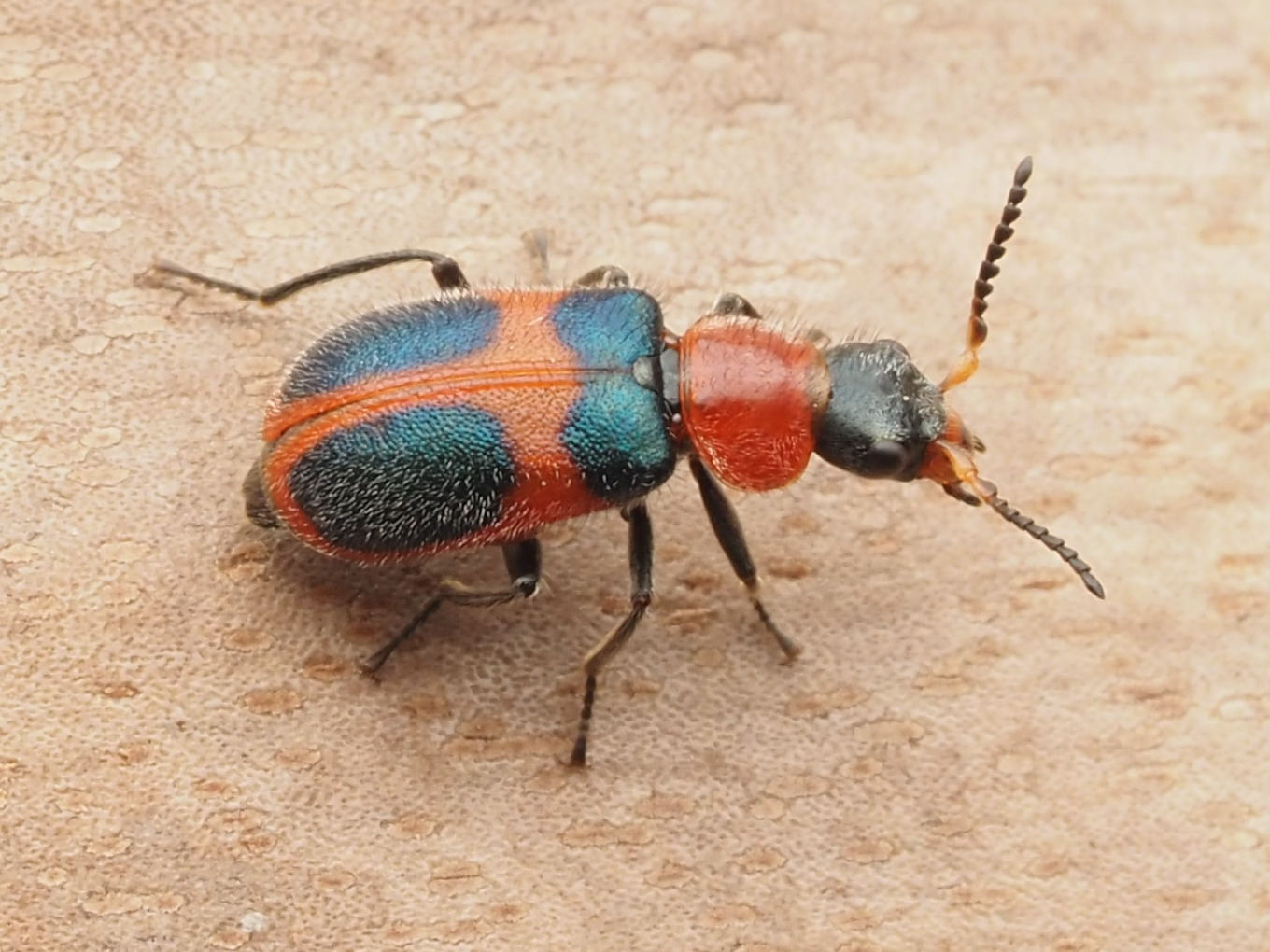

Scientific classification
- Kingdom: Animalia
- Phylum: Arthropoda
- Clade: Pancrustacea
- Class: Insecta
- Order: Coleoptera
- Suborder: Polyphaga
- Infraorder: Cucujiformia
- Family: Melyridae
- Subfamily: Malachiinae
- Tribe: Malachiini
- Genus: Collops
- Species: C. quadrimaculatus

Binomial name
- Collops quadrimaculatus (Fabricius, 1798)

= Collops quadrimaculatus =

Species of beetle

Collops quadrimaculatus, the four-spotted collops, is a species of soft-winged flower beetle in the family Melyridae. It is found in Central and North America.
