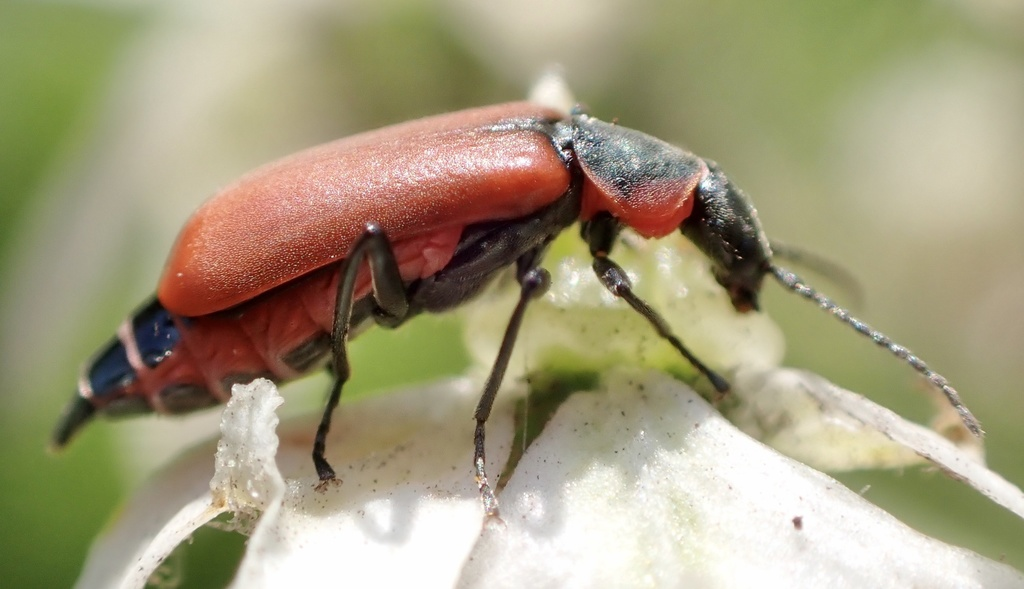

Scientific classification
- Kingdom: Animalia
- Phylum: Arthropoda
- Clade: Pancrustacea
- Class: Insecta
- Order: Coleoptera
- Suborder: Polyphaga
- Infraorder: Cucujiformia
- Family: Melyridae
- Genus: Anthocomus
- Species: A. rufus

Binomial name
- Anthocomus rufus (Herbst, 1784)

= Anthocomus rufus =

Species of beetle

Anthocomus rufus is a species of beetle belonging to the family Melyridae. It is commonly known as the red malachite beetle.

It is native to Europe. The elongated body has a lightly sclerotized outer skeleton. It is sparsely hairy and reaches an average length of just under five millimeters.

The elongate black head is slightly tilted downward. The mouthparts point forward. The mandibles have a two-toothed tip. The thread-like maxillary palps have three segments, with the terminal segment spindle-shaped and ending in a point. The labial palps are short, with the second and third segments being the same length. The eleven-segmented antennae are thread-like, originating in front of the eyes, not between them.

The pronotum is wider than it is long. The base has a fine edge and tapers to a rounded shape. It is black with red on the sides, or red with a broad black middle stripe. The red and black colours are not sharply defined but flow smoothly into each other. The elytra only partially cover the abdomen in females. They are only slightly wider than the pronotum. The frequently occurring double hair within the family is absent: the elytra are only softly hairy in a downy way. They are the same red as the edges of the pronotum. Around the scutellum, there is usually a blurry black spot. In females, the elytra are slightly widened at the back, while in males, they are almost parallel. At the tip of the elytra in males, there is a striking structure called the excitator. It consists of a black, intricately curved chitin ridge that resembles a musical note. The animals are active during the day and love the sun and warmth. The beetles eat pollen from the reed (Phragmites communis). They also consume dead insects, preferably prey of the reed spider. The beetles are often found in large numbers on their host plant and mate there as well. Mating is usually preceded by a so-called tasting courtship (gustatory courtship), as is only seen in the longhorn beetles.
