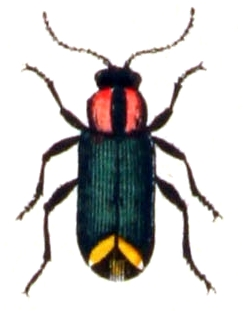
- A. pulicarius

Scientific classification
- Kingdom: Animalia
- Phylum: Arthropoda
- Class: Insecta
- Order: Coleoptera
- Suborder: Polyphaga
- Infraorder: Cucujiformia
- Family: Melyridae
- Subfamily: Malachiinae
- Tribe: Malachiini
- Genus: Axinotarsus; Motschulsky, 1854

Species
- see text

= Axinotarsus =

Genus of beetles

Axinotarsus is a genus of beetles of the subfamily Malachiinae.

== Species ==
- Axinotarsus brevicornis
- Axinotarsus doderoi
- Axinotarsus insularis
- Axinotarsus italicus
- Axinotarsus longicornis
- Axinotarsus marginalis
- Axinotarsus nigritarsis
- Axinotarsus peninsularis
- Axinotarsus pulicarius
- Axinotarsus ruficollis
- Axinotarsus siciliensis
- Axinotarsus tristiculus
- Axinotarsus tristis
- Axinotarsus varius
