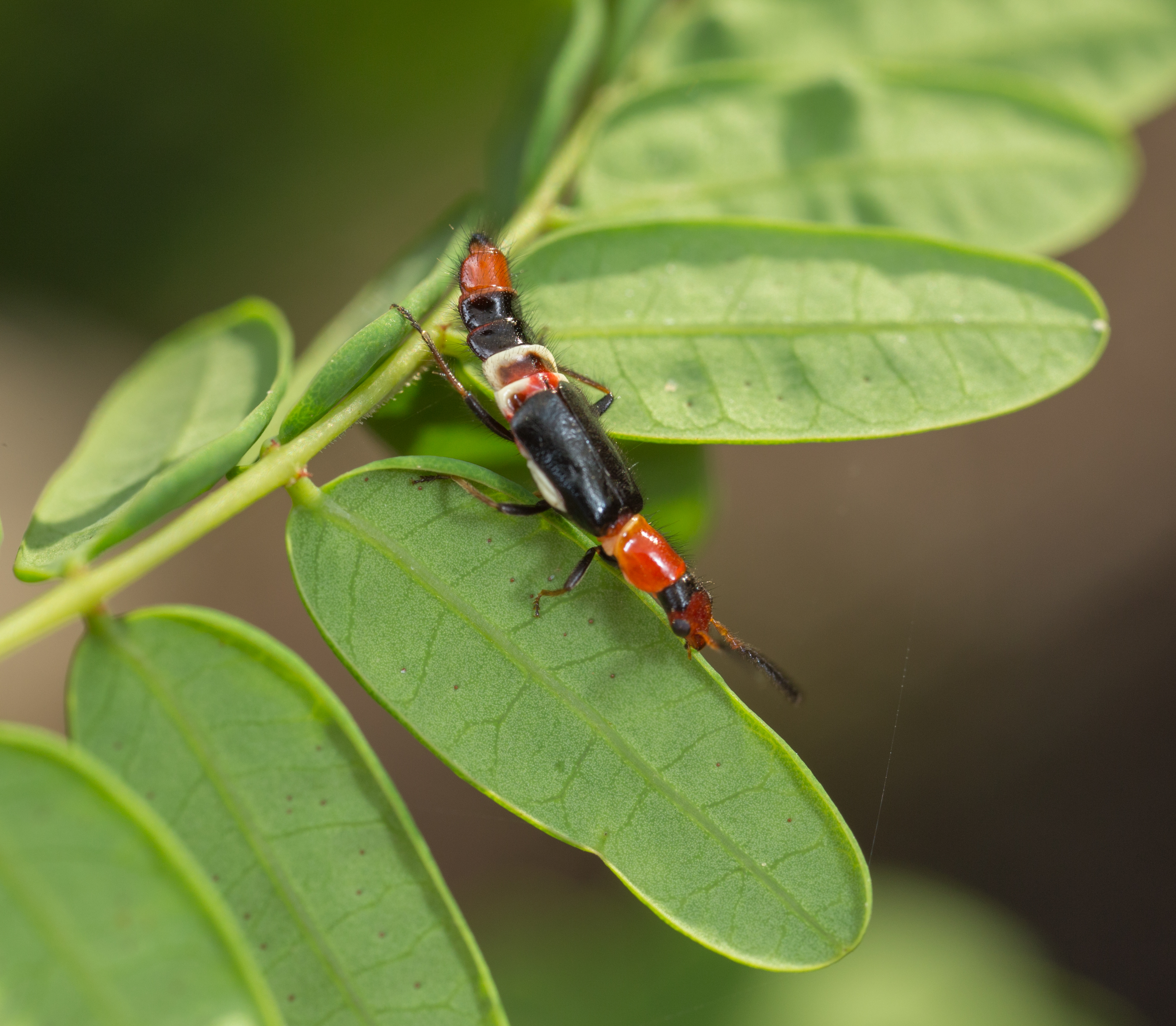
- Carphurus sp.

Scientific classification
- Kingdom: Animalia
- Phylum: Arthropoda
- Class: Insecta
- Order: Coleoptera
- Suborder: Polyphaga
- Infraorder: Cucujiformia
- Family: Melyridae
- Subfamily: Malachiinae
- Tribe: Carphurini
- Genus: Carphurus; Erichson, 1840

Species
- many, including: Carphurus dumogaensis; Carphurus elegans; Carphurus malaccanus; Carphurus rubroannulatus; Carphurus venustus

= Carphurus =

Genus of beetles

Carphurus is a genus of soft-wing flower beetles (beetles of the family Melyridae) in the subfamily Malachiinae and tribe Carphurini. Species are found mainly in Australia, and in Papua-New Guinea.
