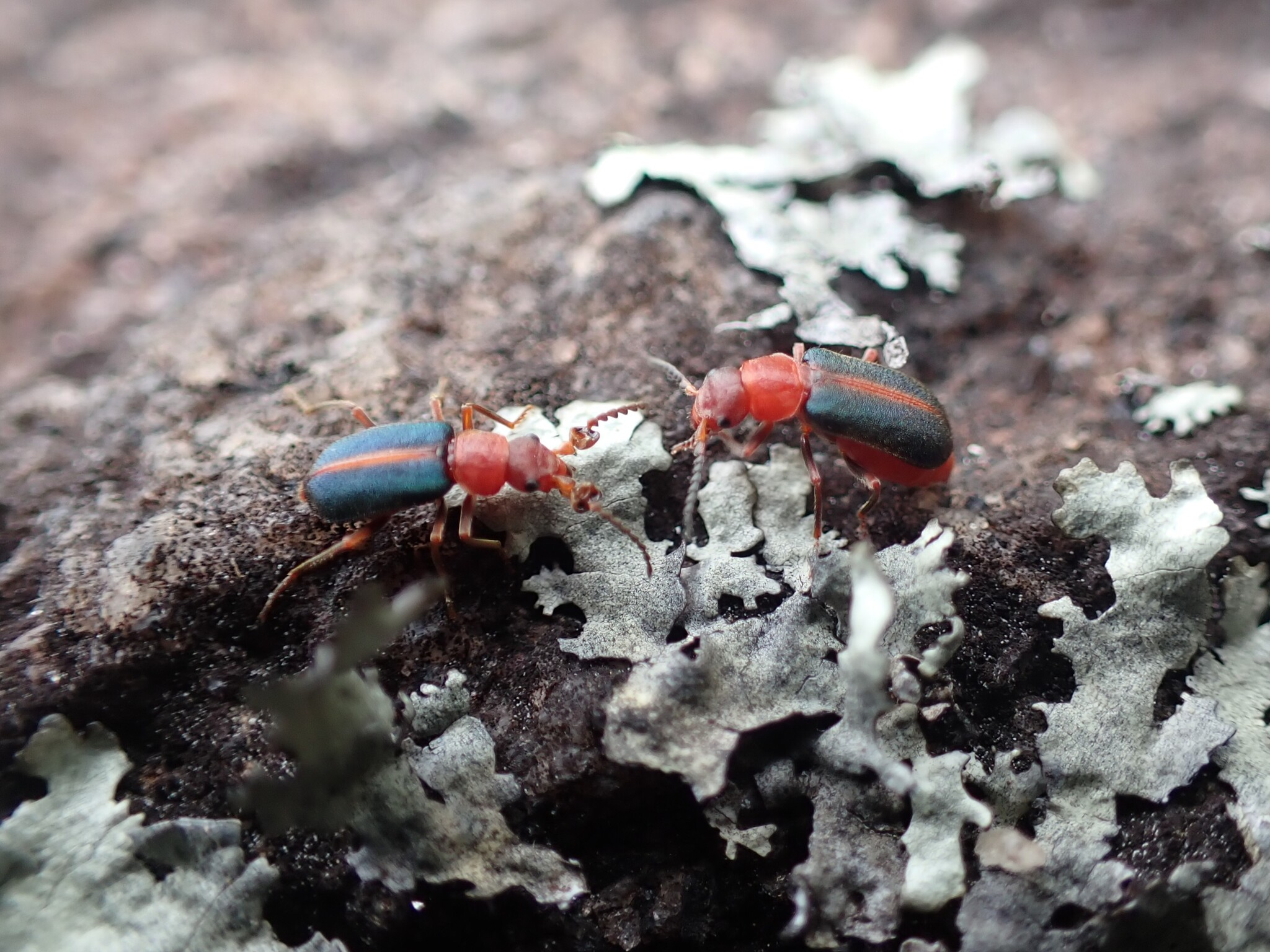

Scientific classification
- Kingdom: Animalia
- Phylum: Arthropoda
- Clade: Pancrustacea
- Class: Insecta
- Order: Coleoptera
- Suborder: Polyphaga
- Infraorder: Cucujiformia
- Family: Melyridae
- Genus: Collops
- Species: C. georgianus

Binomial name
- Collops georgianus (Henry C. Fall, 1910)

= Collops georgianus =

Species of beetle

Collops georgianus, also known as the Georgia rock outcrop beetle, is a species of soft-winged flower beetle endemic to rock outcrops in Georgia.

== Description ==
Adults measure 4 - 4.5 mm in length with distinctive coloration, including chrome orange antennae, head, pronota, legs, undersides, and sack-like structures along the sides that protrude when disturbed, along with dark greenish-black elytra that have a narrow chrome orange suture. The pale orange-red color on the head, legs, and underside makes this species unique. The head and elytra are finely textured and densely dotted with tiny pits, giving them a dull appearance. The beetle is covered with two types of fine pubescent hairs: tiny pale ones that lie flat and curve backward, and fewer, short black ones that stand upright.

=== Male ===
Antennae are made up of several segments: the first basal joint is broad and triangular, the next are shorter and wider, and the middle ones nearly square, while the later segments become longer and slender. The antennae are moderately serrated overall. Like other Collops species, the third segment of the male's antennae are swollen and used for mating. The anterior segment of the thorax is slightly wider than long, with mostly straight sides.

=== Female ===
The antennae is slender and simple and the anterior segment of the thorax is more rounded at the sides. Females are also larger than males.

=== Larvae ===
Like other species in this genus, the larvae have a light maroon body, darker at the thorax, and a burnt umber head capsule and tail end (urogomphi), and they become chrome orange at the pupae stage.

== Life cyle ==
Females lay several clutches of chrome orange eggs in the summer, especially in September, and the larvae pupate in the spring, becoming adults in May and June. Unlike other Collops species, C. georginaus has a single generation per year, with adults dying in late fall and larvae overwintering. Females consistently outnumber males, which may be an adaptation to compensate for potentially low juvenile survivorship. Human development and invasion by fire ants have a drastic effect on this species by causing population extinctions.

== Diet and behavior ==
The adults are primarily predatory but they also scavenge for dead arthropods and consume plant matter. Their diet includes insects, oribatid mites, seeds (particularly from Diamorpha smalli), pollen, and organic debris. This species is diurnal, with peak activity in the late afternoon. During hot days around midday, they usually sit on dead herbaceous debris, about 30 cm from the lichen covered strata.

== Distribution and habitat ==
This species is endemic to rock outcrops that are distributed in patches in Georgia, mostly east of the Chattahoochee River and west of the Savannah River, including a lithonia gneiss outcrop in Walnut Grove, the granite outcropping of Panola Mountain, Heggie's Rock, and the migmatite outcropping of Arabia Mountain. This species is replaced on either side of this region, including Alabama, North and South Carolina, and the Appalachian Mountains in Georgia, by C. tricolor (sublimbatus type, which has rufous elytral margins), a similar and closely related species. Like C. tricolor (sublimbatus), this species inhabits outcrop island communities. C. georgianus has not been observed in habitats adjacent to the outcrops.
