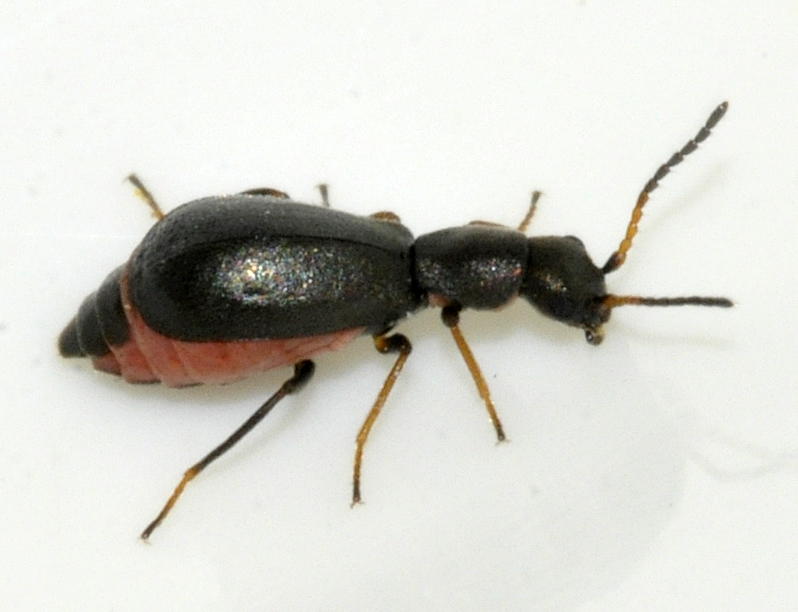
- Charopus flavipes

Scientific classification
- Kingdom: Animalia
- Phylum: Arthropoda
- Class: Insecta
- Order: Coleoptera
- Suborder: Polyphaga
- Infraorder: Cucujiformia
- Family: Melyridae
- Subfamily: Malachiinae
- Tribe: Malachiini
- Subtribe: Ebaeina
- Genus: Charopus; Erichson, 1840

= Charopus (beetle) =

Genus of beetles

Charopus is a genus of beetles belonging to the family Melyridae.

== Species ==
The following species are recognised in the genus Charopus:

- Charopus apicalis Kiesenwetter, 1859
- Charopus concolor (Fabricius, 1801)
- Charopus docilis Kiesenwetter, 1851
- Charopus flavipes (Paykull, 1798)
- Charopus madidus Kiesenwetter, 1863
- Charopus nubilus Hodgson & Plata, 1987
- Charopus pallipes (Olivier, 1790)
- Charopus philoctetes Abeille, 1885
- Charopus rotundatus Erichson, 1840
- Charopus spec Abeille de Perrin, 1885
- Charopus thoracicus Morawitz, 1861
