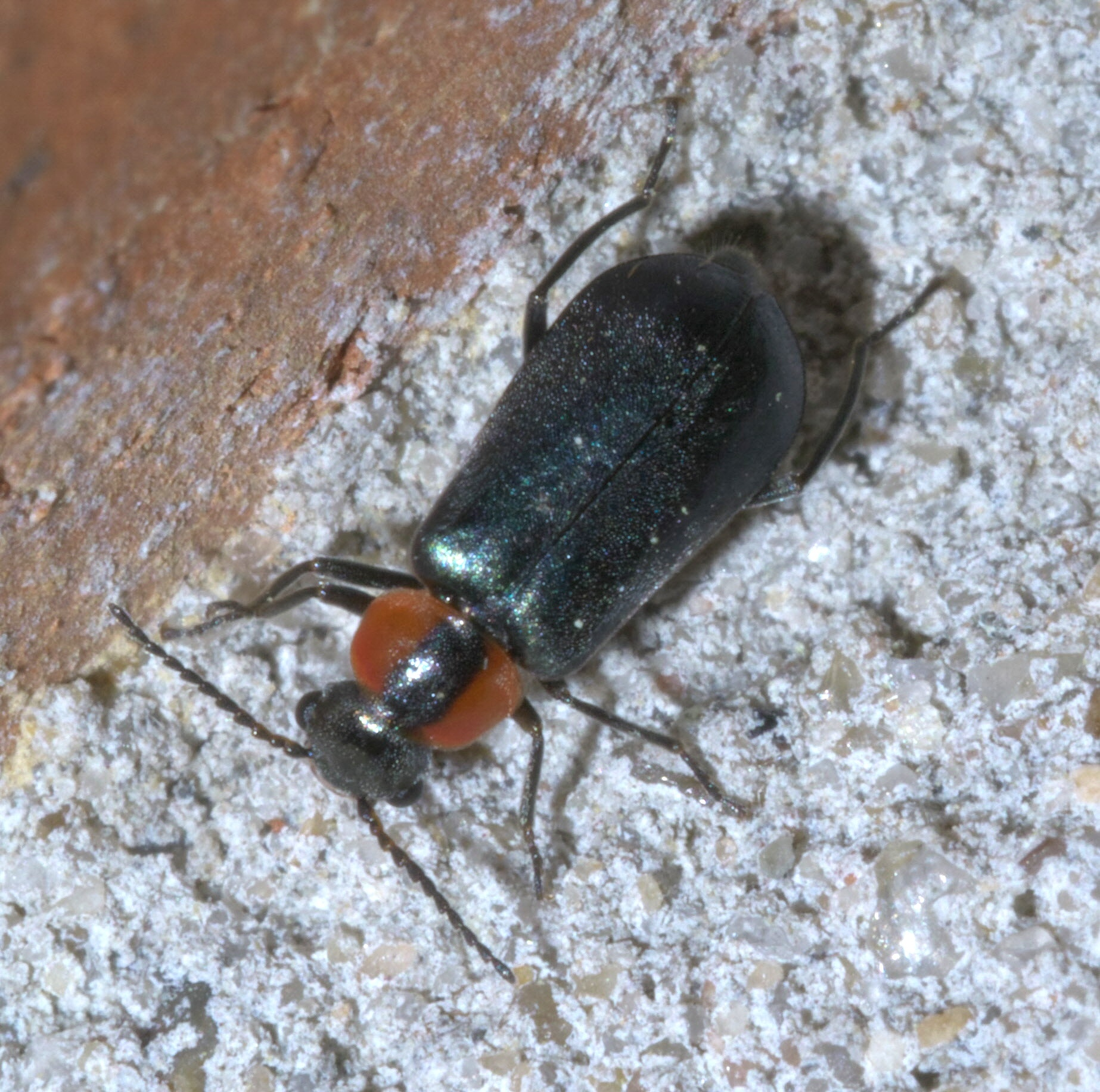
- Nodopus, Oklahoma

Scientific classification
- Domain: Eukaryota
- Kingdom: Animalia
- Phylum: Arthropoda
- Class: Insecta
- Order: Coleoptera
- Suborder: Polyphaga
- Infraorder: Cucujiformia
- Family: Melyridae
- Subfamily: Malachiinae
- Tribe: Malachiini
- Subtribe: Ilopina
- Genus: Nodopus; Marshall, 1951

= Nodopus =

Genus of beetles

Nodopus is a genus of soft-winged flower beetles in the family Melyridae. There are at least three described species in Nodopus.

== Species ==
These three species belong to the genus Nodopus:

- Nodopus caviceps
- Nodopus erichsonii (LeConte, 1852)
- Nodopus flavilabris (Say, 1825)
