= Ebaeus =

Scientific classification
- Kingdom: Animalia
- Phylum: Arthropoda
- Class: Insecta
- Order: Coleoptera
- Suborder: Polyphaga
- Infraorder: Cucujiformia
- Family: Melyridae
- Subfamily: Malachiinae
- Tribe: Malachiini
- Subtribe: Ebaeina
- Genus: Ebaeus; Erichson, 1840

Genus of beetles

Ebaeus is a genus of beetles belonging to the family Melyridae.

Species:

- Ebaeus abietinus Abeille 1869
- Ebaeus appendiculatus Erichson 1840
- Ebaeus ater Kiesenwetter 1863
