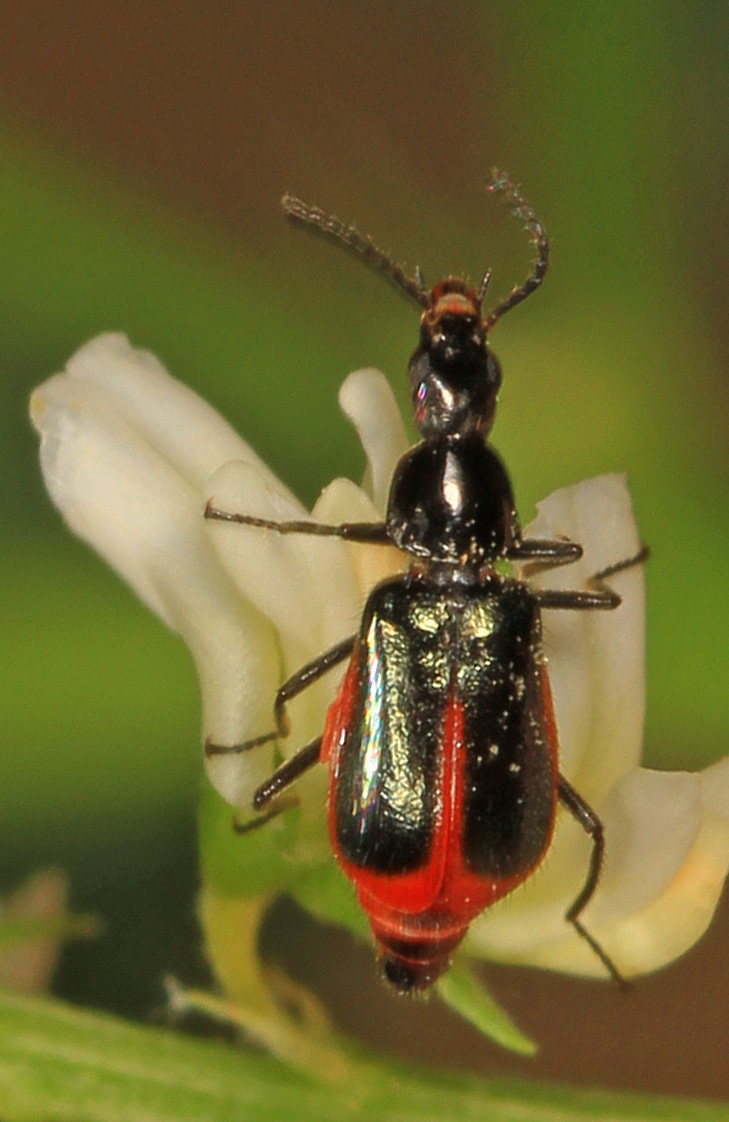
- Tanaops, California

Scientific classification
- Kingdom: Animalia
- Phylum: Arthropoda
- Class: Insecta
- Order: Coleoptera
- Suborder: Polyphaga
- Infraorder: Cucujiformia
- Family: Melyridae
- Subfamily: Malachiinae
- Tribe: Malachiini
- Subtribe: Attalina
- Genus: Tanaops; Leconte, 1859

= Tanaops =

Genus of beetles

Tanaops is a genus of soft-winged flower beetles in the family Melyridae. There are about 25 described species in Tanaops, found in the Americas.

== Species ==
These 25 species belong to the genus Tanaops:

- Tanaops abdominalis LeConte 1859
- Tanaops angusticeps Fall 1917
- Tanaops antennatus Fall 1917
- Tanaops arizonensis Evers 1993
- Tanaops basalis Brown 1928
- Tanaops coelestinus (Gorham 1886)
- Tanaops complex Fall 1917
- Tanaops dubitans Fall 1917
- Tanaops foveiventris (Fall 1917)
- Tanaops greeni Marshall 1944
- Tanaops ignitus Fall 1917
- Tanaops intermedius (Marshall1953)
- Tanaops lobulatus Marshall 1955
- Tanaops longiceps (LeConte 1852)
- Tanaops malkini Marshall 1953
- Tanaops mimus Fall 1917
- Tanaops nunenmacheri Marshall 1946
- Tanaops oregonensis Marshall 1946
- Tanaops repens Fall 1917
- Tanaops santarosae (Marshall 1951)
- Tanaops sexualis Marshall 1954
- Tanaops sierrae Marshall 1946
- Tanaops spinifer Fall 1917
- Tanaops terminalis Fall 1917
- Tanaops testaceus Marshall 1937
