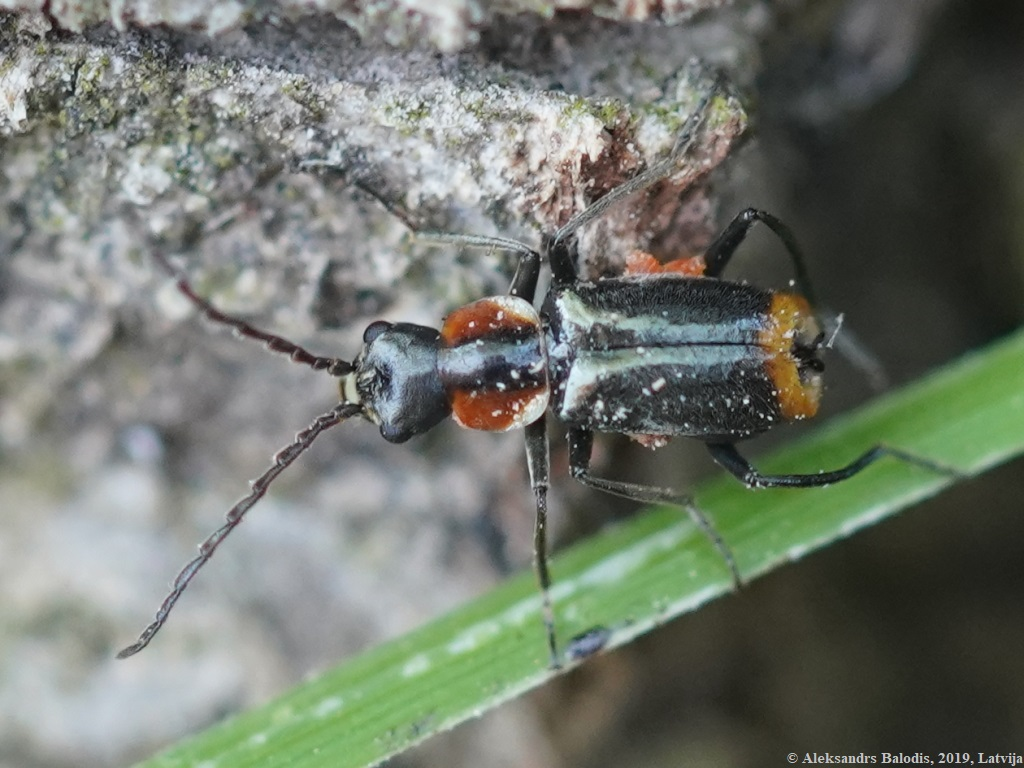

Scientific classification
- Kingdom: Animalia
- Phylum: Arthropoda
- Clade: Pancrustacea
- Class: Insecta
- Order: Coleoptera
- Suborder: Polyphaga
- Infraorder: Cucujiformia
- Family: Melyridae
- Genus: Axinotarsus
- Species: A. pulicarius

Binomial name
- Axinotarsus pulicarius Fabricius, 1775

= Axinotarsus pulicarius =

Species of beetle

Axinotarsus pulicarius is a species of soft-winged flower beetle that is native to Europe, but has also been introduced to North America.

== Description ==
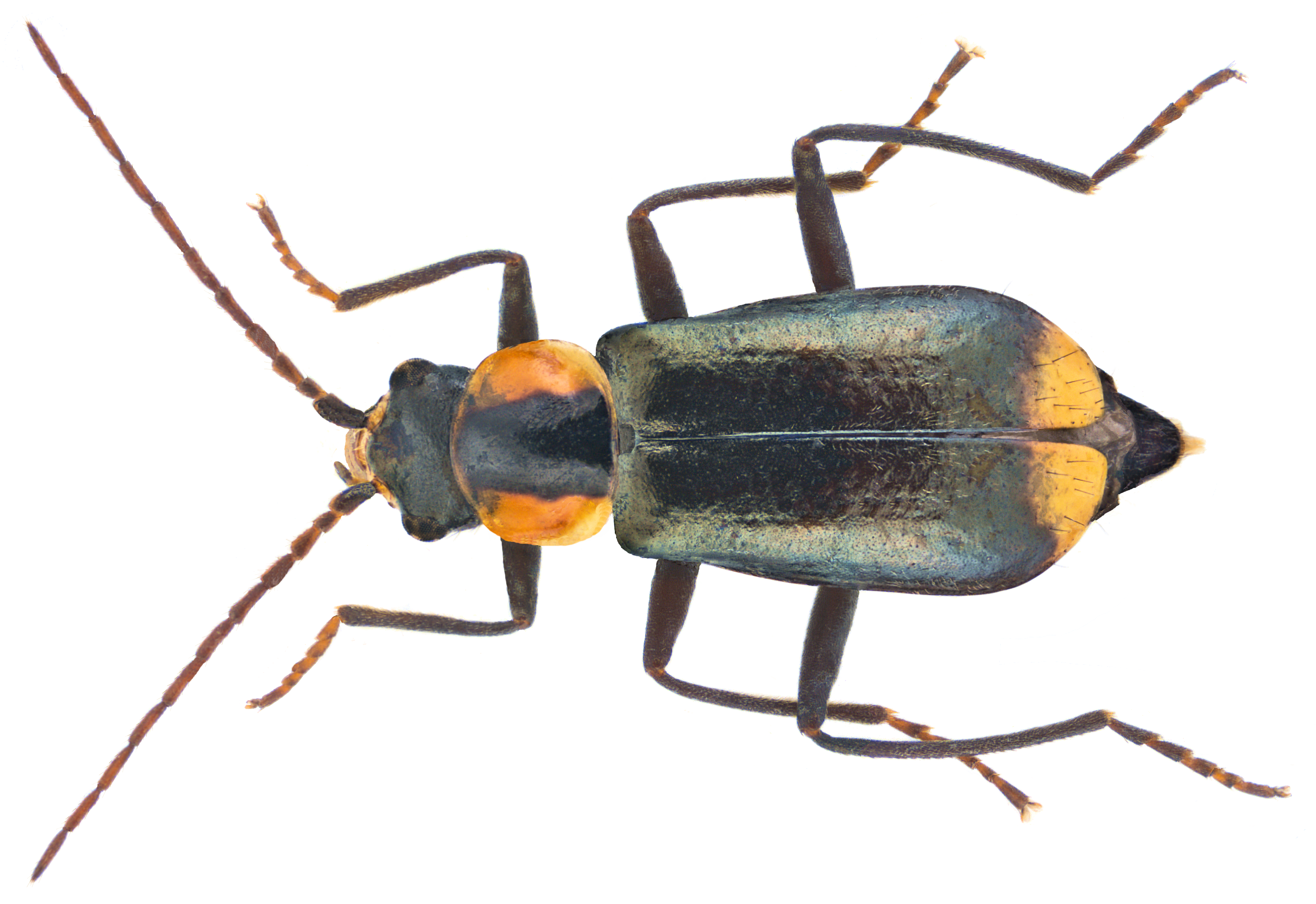
Axinotarsus pulicarius (Fabricius, 1775) female (16010394784)

Axinotarsus pulicarius is 2.75 to 3.75mm long. It has a reddish-yellow pronotum, with a broad, black median band. Its head and eltytra are a shiny, bright grey to nearly black.The tip is reddish-yellow.

== Distribution ==
This beetle is native to Europe where it ranges broadly except for Northern latitudes or Southern Mediterranean regions. It has also been introduced to North America, where it has been observed in the Pacific Northwest notably Greater Vancouver, plus further West around the Great lakes in the Greater Toronto area.

== Biology and behaviour ==
Axinotarsus pulicarius typically feeds on pollen produced by perennial grasses in its native Europe.

The males of this species have excitatory glands, displayed to females during courtship; females will taste its secretions, which in turn lower her inhibitions to mating. The sexes will both engage in frontal tapping. The male will turn his back to the female, who will then bite the gland; the female will then turn her own back to the male, who places his mouthparts on the tip of her abdomen. Brief copulation may be allowed at this point, or the pair may return to frontal tapping.
