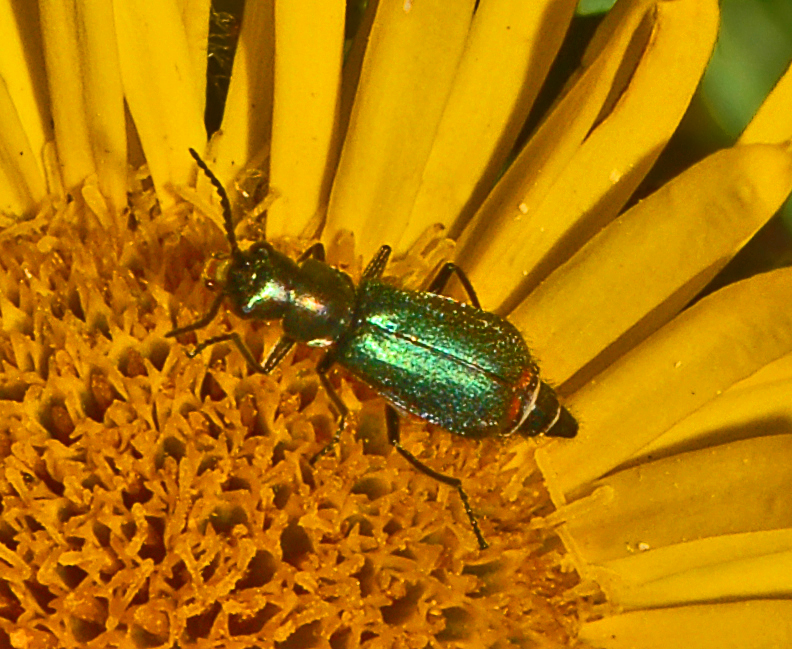
- Malachius bipustulatus

Scientific classification
- Domain: Eukaryota
- Kingdom: Animalia
- Phylum: Arthropoda
- Class: Insecta
- Order: Coleoptera
- Suborder: Polyphaga
- Infraorder: Cucujiformia
- Family: Melyridae
- Subfamily: Malachiinae
- Tribe: Malachiini
- Subtribe: Malachiina
- Genus: Malachius; Fabricius, 1775

= Malachius =

Genus of beetles

Malachius is a genus of soft-winged flower beetles belonging to the family Melyridae subfamily Malachiinae. Malachius species have been reported from Albania, Belgium, Bulgaria, Czech Republic, France, Germany, Hungary, Italy, Poland, Spain, Sweden, Switzerland and in former Yugoslavia.

== Species ==
- Malachius abdominalis
- Malachius abeillei
- Malachius acutipennis Fall 1901
- Malachius aeneus (Linnaeus, 1758)
- Malachius agenjoi Pardo, 1975
- Malachius artvinensis Wittmer, 1974
- Malachius australis Mulsant & Rey, 1867
- Malachius auritus LeConte, 1852
- Malachius bakeri Fall 1910
- Malachius bilyi Svihla, 1987
- Malachius biguttulus Horn, 1870
- Malachius bipustulatus (Linnaeus, 1758)
- Malachius caramanicus Pic, 1912
- Malachius caramanicus Pic, 1912
- Malachius capricornis
- Malachius coccineus Waltl, 1838
- Malachius conformis Erichson, 1840
- Malachius cressius Pic, 1904
- Malachius cyprius (Baudi, 1871)
- Malachius dama Abeille de Perrin, 1888
- Malachius demaisoni Abeille de Perrin, 1900
- Malachius directus
- Malachius ensiculus Abeille de Perrin, 1891
- Malachius elaphus Abeille de Perrin, 1890
- Malachius ephipiger Redtenbacher, 1843
- Malachius faldermanni Faldermann, 1836
- Malachius fuscatus Peyron, 1877
- Malachius graecus Kraatz, 1862
- Malachius heydeni Abeille de Perrin, 1882
- Malachius junceus Peyron, 1877
- Malachius kasosensis Wittmer, 1988
- Malachius kraussi Reitter, 1902
- Malachius labiatus Brullé, 1832
- Malachius lusitanicus Erichson, 1840
- Malachius macer Horn, 1874
- Malachius mariae Abeille de Perrin, 1885
- Malachius mirandus LeConte, 1859
- Malachius mixtus Horn, 1872
- Malachius monticola Kiesenwetter, 1878
- Malachius pickai Svihla, 1987
- Malachius reducticornis
- Malachius rubidus Erichson, 1840 [inc. carnifex Erichson, 1840]
- Malachius saltinii Franzini & Plonski, 2021
- Malachius sculptifrons
- Malachius scutellaris Erichson, 1840
- Malachius securiclatus Baudi, 1873
- Malachius semiaeneus Abeille de Perrin, 1891
- Malachius stolatus Mulsant & Godart, 1855
- Malachius subangustatus
- Malachius suturalis
- Malachius testaceipes
- Malachius thevenetii Horn, 1874
- Malachius tokmakensis
- Malachius truncaticornis
- Malachius ulkei Horn, 1872
- Malachius viridulus
- Malachius vittatus
- Malachius yunnanus
