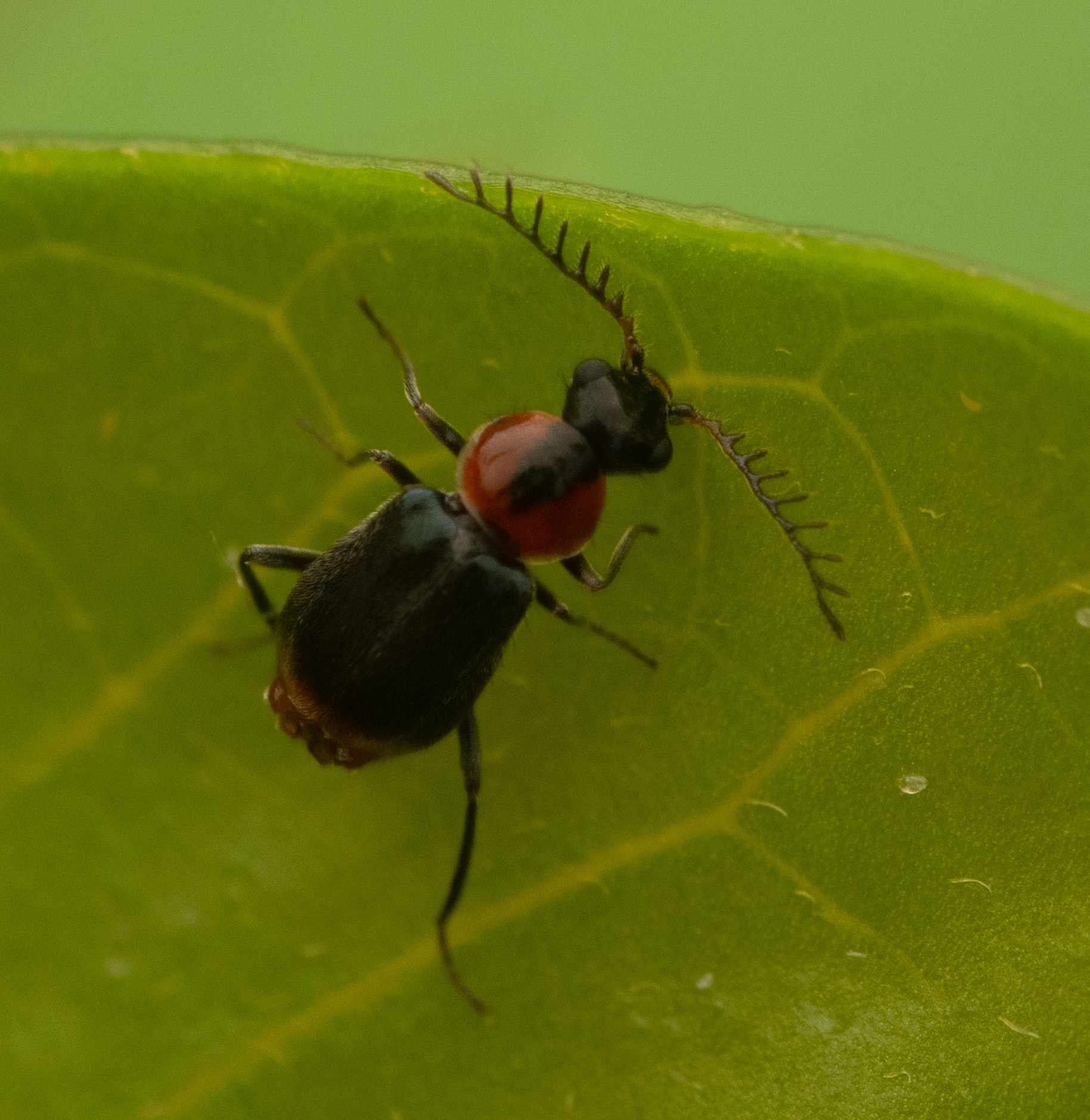
- Nepachys ramicornis

Scientific classification
- Domain: Eukaryota
- Kingdom: Animalia
- Phylum: Arthropoda
- Class: Insecta
- Order: Coleoptera
- Suborder: Polyphaga
- Infraorder: Cucujiformia
- Family: Melyridae
- Subfamily: Malachiinae
- Tribe: Malachiini
- Subtribe: Attalina
- Genus: Nepachys; Thomson, 1859

Synonyms
- Ebaeomorphus Pic, 1904

= Nepachys =

Genus of beetles

Nepachys is a genus of beetles belonging to the family Melyridae.

The species of this genus are found in Europe, South Africa, and Asia.

== Species ==
The following species are recognised in the genus Nepachys:

- Nepachys cardiacae (Linnaeus, 1760)
- Nepachys iranicus Svihla, 1987
- Nepachys peucedani (Abeille de Perrin, 1885)
- Nepachys ramicornis (Boheman 1851)
- Nepachys spec Svihla, 1987
