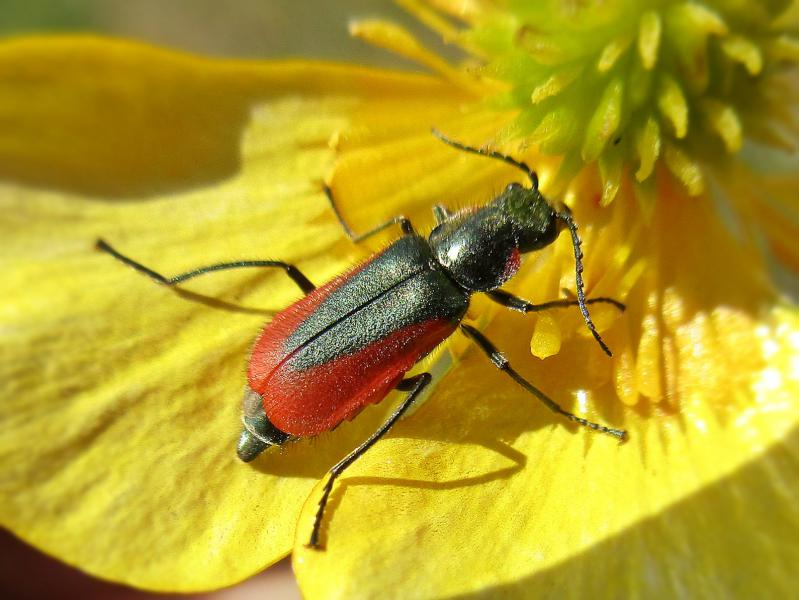

Scientific classification
- Kingdom: Animalia
- Phylum: Arthropoda
- Clade: Pancrustacea
- Class: Insecta
- Order: Coleoptera
- Suborder: Polyphaga
- Infraorder: Cucujiformia
- Family: Melyridae
- Genus: Malachius
- Species: M. aeneus

Binomial name
- Malachius aeneus (Linnaeus, 1758)

= Malachius aeneus =

Species of beetle

Malachius aeneus, the scarlet malachite beetle, is a species of soft-winged flower beetle in the family Melyridae. The beetle was introduced to North America in 1852, and is now widespread. The larvae are frequently found near cereal crops and are known predators of Brassicogethes aeneus in Great Britain.

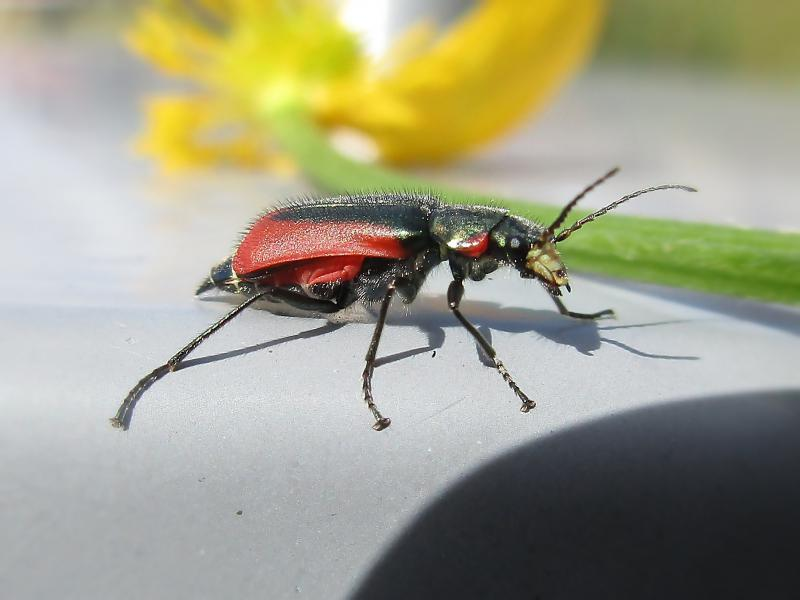
Scarlet malachite beetle, Malachius aeneus

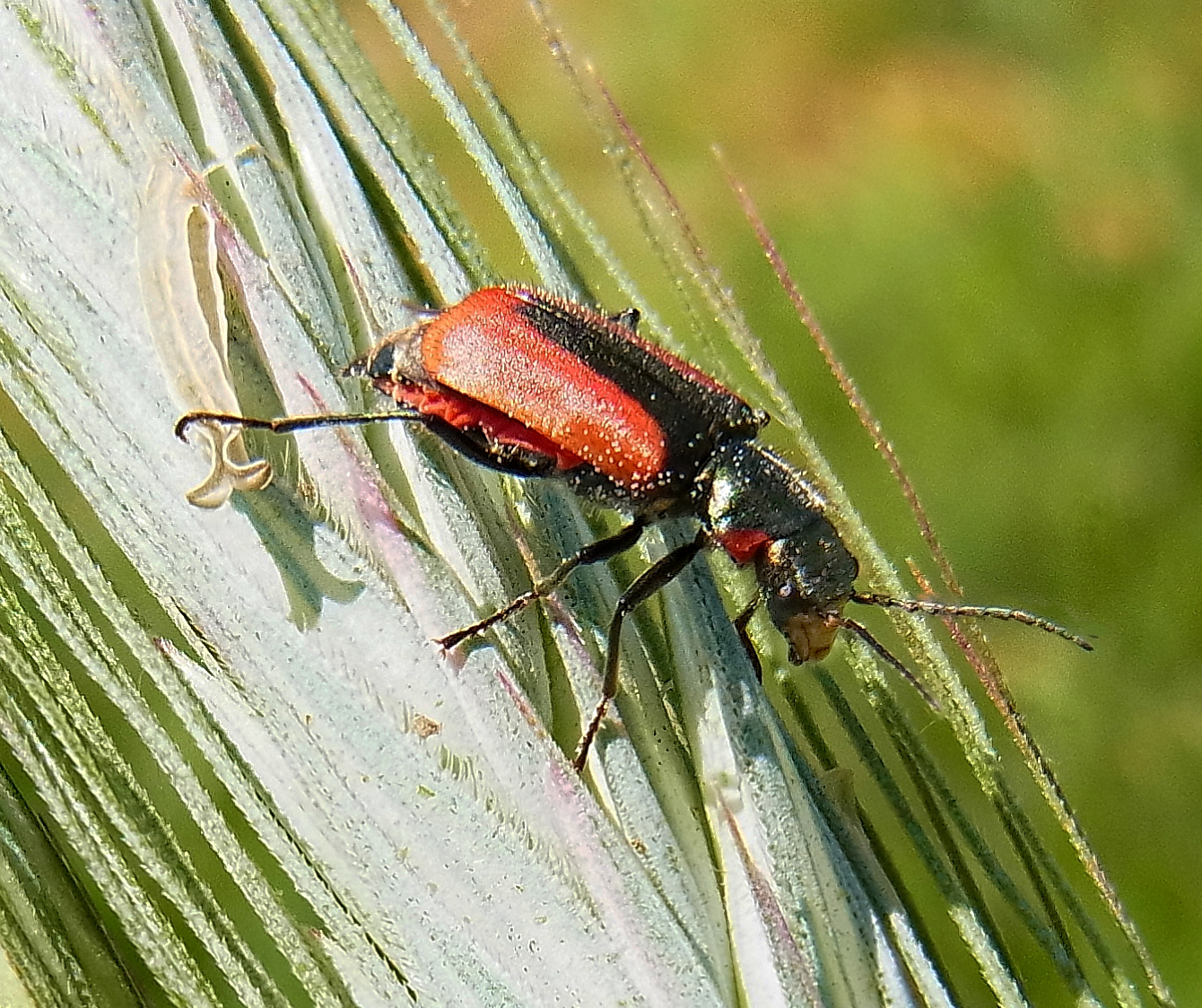
Scarlet malachite beetle, Malachius aeneus
