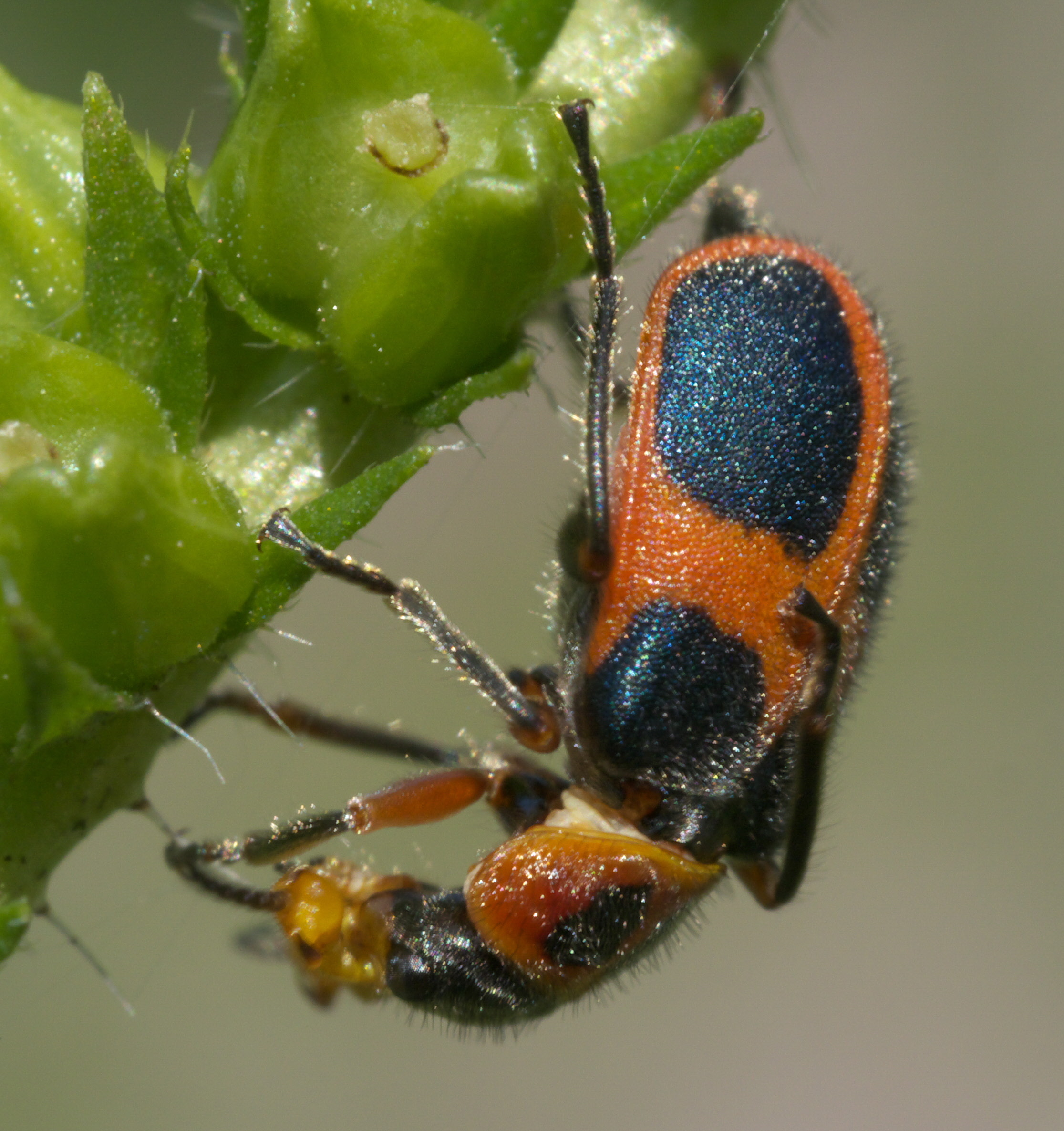

Scientific classification
- Kingdom: Animalia
- Phylum: Arthropoda
- Clade: Pancrustacea
- Class: Insecta
- Order: Coleoptera
- Suborder: Polyphaga
- Infraorder: Cucujiformia
- Family: Melyridae
- Subfamily: Malachiinae
- Tribe: Malachiini
- Genus: Collops; Erichson, 1840

= Collops (beetle) =

Genus of beetles

Collops is a genus of soft-winged flower beetles in the family Melyridae. There are over forty described species in Collops.

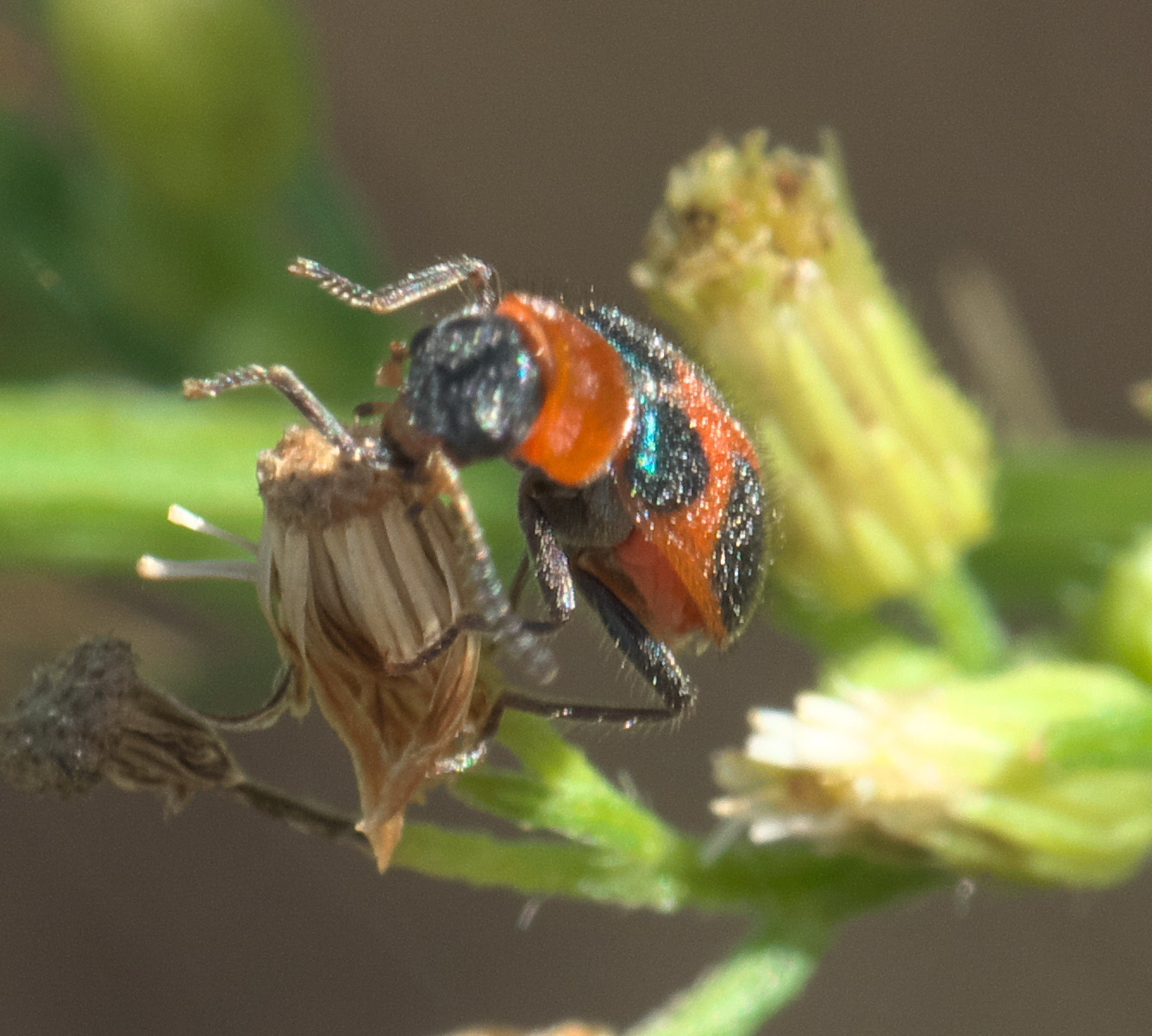
Collops quadrimaculatus

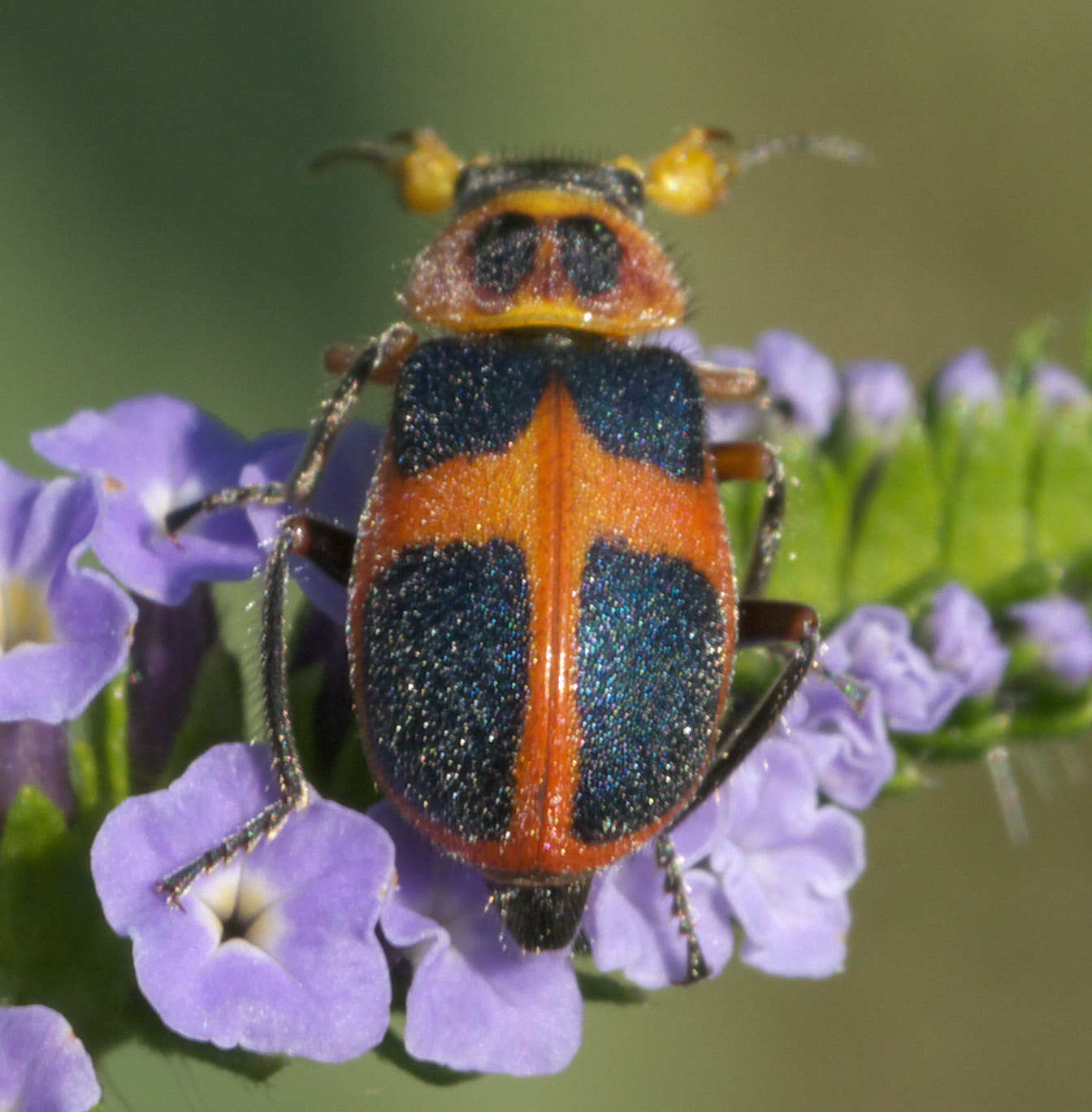
Collops

== Species ==
These 66 species belong to the genus Collops:

- Collops alatauensis Wittmer, 1992
- Collops arizonensis Marshall, 1951
- Collops aulicus Erichson, 1840
- Collops balteatus LeConte, 1852 (red cross beetle)
- Collops bicolripennis Pic, 1920
- Collops bipunctatus Say, 1823 (two-spotted melyrid)
- Collops blanda Erichson, 1840
- Collops blandus
- Collops bridgeri Tanner, 1936
- Collops carri Evers, 1993
- Collops cinctus Von Gebler, 1847
- Collops confluens LeConte, 1852
- Collops cribrosus LeConte, 1852
- Collops crusoe Fall, 1912
- Collops dimorphicus Russel, 1966
- Collops discretus Fall, 1912
- Collops dux Fall, 1912
- Collops eximius Erichson (synonym for C. nigriceps)
- Collops femoratus Schaeffer, 1912
- Collops flavicinctus Fall, 1910
- Collops flavicornis Dalman, 1823
- Collops flavolimbatus Champion, 1914
- Collops frontalis Gorham, 1914
- Collops gemina Erichson, 1840
- Collops georgianus Fall, 1910
- Collops grandis
- Collops granellus Fall, 1912
- Collops hirtellus LeConte, 1876 (hairy soft-winged flower beetle)
- Collops histrio Erichson, 1840
- Collops insulatus LeConte, 1866
- Collops knulli Marshall, 1951
- Collops laticollis Horn, 1870
- Collops lebasi Erichson, 1840
- Collops limbellus Gemminger and Harold, 1868
- Collops marginellus LeConte, 1852
- Collops marginicollis LeConte, 1852
- Collops necopinus Fall, 1912
- Collops nigerrimus Wittmer, 1992
- Collops nigriceps Say, 1823 (black-headed melyrid/eastern coastal collops)
- Collops nigritus Schaeffer, 1912
- Collops obscuricornis Champion, 1914
- Collops pallipes Marshall, 1951
- Collops parvus Schaeffer, 1912
- Collops peninsularis Marshall, 1951
- Collops pulchellus Horn, 1870
- Collops punctatus LeConte, 1852
- Collops punctulatus LeConte, 1852
- Collops quadriguttatus
- Collops quadrimaculatus Fabricius, 1798 (four-spotted collops)
- Collops reflexus LeConte, 1876
- Collops scutellatus Schaeffer, 1912
- Collops similis Schaeffer, 1912
- Collops simplex Marshall, 1951
- Collops subaenus Fall, 1912
- Collops sublimbatus Schaeffer, 1912 (considered a synonym of C. tricolor by Fall, 1912)
- Collops subtropicus Fall, 1912
- Collops susamirensis Wittmer, 1992
- Collops tibialis Schaeffer, 1912)
- Collops tricolor Say, 1823 (black-headed melyrid)
- Collops validus Horn, 1870
- Collops versatilis Fall, 1912
- Collops vicarius Fall, 1912
- Collops vittatus Say, 1823 (striped collops)
- † Collops desuetus Wickham, 1914
- † Collops extrusus Wickham, 1914
- † Collops priscus Wickham, 1914
