= Ablechrus =

Scientific classification
- Domain: Eukaryota
- Kingdom: Animalia
- Phylum: Arthropoda
- Class: Insecta
- Order: Coleoptera
- Suborder: Polyphaga
- Infraorder: Cucujiformia
- Family: Melyridae
- Tribe: Malachiini
- Genus: Ablechrus; Waterhouse, 1877

Genus of beetles

Ablechrus is a genus of beetles belonging to the family Melyridae.

The species of this genus are found in America.

Species:

- Ablechrus caravellae Constantin, 2012
- Ablechrus moulini Constantin, 2017
