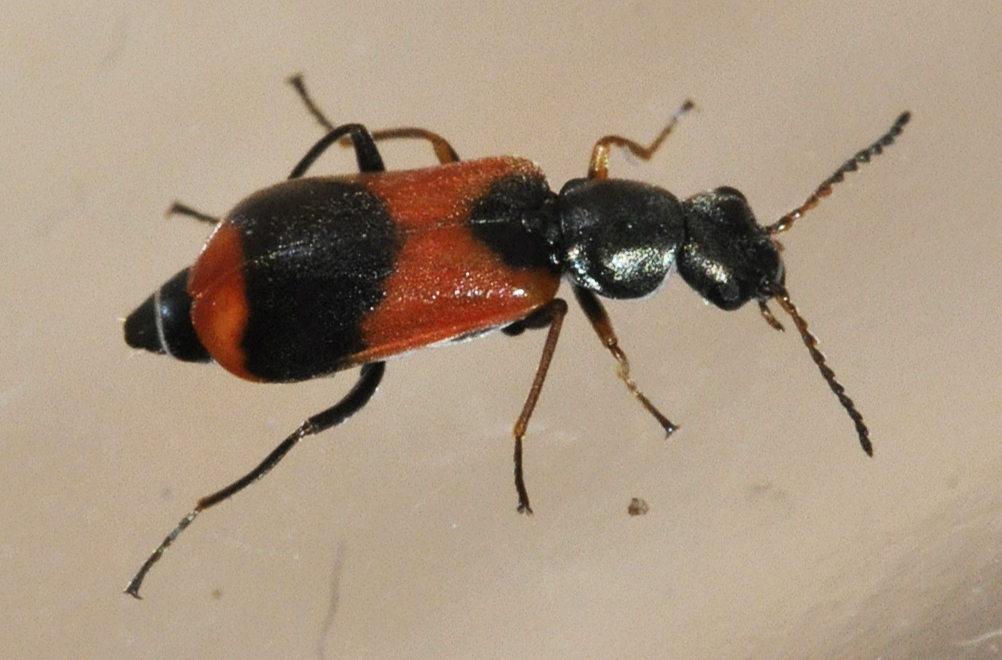
- Anthocomus equestris

Scientific classification
- Kingdom: Animalia
- Phylum: Arthropoda
- Class: Insecta
- Order: Coleoptera
- Suborder: Polyphaga
- Infraorder: Cucujiformia
- Family: Melyridae
- Tribe: Malachiini
- Genus: Anthocomus; Erichson, 1840

= Anthocomus =

Genus of beetles

Anthocomus is a genus of beetles in the family Melyridae. The species of this genus are found in Europe and North America.

== Species ==
- Anthocomus apalochroides Abeille de Perrin, 1891
- Anthocomus bipartitus Wittmer, 1982
- Anthocomus creticus Evers, 1994
- Anthocomus denticornis Wittmer, 1986
- Anthocomus doria Baudi di Selve, 1873
- Anthocomus equestris (Fabricius, 1781)
- Anthocomus fasciatus (Linnaeus, 1758)
- Anthocomus flaveolus Abeille, 1883
- Anthocomus haeres Abeille, 1883
- Anthocomus humeralis Morawitz, 1861
- Anthocomus inimpressus Wittmer, 1982
- Anthocomus miniatus (Kolenati, 1846)
- Anthocomus pristinus (Fall, 1901)
- Anthocomus pupillatus Abeille de Perrin, 1890
- Anthocomus rufus (Herbst, 1784)
- Anthocomus thalassinus (Abeille, 1883)
