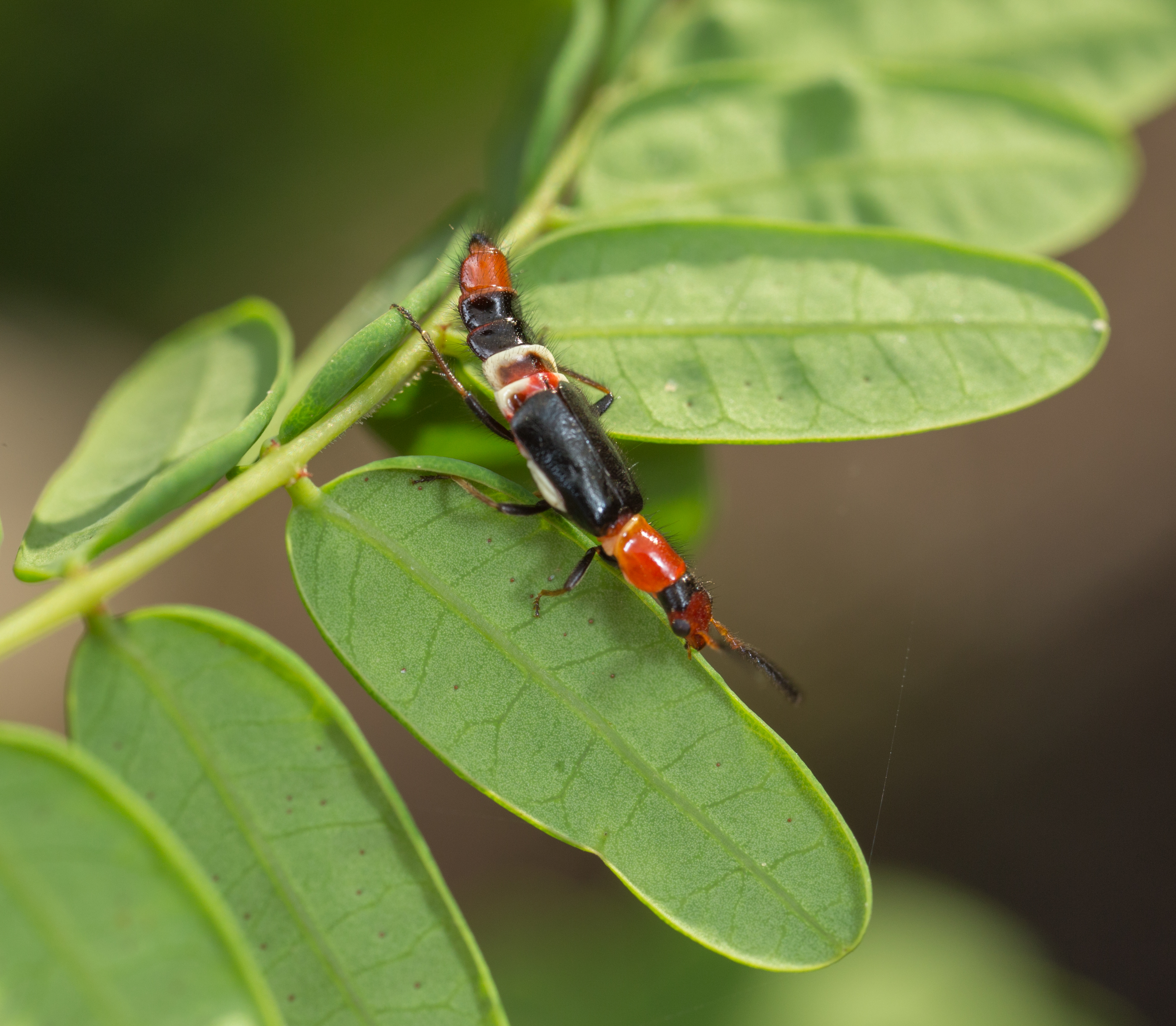
- Carphurus sp.

Scientific classification
- Domain: Eukaryota
- Kingdom: Animalia
- Phylum: Arthropoda
- Class: Insecta
- Order: Coleoptera
- Suborder: Polyphaga
- Infraorder: Cucujiformia
- Family: Melyridae
- Subfamily: Malachiinae
- Tribe: Carphurini; Champion, 1923

= Carphurini =

Tribe of beetles

Carphurini is a tribe of soft-wing flower beetles (beetles of the family Melyridae) in the subfamily Malachiinae.

== Genera ==
- Afrocarphurus
- Apteromalachius
- Balanophorus
- Brachyhedibius
- Carphuroides
- Carphuromorphus
- Carphurus
- Chaetocoelus
- Choresine
- Falsolaius
- Helcogaster
- Metachoresine
- Microcarphurus
- Neocarphurus
- Telocarphurus
