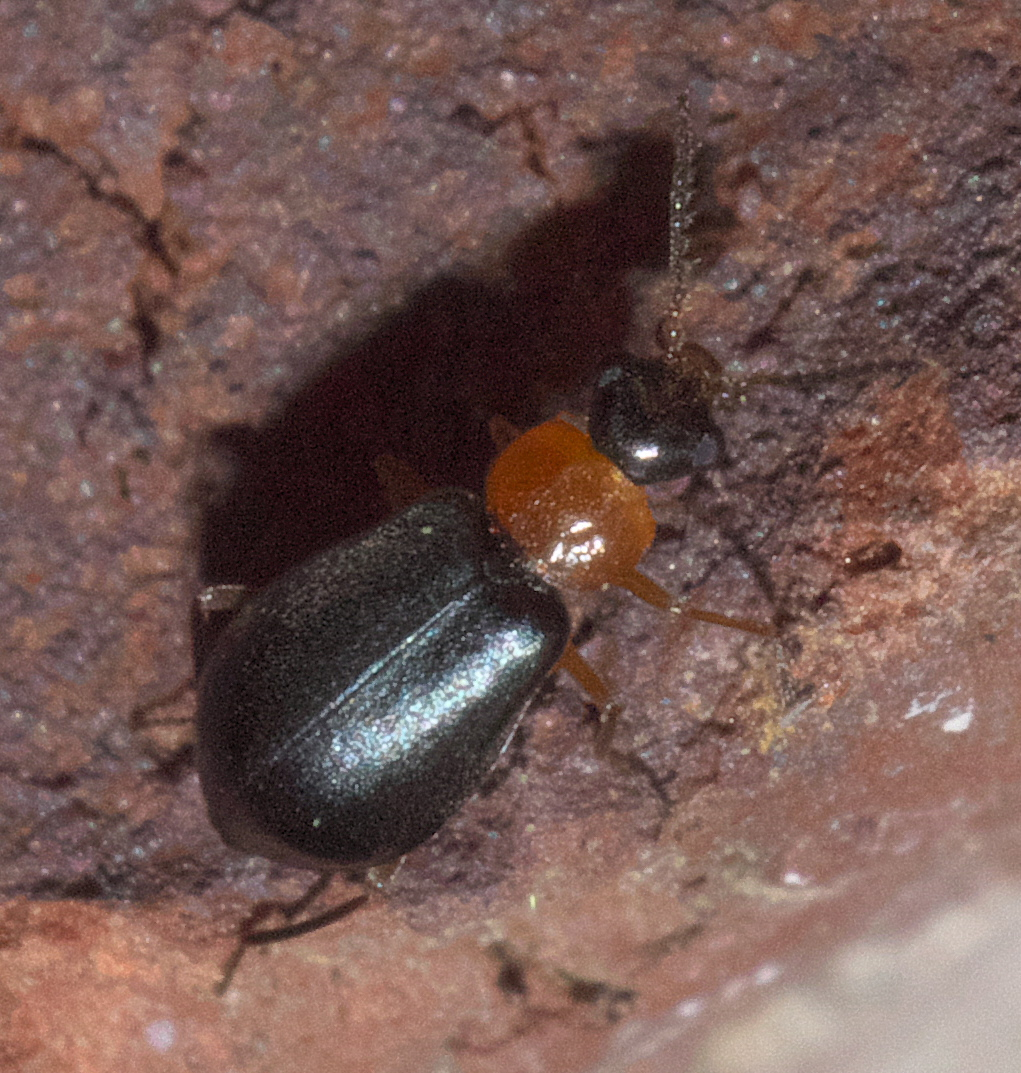

Scientific classification
- Domain: Eukaryota
- Kingdom: Animalia
- Phylum: Arthropoda
- Class: Insecta
- Order: Coleoptera
- Suborder: Polyphaga
- Infraorder: Cucujiformia
- Family: Melyridae
- Tribe: Malachiini
- Subtribe: Ebaeina
- Genus: Hypebaeus; Kiesenwetter, 1863

= Hypebaeus =

Genus of beetles

Hypebaeus is a genus of beetles belonging to the family Melyridae.

The species of this genus are found in Europe and Northern America.

Species:

- Hypebaeus albifrons (Fabricius, 1775)
- Hypebaeus albo-facialis J.Sahlberg, 1908
