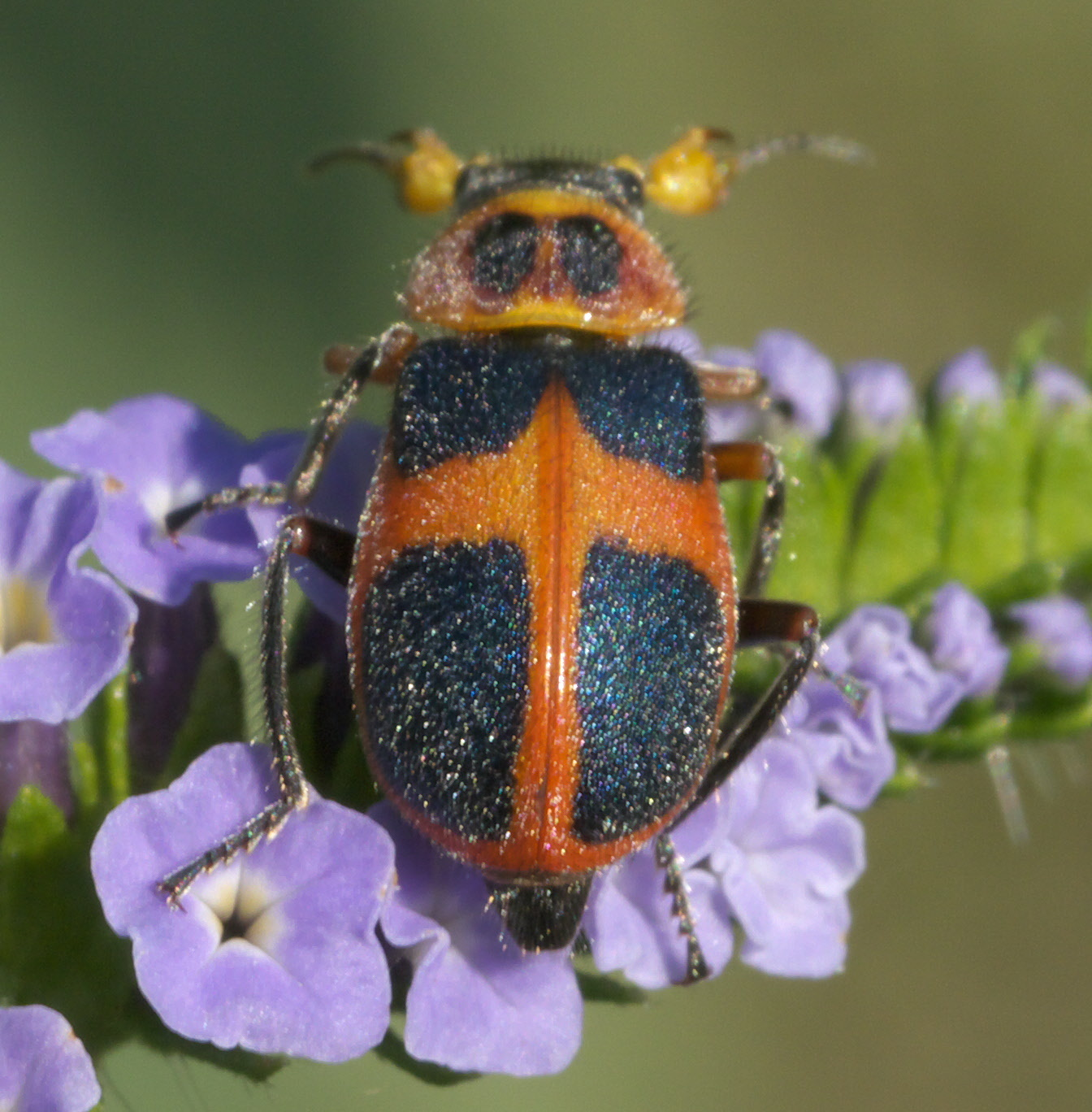

Scientific classification
- Kingdom: Animalia
- Phylum: Arthropoda
- Clade: Pancrustacea
- Class: Insecta
- Order: Coleoptera
- Suborder: Polyphaga
- Infraorder: Cucujiformia
- Family: Melyridae
- Genus: Collops
- Species: C. balteatus

Binomial name
- Collops balteatus LeConte, 1852

= Collops balteatus =

Red cross beetle

Species of beetle

Collops balteatus, commonly known as the red cross beetle, is a species of soft-winged flower beetle in the family Melyridae. It is found in the south-central United States and Mexico.
