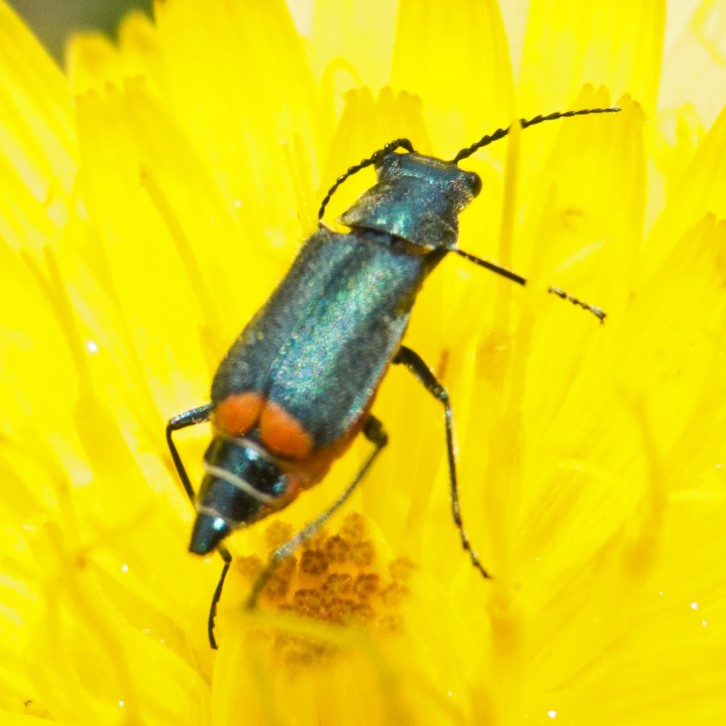
- Ceratistes dentifrons

Scientific classification
- Kingdom: Animalia
- Phylum: Arthropoda
- Class: Insecta
- Order: Coleoptera
- Suborder: Polyphaga
- Infraorder: Cucujiformia
- Family: Melyridae
- Tribe: Malachiini
- Genus: Ceratistes; Fischer von Waldheim, 1844

Synonyms
- Hammamalachius Evers, 1985

= Ceratistes (beetle) =

Genus of beetles

Ceratistes is a genus of beetles in the family Melyridae.

The species of this genus are found in southern Europe.

== Species ==
The following species are recognised in the genus Ceratistes:

- Ceratistes cervulus (Reitter, 1894)
- Ceratistes dentifrons (Erichson, 1840)
- Ceratistes dilaticornis (Germar, 1823)
