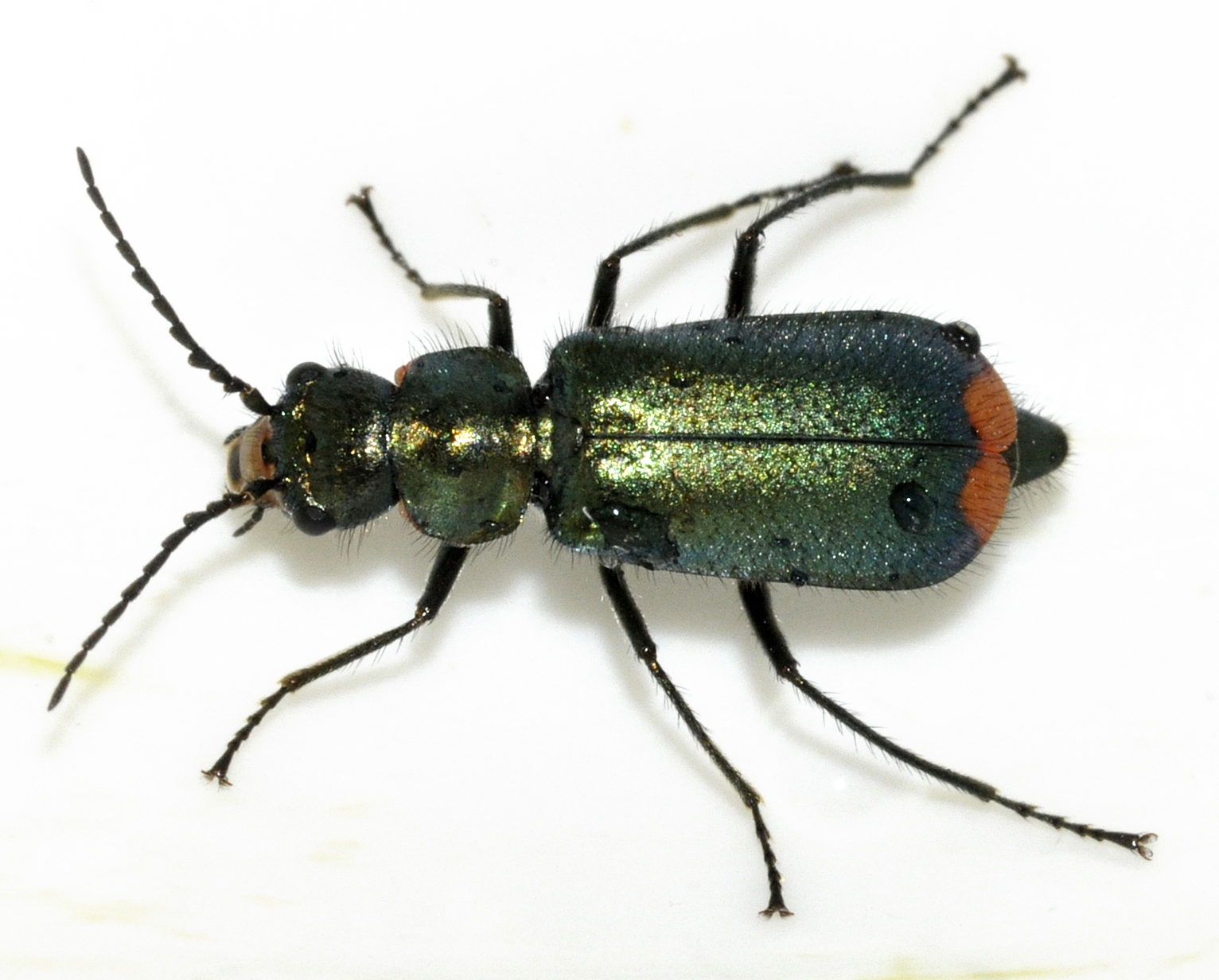
- Malachius bipustulatus

Scientific classification
- Kingdom: Animalia
- Phylum: Arthropoda
- Clade: Pancrustacea
- Class: Insecta
- Order: Coleoptera
- Suborder: Polyphaga
- Infraorder: Cucujiformia
- Family: Melyridae
- Subfamily: Malachiinae; Leach, 1817

Tribes
- Amalthocini Majer, 2002; Apalochrini Mulsant & Rey, 1867; Attalomimini Majer, 1995; Carphurini Champion, 1923; Lemphini Wittmer, 1976; Malachiini Fleming, 1821; Pagurodactylini Constantin, 2001

Synonyms
- Malachiidae Leach, 1817; Attalomimidae Majer, 1995

= Malachiinae =

Subfamily of beetles

Malachiinae is a subfamily of beetles of the family Melyridae and having a global distribution.

== Description ==
Malachiinae have peculiar orange structures along the sides of the abdomen, which may be everted and saclike or withdrawn into the body and inconspicuous.

The most common North American species belongs to the genus Collops (C. quadrimaculatus) and is reddish, with two bluish black spots on each elytron.

== Selected genera ==
- Ablechrus
- Afrocarphurus
- Anthocomus
- Anthomalachius
- Apalochrus
- Apteromalachius
- Attalus
- Attalusinus
- Attalomimus
- Axinotarsus
- Balanophorus
- Brachemys
- Brachyhedibius
- Carphuroides
- Carphuromorphus
- Carphurus
- Cephalogonia
- Cephaloncus
- Cerapheles
- Ceratistes
- Chaetocoelus
- Charopus
- Choresine
- Clanoptilus
- Collops
- Colotes
- Condylops
- Cordylepherus
- Cyrtosus
- Dromanthomorphus
- Ebaeus
- Endeodes
- Falsolaius
- Fortunatius
- Haplomalachius
- Helcogaster
- Hypebaeus
- Ifnidius
- Laius
- Malachiomimus
- Malachius
- Metachoresine
- Micrinus
- Microcarphurus
- Microlipus
- Neocarphurus
- Nepachys
- Nodopus
- Pelochrus
- Planasiella
- Protapalochrus
- Psiloderes
- Sphinginus
- Tanaops
- Telocarphurus
- Temnopsophus
- Transvestitus
- Troglops
- Trophimus
