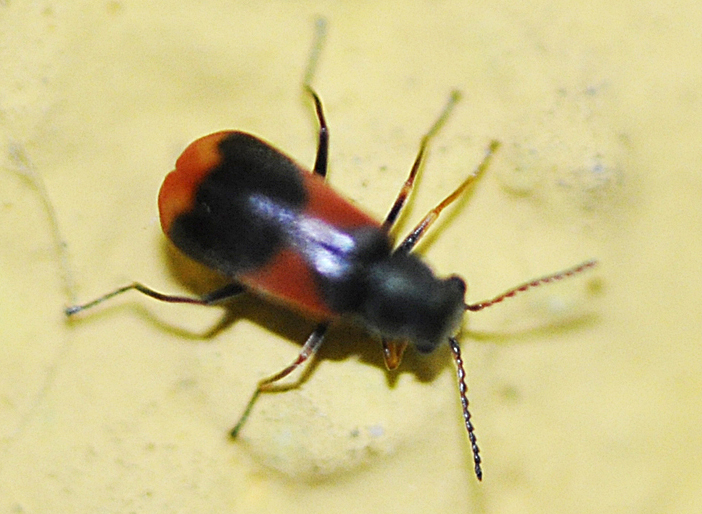
- Anthocomus equestris

Scientific classification
- Kingdom: Animalia
- Phylum: Arthropoda
- Clade: Pancrustacea
- Class: Insecta
- Order: Coleoptera
- Suborder: Polyphaga
- Infraorder: Cucujiformia
- Family: Melyridae
- Subfamily: Malachiinae
- Tribe: Malachiini; Fleming, 1821

Synonyms
- Polycystophoridae Gistel, 1856; Apalochrini Mulsant & Rey, 1867; Colotini Abeille de Perrin, 1890; Attalini Abeille de Perrin, 1891; Ebaeini Portevin, 1931; Paratini Portevin, 1931

= Malachiini =

Tribe of beetles

Malachiini is a large tribe of soft-winged flower beetles in the family Melyridae.

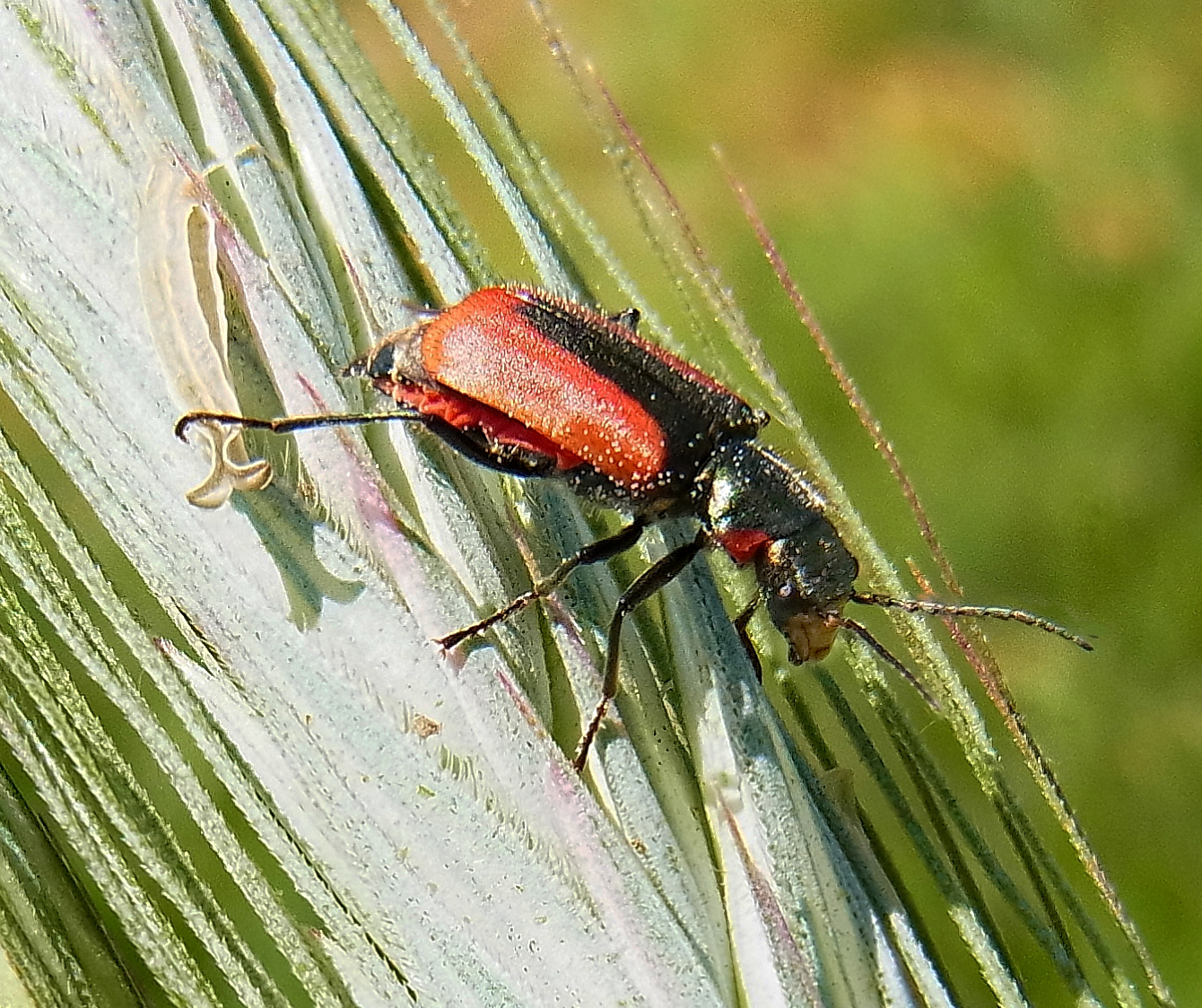
Malachius aeneus

== Selected genera ==
- Ablechroides Wittmer, 1976
- Ablechrus Waterhouse, 1877
- Anthocomus Erichson, 1840
- Antholinus Mulsant & Rey, 1867
- Attalogonia Wittmer, 1976
- Attalus Erichson, 1840
- Attalusinus Leng, 1918
- Axinotarsus Motschulsky, 1854
- Cerapheles Mulsant, 1867
- Ceratistes Fischer von Waldheim, 1844
- Charopus Erichson, 1840
- Clanoptilus Motschoulsky, 1854
- Collops Erichson, 1840
- Condylattalus Wittmer, 1976
- Condylops Redtenbacher, 1849
- Dicranolaius Champion, 1921
- Ebaeus Erichson, 1840
- Endeodes LeConte, 1859
- Fortunatius Evers, 1971
- Hypebaeus Kiesenwetter, 1863
- Ifnidius Escalera, 1940
- Laius Guérin-Méneville, 1830
- Macrotrichopherus Evers, 1962
- Malachiomimus Champion, 1921
- Malachius Fabricius, 1775
- Microlipus Leconte, 1852
- Nepachys Thomson, 1859
- Nodopus Marshall, 1951
- Opsablechrus Wittmer, 1976
- Sphinginus Mulsant & Rey, 1867
- Sternodeattalus Wittmer, 1970
- Tanaops Leconte, 1859
- Temnopsophus Horn, 1872
- Troglops Erichson, 1840
- Trophimus Horn, 1870
- Tucumanius Pic, 1903
