= Antiarigenin =

- Skeletal structure of antiarigenin

Names
- IUPAC name (3β,5β,12β)-3,5,12,14-Tetrahydroxy-19-oxo-card-20(22)-enolide

Identifiers
CAS Number	749-72-4
3D model (JSmol)	Interactive image
ChemSpider	10050281
PubChem CID	11875953
- InChI: InChI=1S/C23H32O7/c1-20-15(13-8-19(27)30-11-13)4-7-23(20,29)16-3-6-22(28)10-14(25)2-5-21(22,12-24)17(16)9-18(20)26/h8,12,14-18,25-26,28-29H,2-7,9-11H2,1H3/t14-,15+,16+,17-,18+,20-,21-,22-,23-/m0/s1 Key: FMCCZSFBYFYVDN-XSGAPQDKSA-N
- SMILES: C[C@@]12[C@H](CC[C@@]1([C@@H]3CC[C@@]4(C[C@H](CC[C@@]4([C@H]3C[C@H]2O)C=O)O)O)O)C5=CC(=O)OC5

Properties
Chemical formula	C_{23}H_{32}O_{7}
Molar mass	420.502 g·mol^{−1}
Appearance	White to off-white crystalline solid
Melting point	Decomposes above 240 °C
Solubility in water	Poorly soluble

Hazards
- Occupational safety and health (OHS/OSH)
Main hazards	Highly toxic cardiac poison
- Lethal dose or concentration (LD, LC)
LD_{50} (median dose)	<0.1 mg/kg (mammalian, oral)
- Except where otherwise noted, data are given for materials in their standard state (at 25 °C [77 °F], 100 kPa). Infobox references

Antiarigenin is a highly toxic cardenolide aglycone found in the latex of Antiaris toxicaria (upas tree). As the steroid core of α-antiarin and β-antiarin glycosides, it has been used for centuries by indigenous peoples of Southeast Asia in blowdart arrow poisons. It functions as a potent Na^{+}/K^{+}-ATPase inhibitor and has shown potential to induce apoptosis in chemotherapy-resistant cancer cells through orphan nuclear receptor Nur77 modulation.

== Natural occurrence ==
Antiarigenin serves as a chemotaxonomic marker for the genus Antiaris (Moraceae). A. toxicaria is a large deciduous tree native to tropical regions from West Africa through the Indian subcontinent and Southern China to Indonesia and Northern Australia. The tree's milky latex contains high concentrations of cardenolides, particularly in the bark, with lower amounts in seeds and leaves.

Antiarigenin is rarely stored freely; glycosyltransferase enzymes attach sugars, usually L-rhamnose or D-antiarose, to the C-3 hydroxyl group, forming the parent glycosides. Biosynthesis proceeds via the pregnane pathway, with phytosterol precursors undergoing side-chain cleavage, stereoselective reduction, specific hydroxylations, and oxidation of the C-19 methyl group to an aldehyde.

== Chemical structure ==
Antiarigenin has a tetracyclic gonane nucleus with a cis–trans–cis ring fusion pattern. The A/B ring junction is cis-fused (5β-H), creating a molecular "kink" essential for binding to the cardiac glycoside receptor site on Na^{+}/K^{+}-ATPase. Key functional groups include four hydroxyl groups (C-3β, C-5β, C-12β, C-14β), a C-19 aldehyde (distinguishing it from digitoxigenin), and a butenolide (unsaturated γ-lactone) ring at C-17β. This places it in the strophanthidin class of cardenolides.

The structure is confirmed by NMR and X-ray crystallography. The ^{1}H NMR shows a characteristic aldehyde proton at δ_{H} 9.8–10.5 ppm, while ^{13}C NMR reveals the aldehyde carbon at ~208 ppm and lactone carbonyl at ~175 ppm.

== Mechanism of action ==
Antiarigenin binds the Na^{+}/K^{+}-ATPase (sodium pump), stabilizing it in the phosphorylated E2-P conformation and blocking ion exchange. In cardiac myocytes, this raises intracellular calcium, producing a positive inotropic effect at therapeutic doses or cardiac arrest at toxic doses.

Antiarigenin shows isoform selectivity among Na^{+}/K^{+}-ATPase α-subunits, preferentially targeting the α3 isoform enriched in neurons and cardiac conduction tissue. This may explain prominent neurotoxicity in Antiaris poisoning.

A second mechanism involves Nur77 modulation. Antiarigenin triggers nuclear export of Nur77, which then binds Bcl-2 at the mitochondrial membrane, converting it from an anti-apoptotic to a pro-apoptotic protein. This leads to cytochrome c release and caspase activation, effective even in Bcl-2-overexpressing chemoresistant cancer cells.

== Ethnobotany ==
Indigenous groups in Southeast Asia, notably the Dayak of Borneo, have used A. toxicaria latex in blowdart poisons (ipoh, tajum) for hunting and warfare. Preparation required careful dehydration to concentrate cardenolides without hydrolyzing heat-labile glycosidic bonds.

Antiaris latex was typically combined with Strychnos extracts containing strychnine and brucine. This synergy ensured rapid immobilization: antiarigenin caused cardiotoxicity while strychnine, a glycine receptor antagonist, induced tetanic convulsions.

== See also ==
- Cardiac glycoside
- Cardenolide
- Digitalis
- Strophanthin
- Ouabain
- Antiaris toxicaria
