= Sumpitan =

Sumpitan may refer to:

- Sumpit, a traditional blowgun weapon from the Philippines, Borneo, and Sulawesi
- Sumpitan (ship), a ship formerly the Empire Seafarer, scrapped 1965
