= Fukiya =

Japanese blowgun and sport

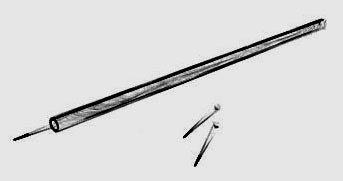
A fukiya

The fukiya (吹き矢) is the Japanese blowgun, as well as the term for the associated sport. It consists of a 1.2 m (3 ft 11 in) tube, with darts approximately 20 cm (7.9 in) in length. Unlike modern Western blowguns, the fukiya has no mouthpiece: instead, a shooter must maintain a seal with the lips while forcefully exhaling. The darts used in the fukiya are called fukibari. Traditionally, fukibari were 5 cm (2.0 in) in length.

In Japan, fukiya is considered to be an archery sport, maintained by the Japan Sports Fukiya Association. In order to promote fukiya, the International Fukiya Association (IFA) was formed, based in Japan. The main organizations under the IFA are the American Association (ASBA), and the French Federation (FSBA).

== History ==
The fukiya is often considered to have been a weapon of the ninja. It is known that in the past, there were numerous schools of martial arts and ninjutsu (such as Togakure-ryū) which used the fukiya and fukibari alone (as senbon).

A typical ninjutsu fukiya is around 50 cm (20 in), which is shorter than the sport fukiya, and does shorten the effective range. Thus, even in theory, ninja would have had to use special darts with poisoned tips in order for it to work, and fired from a concealed location. Most likely, it was used similar to shuriken, as a distraction.

The blowgun can also double as a breathing pipe and straw to enable the ninja practitioner to better survive in the wilderness.

== Science of fukiya ==
The range of a fukiya is determined by size (diameter), weight, length and material of its basic component, the tube. Pressure built up in the tube from the player's breath and the technique that the player uses to channel the breath into the tube affects the speed that the dart will exit the muzzle.

Weight will affect a player's ability to hold the tube steady, and arm fatigue level over a period of time.

== Sport fukiya ==
Like any sport, fukiya has certain guidelines for its equipment. In general, international guidelines set by IFA are less strict than JSFA. Currently, the specifications for international competitions are as follows:

- Equipment: Can be self-made (Japanese competitions require properly made equipment)
  - Pipe
    - length: 120 cm (47 in); For practice at home, students can employ a 50 cm (20 in) pipe, with the target placed at 5–6 m (16–20 ft) away
    - diameter: 13 mm (0.51 in) if possible; anywhere between 12 mm (0.47 in) to 13 mm (0.51 in), so 0.5 in (13 mm) is acceptable for International competition
    - Weight: 150 g (5.3 oz) for beginners; 600 g (21 oz) for advanced
  - Darts: wedge shape if possible; conical shape is acceptable; guidelines can vary
    - length: Approximately 20 cm (7.9 in) in length
    - weight: 0.8 g (0.028 oz)
- Competition
  - Distance from target: 10 m (33 ft); 8 m (26 ft) for handicap competitors; 6 m (20 ft) for novice; (5–6 m (16–20 ft) for practice, using a shorter blowgun)
  - Number of darts in use: 30
  - Target: 3 rings
    - bulls-eye: 6 cm (2.4 in) diameter, 7 points
    - inner ring: 12 cm (4.7 in) in diameter, 5 points
    - outer ring: 18 cm (7.1 in) in diameter, 3 points
    - Bulleye's height from the ground: 160 cm (63 in) (90 cm (35 in) for handicap)
  - Point calculation: 6 rounds of 5 shots are taken, with a maximum score of 210 points
  - Time allotted: not exceeding 25 minutes, for all 30 darts, including shooting, scoring, retrieval, and cleaning the barrel
- Level advancement (minimum score required)
  - 3 kyu: 60 points
  - 2 kyu: 75 points
  - 1 kyu: 90-105 points (depends on association)
  - shodan: 105-119 points (depends on association)
  - 2 dan: 120 points
  - 3 dan: 150 points
  - 4 dan: 162 points
  - 5 dan: 175 points
  - Master level I: three 186 points scores

== Associations ==
- International Fukiya Association
  - United States Blowgun Association (USA)
- Japan Sport Fukiya Association (Japan)

== Popular culture ==
- Teenage Mutant Ninja Turtles features fukiyas being used by the Ultimate Ninja and Foot Ninjas.
- In Princess Mononoke, Jigo's men use fukiyas which they keep disguised as parasols when not in use.
- A fukiya was used by a ninja in Deadliest Warrior.

== See also ==
- Sumpit, a blowgun and spear weapon in Maritime Southeast Asia
- Ligerian blowgun, a traditional blowgun in Loire, France theorized to descend from Mesoamerican blowguns brought back to Europe in the 15th or 16th centuries

== Sources ==
- IFA FAQ, English version (Japanese version here)
