= Sumpit =

Blowguns of Southeast Asia

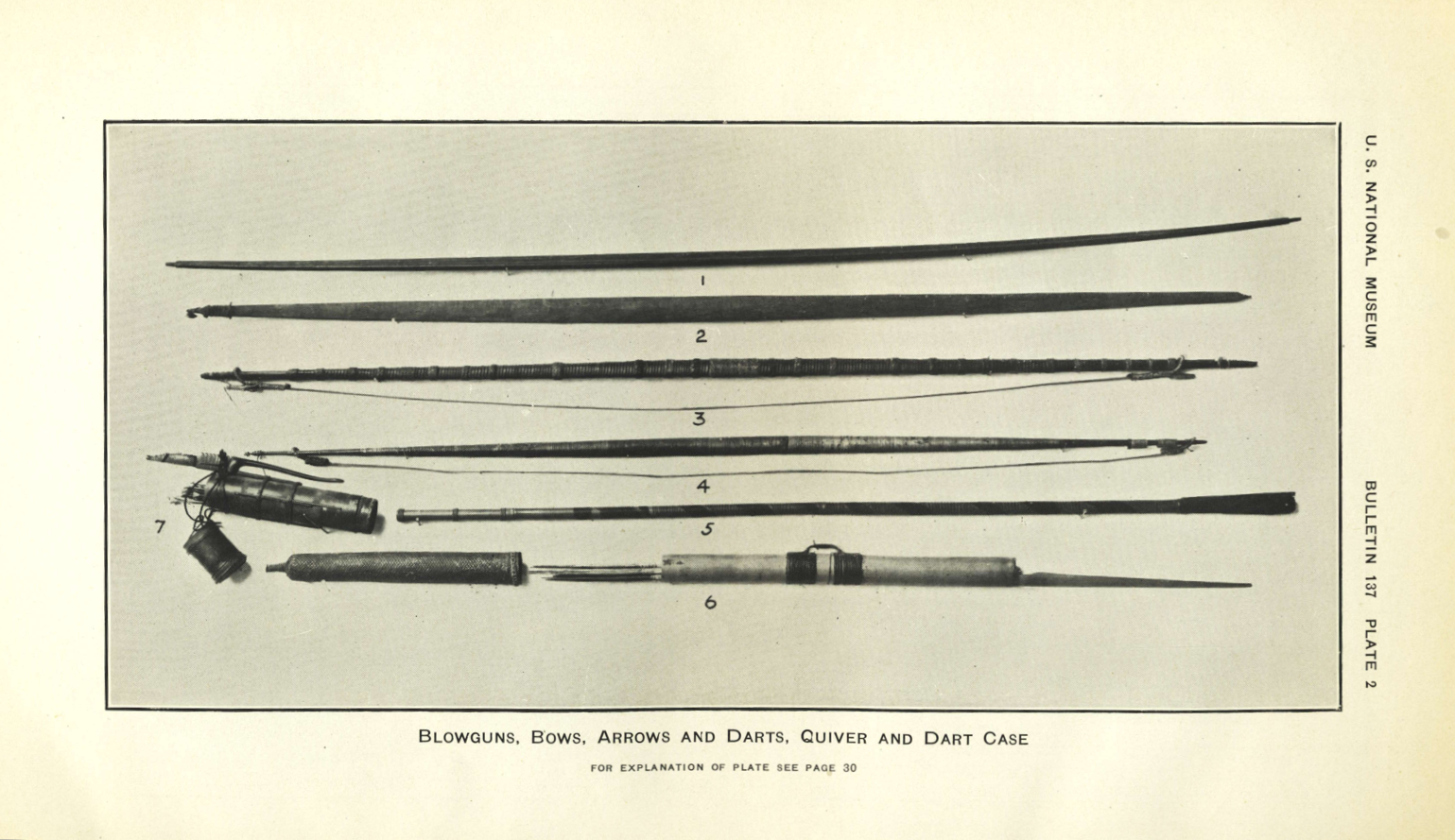
Sumpit (5) and dart quiver (6) from the Batak people of Palawan, Philippines (c. 1926)

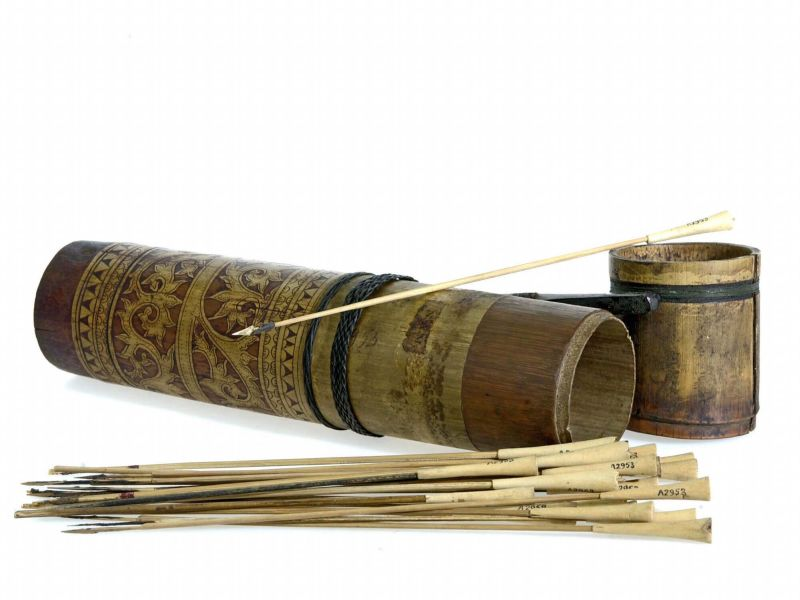
Sumpitan quiver and poison cup from the Dayak people of Sabah, Malaysia

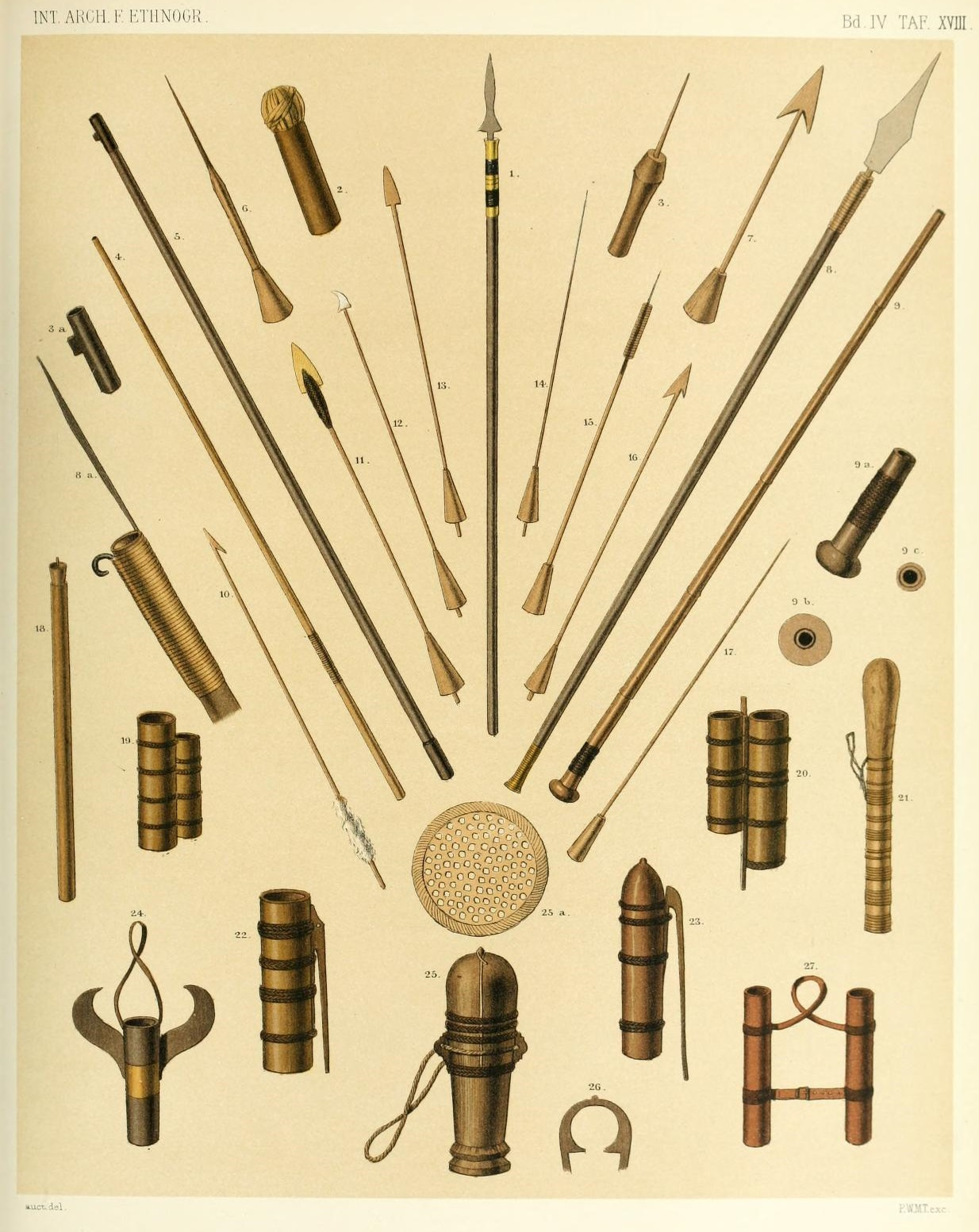
Illustration of various sumpitan from Indonesia (c. 1891)

Sumpit and sumpitan are general terms for blowguns, usually tipped with iron spearheads, used for hunting and warfare in the islands of the Philippines, Borneo, and Sulawesi. They were also known as zarbatana by the Spanish (Old Spanish variant of cerbatana, "lance").

== Description ==
Sumpit were generally made from bamboo, but they can also be made from wood. They were usually about 4 to 6 ft (1.2 to 1.8 m) in length and 2 to 3 cm (0.79 to 1.18 in) in diameter. They can be made from one piece or from two to three pieces joined. Sumpit used for war generally used thick wooden or palm leaf-rib darts. The blunt end of the dart is capped with a conical plug of soft cork-like wood or wrapped in feathers or plant fiber which is dipped in resin to form an airtight seal when loaded.

The darts are too short to cause serious physical injury, thus when used in war or hunting large animals, they are dipped in a cup of poison before being loaded. The poison is made from the concentrated sap of the Antiaris toxicaria tree (variously known as upas, apo, or ipoh). The sap contains the toxin antiarin which can cause convulsions and death by cardiac arrest, even if the darts only cause minor injuries. Animals killed by these poison darts are safe to eat.

War sumpit also typically have iron spearheads attached on one end which allowed their use as spears once their ammunition is exhausted, similar in function to a bayonet. Sumpit used for hunting birds can also use clay pellets as ammunition.

American observers in the Philippines in 1912 record that the sumpit has a maximum range of 150 to 180 ft (46 to 55 m).

The first written description of sumpit is from the accounts of Antonio Pigafetta in 1521, when he described the sumpit of the Palawan people of Palawan island.

"Those people of Polaoan go naked as do the others: almost all of them cultivate their fields. They have blowpipes with thick wooden arrows more than one palmo long, with harpoon points, and other tipped with fishbones, and poisoned with an herb; while others are tipped with points of bamboo like harpoon and are poisoned. At the end of the arrow they attach a little piece of softwood, instead of feathers. At the end of their blowpipes they fasten a bit of iron like a spearhead; and when they have shot all their arrows they fight with that."

— Antonio Pigafetta, Relazione del primo viaggio intorno al mondo (1524-1525)

Sumpit are traditional weapons of various ethnic groups in the Philippines, Borneo, and Sulawesi. The term is also used for toy blowguns in the Philippines.

== Gallery ==
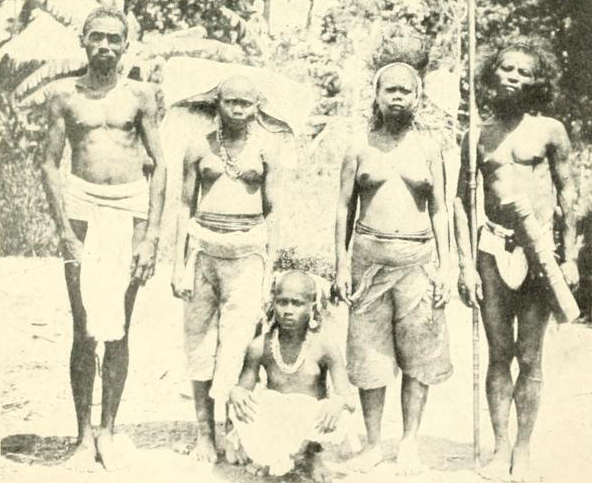
A group of Batak people from Palawan. The man on the far right is equipped with a sumpit and quiver. (c. 1913)

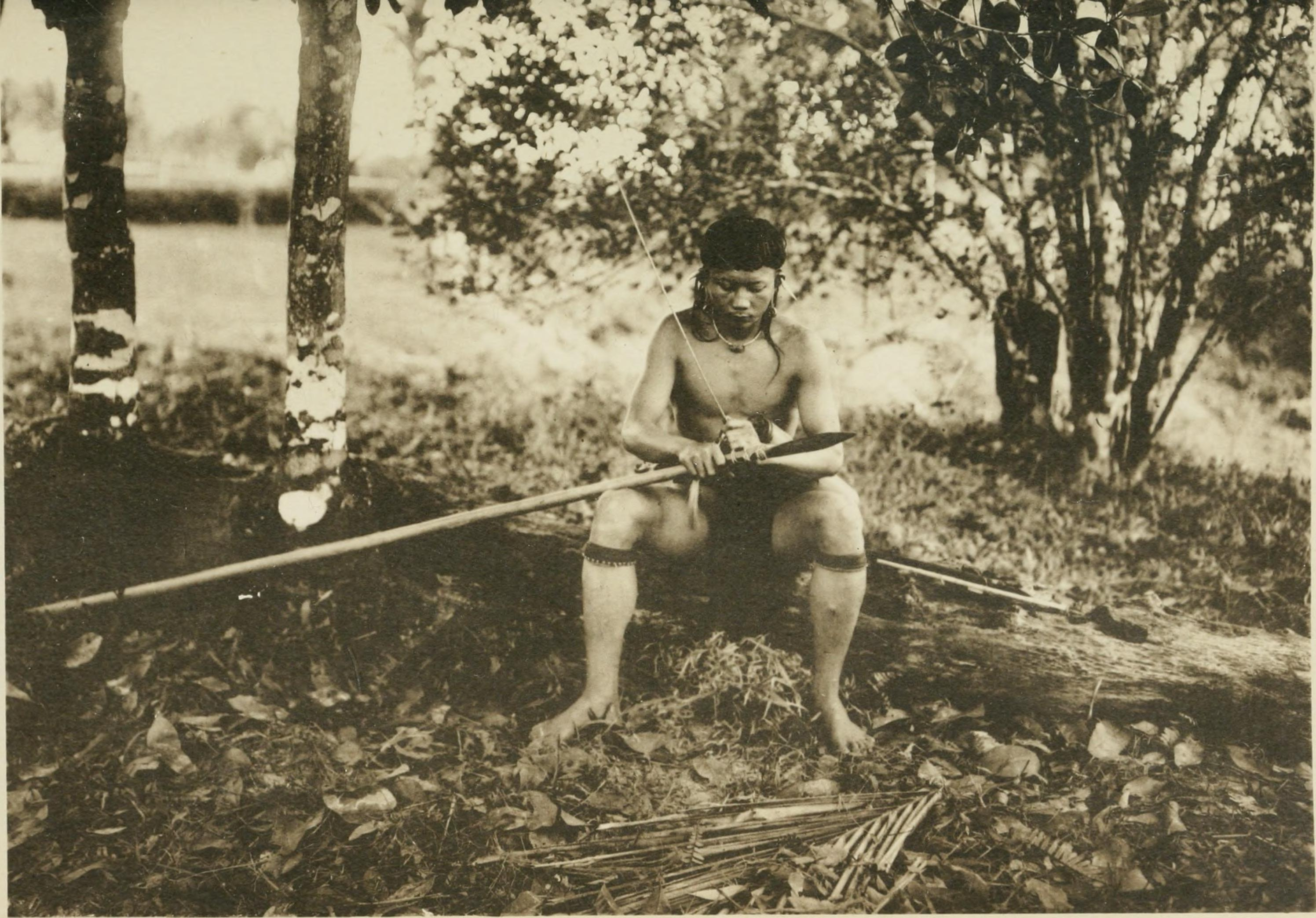
A Dayak man from Sabah, Malaysia tying a spearhead on a sumpitan (c. 1912)

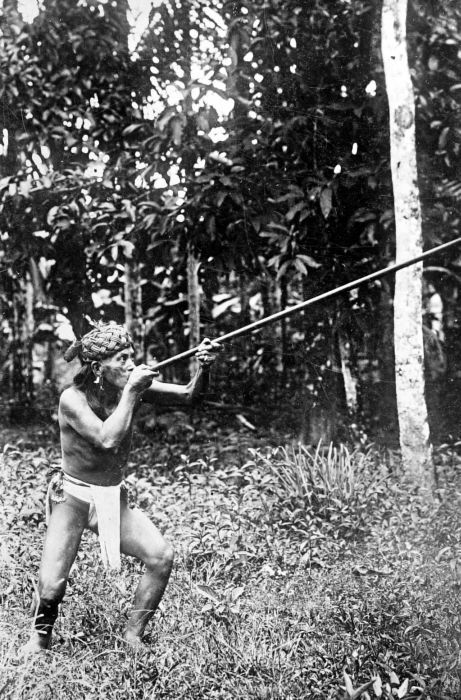
Dayak hunter with a sumpitan

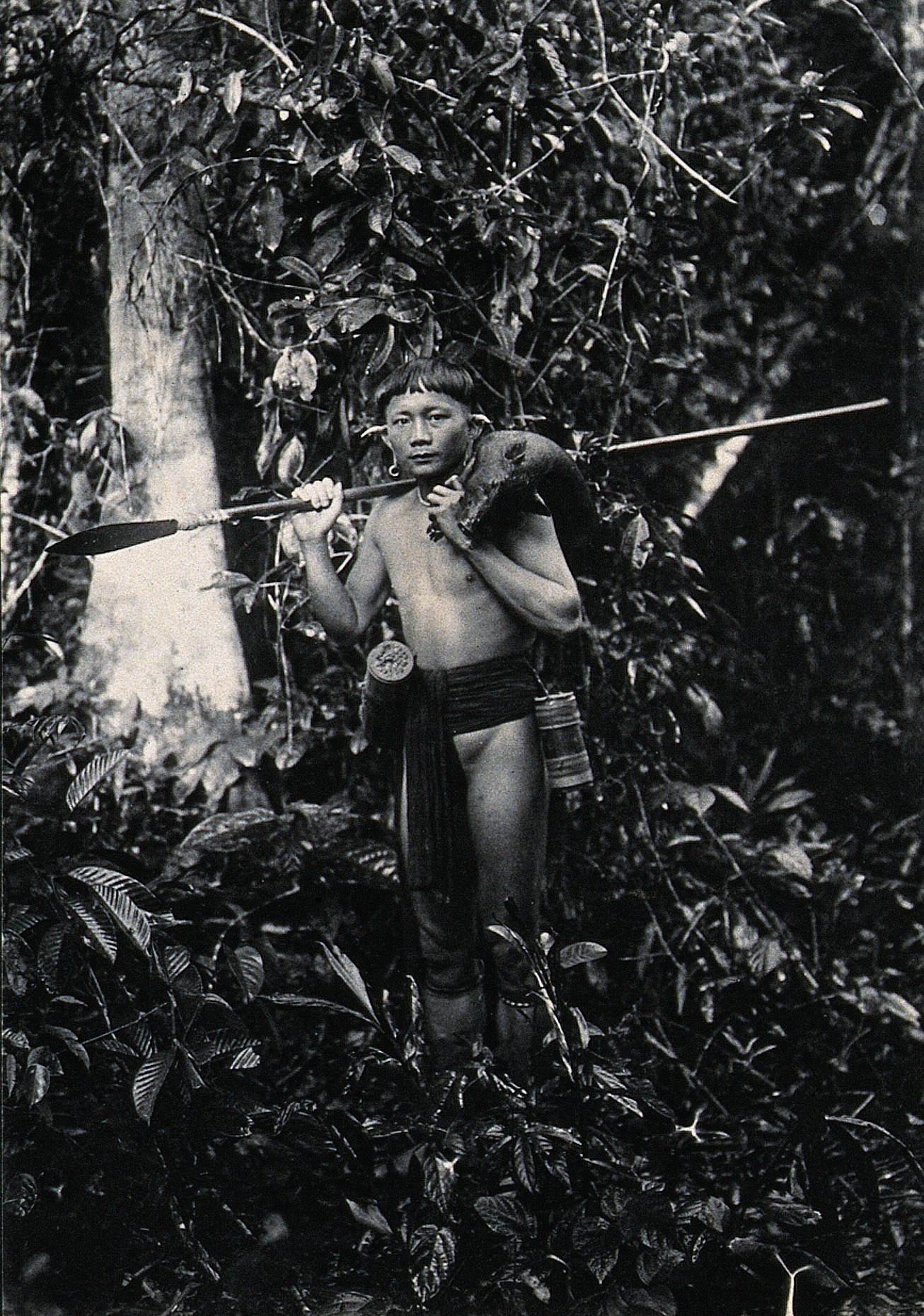
A Kenyah hunter with a blowgun from Sarawak, Malaysia

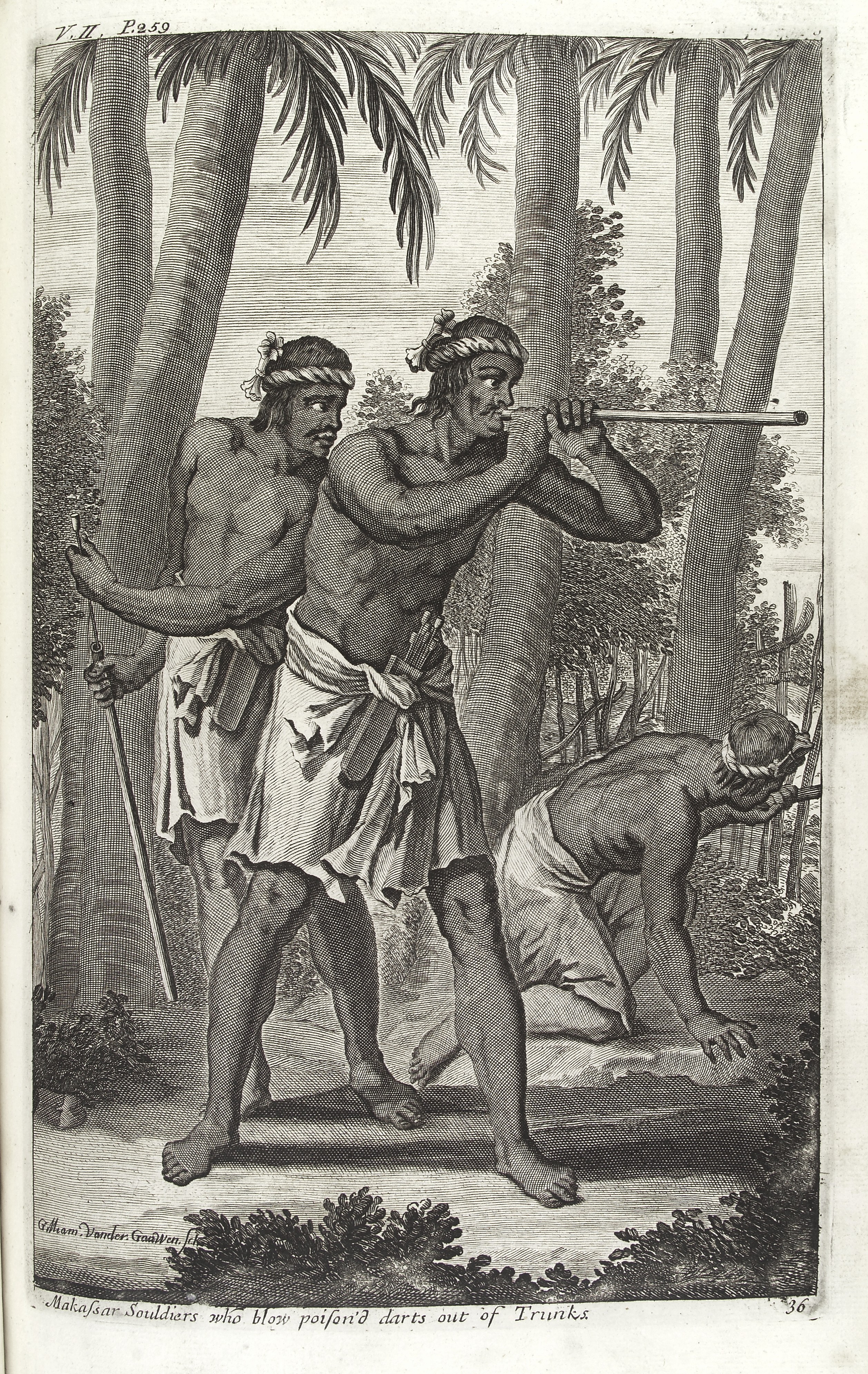
British illustration of Makassar warriors with blowguns (c. 1744–1746)

== See also ==
- Sibat
- Luthang
- Fire piston
- Fukiya
- Bayonet
