= Antiarin =

Antiarins
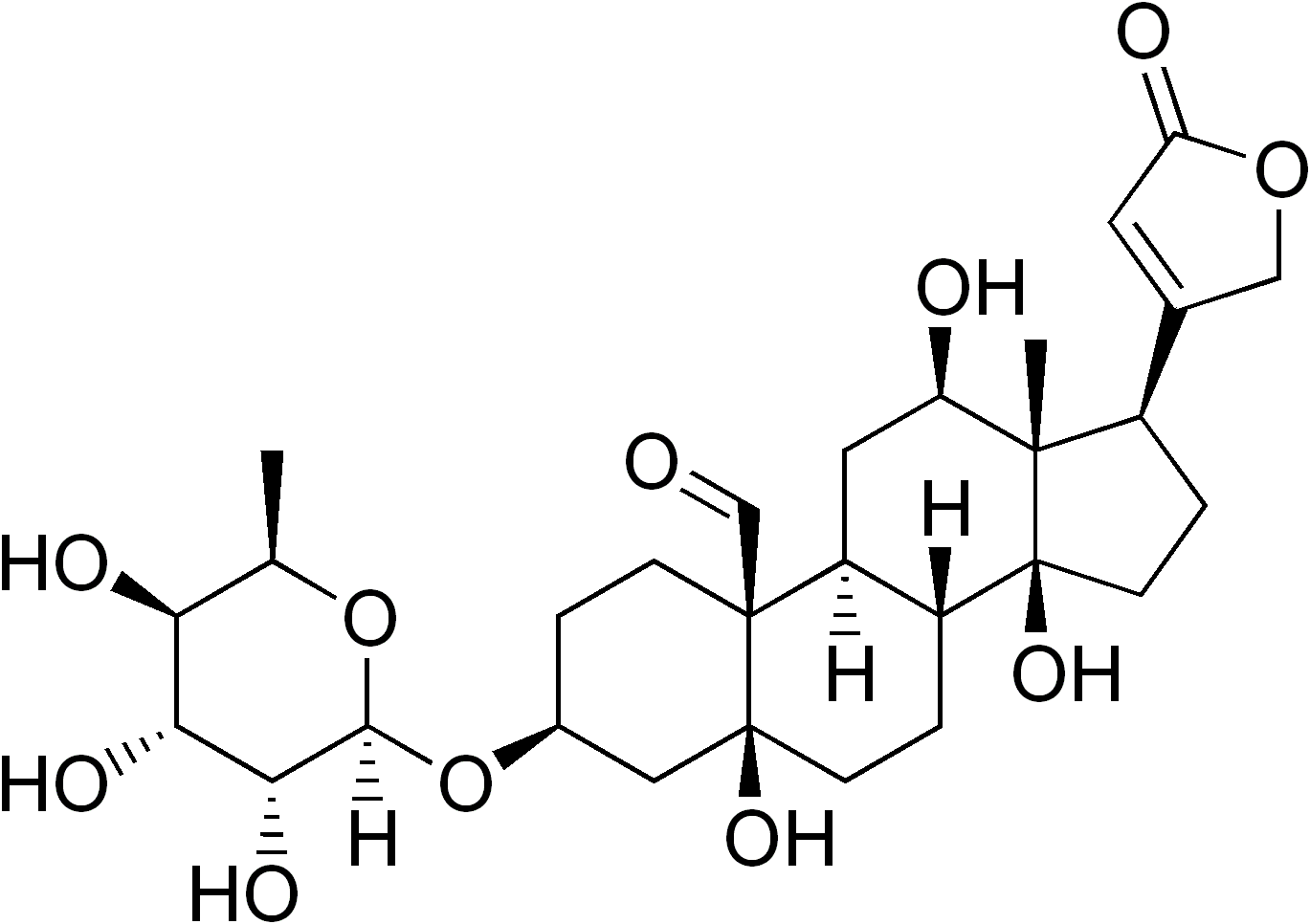
- α-Antiarin

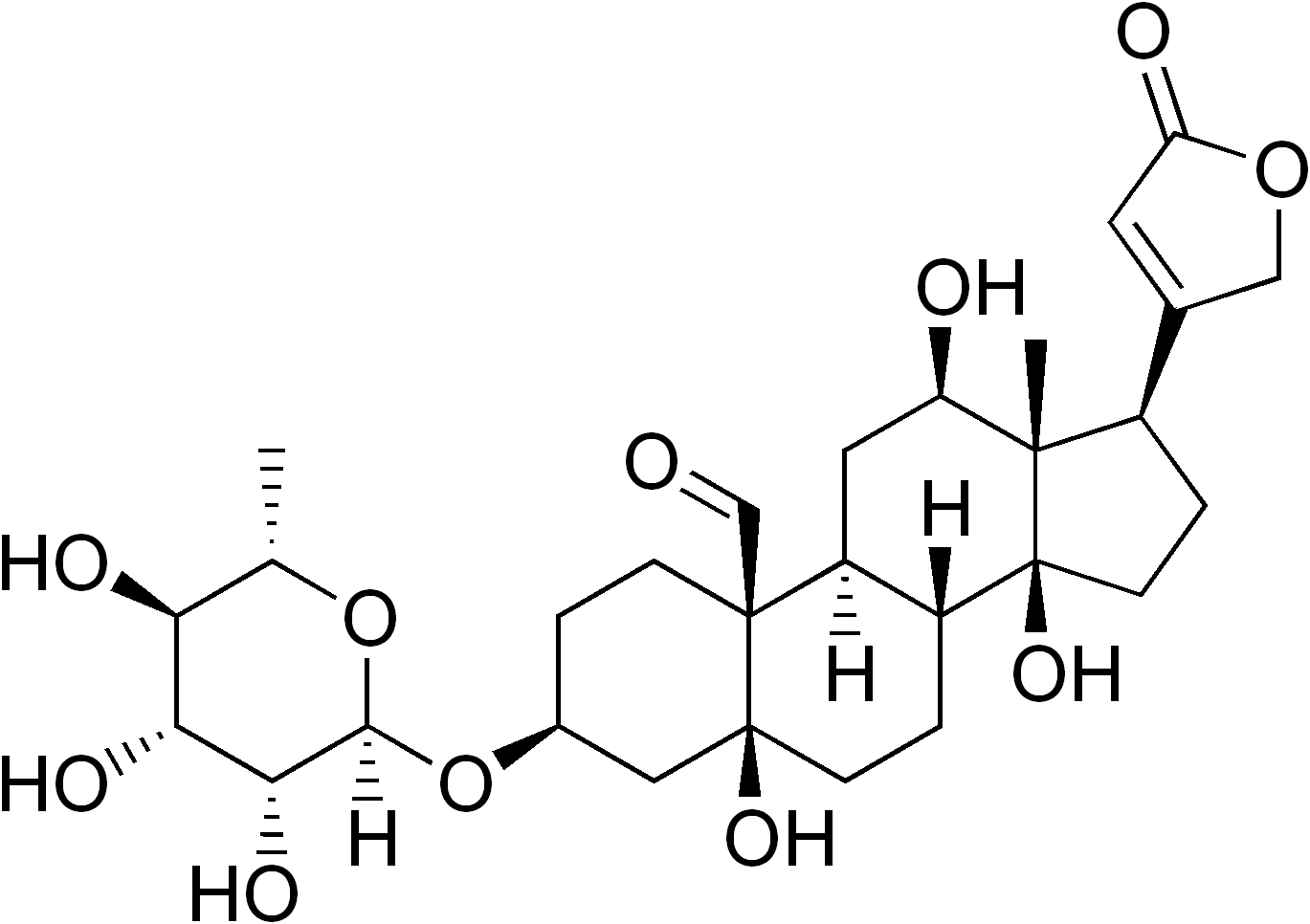
- β-Antiarin

Names
- IUPAC names α-Antiarin: (3S,5S,8R,9S,10S,12R,13S,14S,17R)-5,12,14-trihydroxy-13-methyl-17-(5-oxo-2H-furan-3-yl)-3-[(2R,3R,4R,5R,6R)-3,4,5-trihydroxy-6-methyloxan-2-yl]oxy-2,3,4,6,7,8,9,11,12,15,16,17-dodecahydro-1H-cyclopenta[a]phenanthrene-10-carbaldehyde β-Antiarin: (3S,5S,8R,9S,10S,12R,13S,14S,17R)-5,12,14-trihydroxy-13-methyl-17-(5-oxo-2H-furan-3-yl)-3-[(2R,3R,4R,5R,6S)-3,4,5-trihydroxy-6-methyloxan-2-yl]oxy-2,3,4,6,7,8,9,11,12,15,16,17-dodecahydro-1H-cyclopenta[a]phenanthrene-10-carbaldehyde
- Other names Antiarigenin rhamnoside

Identifiers
CAS Number	α: 23605-05-2; β: 639-13-4
3D model (JSmol)	Interactive image; α: Interactive image; β: Interactive image
ChEMBL	β: ChEMBL1075787
ChemSpider	β: 21477371
PubChem CID	α: 441842; β: 6325617
UNII	α: VPM8C16434; β: JI0QAN6VB0
- InChI: InChI=1/C29H42O11/c1-14-22(33)23(34)24(35)25(39-14)40-16-3-6-27(13-30)19-10-20(31)26(2)17(15-9-21(32)38-12-15)5-8-29(26,37)18(19)4-7-28(27,36)11-16/h9,13-14,16-20,22-25,31,33-37H,3-8,10-12H2,1-2H3/t14-,16+,17-,18-,19+,20-,22+,23-,24-,25+,26+,27+,28+,29+/m1/s1 Key: MFIXZHBJWSBQJA-OZQKXHGLBU; α: InChI=1S/C29H42O11/c1-14-22(33)23(34)24(35)25(39-14)40-16-3-6-27(13-30)19-10-20(31)26(2)17(15-9-21(32)38-12-15)5-8-29(26,37)18(19)4-7-28(27,36)11-16/h9,13-14,16-20,22-25,31,33-37H,3-8,10-12H2,1-2H3/t14-,16+,17-,18-,19+,20-,22+,23-,24-,25+,26+,27+,28+,29+/m1/s1 Key: MFIXZHBJWSBQJA-OZQKXHGLSA-N; β: InChI=1S/C29H42O11/c1-14-22(33)23(34)24(35)25(39-14)40-16-3-6-27(13-30)19-10-20(31)26(2)17(15-9-21(32)38-12-15)5-8-29(26,37)18(19)4-7-28(27,36)11-16/h9,13-14,16-20,22-25,31,33-37H,3-8,10-12H2,1-2H3/t14-,16-,17+,18+,19-,20+,22-,23+,24+,25-,26-,27-,28-,29-/m0/s1 Key: MFIXZHBJWSBQJA-KRRSKSLRSA-N
- SMILES: O=C\1OC/C(=C/1)[C@H]2CC[C@@]6(O)[C@]2(C)[C@H](O)C[C@H]4[C@H]6CC[C@]5(O)C[C@@H](O[C@@H]3O[C@@H]([C@H](O)[C@@H](O)[C@H]3O)C)CC[C@]45C=O; α: C[C@@H]1[C@@H]([C@H]([C@H]([C@@H](O1)O[C@H]2CC[C@@]3([C@H]4C[C@H]([C@@]5([C@H](CC[C@@]5([C@@H]4CC[C@@]3(C2)O)O)C6=CC(=O)OC6)C)O)C=O)O)O)O; β: C[C@H]1[C@@H]([C@H]([C@H]([C@@H](O1)O[C@H]2CC[C@@]3([C@H]4C[C@H]([C@@]5([C@H](CC[C@@]5([C@@H]4CC[C@@]3(C2)O)O)C6=CC(=O)OC6)C)O)C=O)O)O)O

Properties
Chemical formula	C_{29}H_{42}O_{11}
Molar mass	566.644 g·mol^{−1}
- Except where otherwise noted, data are given for materials in their standard state (at 25 °C [77 °F], 100 kPa). verify (what is ?) Infobox references

Antiarins are cardiac glycoside poisons produced by the upas tree (Antiaris toxicaria). There are two closely related forms, α-antiarin and β-antiarin. The two share the same aglycone, antiarigenin, but differ in the sugar group that is attached to it.

== α-Antiarin ==
α-Antiarin is a crystalline solid with a melting point of 242-242.5 °C. The sugar portion of α-antiarin is antiarose (D-gulomethylose).

In addition to being present in the sap of the upas tree, it is also found in the latex of Naucleopsis mello-barretoi.

== β-Antiarin ==
Is a crystalline solid with a melting point of 233-240 °C. The sugar portion of β-antiarin is L-rhamnose.

The uses of β-antiarin range from medical use, such as hypertension treatment, to arrow poison application. It also proves to be more poisonous than curare, sporting a low LD_{50} of 0.1 mg/kg in most mammals.

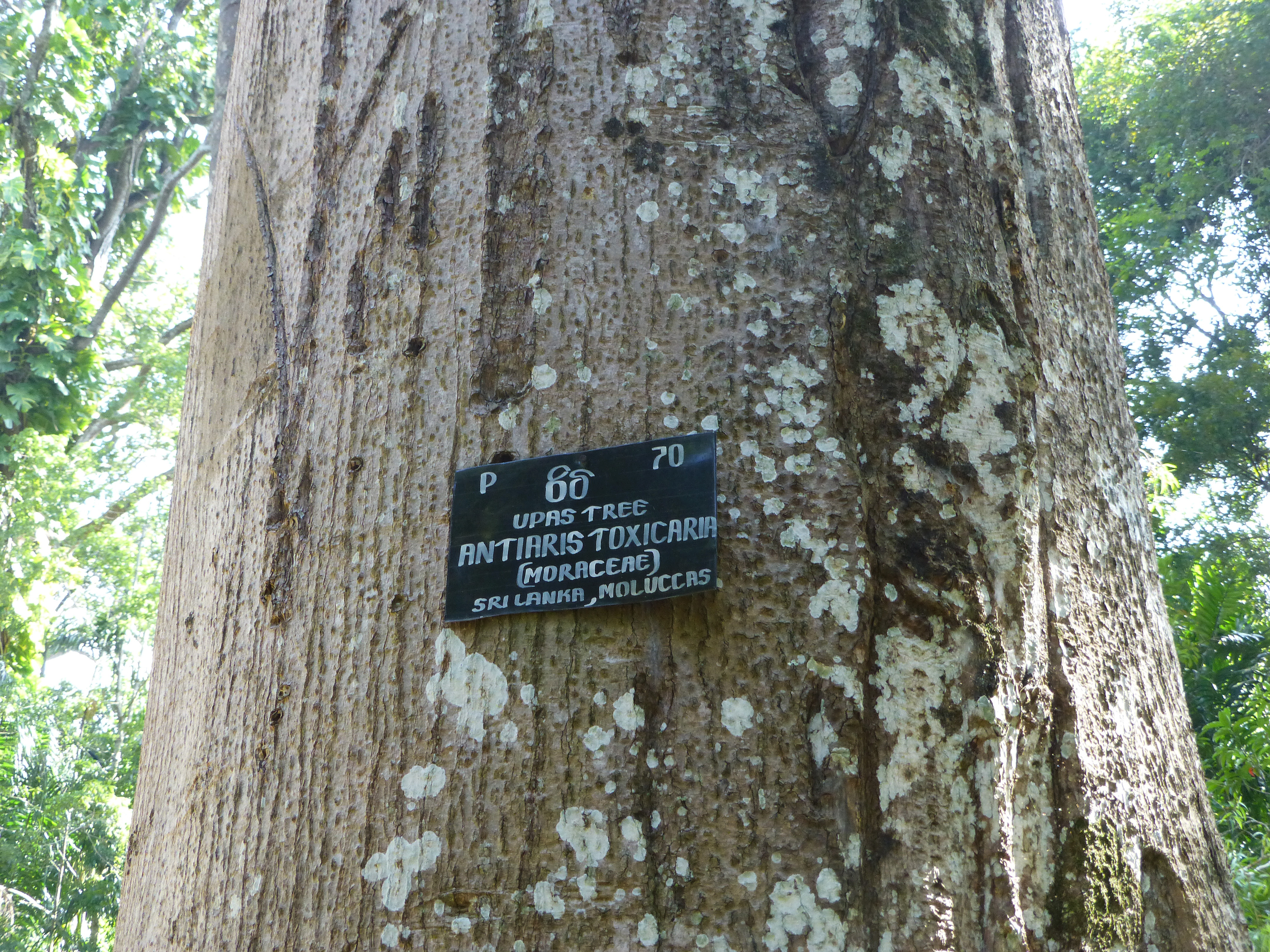
Antiaris toxicaria in Jardin Botanique de Kandy

=== Symptoms of β-antiarin poisoning ===
Upon β-antiarin poisoning, when observed in animals such as frogs and small mammals, visible symptoms include muscle spasms — particularly of the head and neck — and excess defecation. Paralysis can also be presented before death. The primary physiological system affected is the cardiac muscle, though gastro-intestinal tissue has also been known to be severely affected by this type of poisoning. Convulsions and spasms are not immediate, especially when the chemical is too diluted in water. In animal tests, time of death resulted anywhere from 5–30 minutes after administration. When used as an arrow poison, β-antiarin produces twitches in the target, which then become full convulsions, unconsciousness, and final death through cardiac arrest.

=== Toxicity of β-antiarin ===
During tests performed on frogs and mammals, it was found that the minimum lethal dose for an amphibian was 1/300th mg. For a 300-400 g guinea pig, this lethal dose increased to 0.75 mg. Lethal dose for felines is 0.094 mg/kg, using intravenous injection. Meanwhile, 1 mg will kill a dog.

=== Physiological systems affected/medical properties ===
β-Antiarin is administered to the body through injection. Once inside the body, the chemical will affect muscular and cardiac tissues. A heart attack occurs because β-antiarin affects Na+K+-ATPase cardiac-muscle membrane activity.

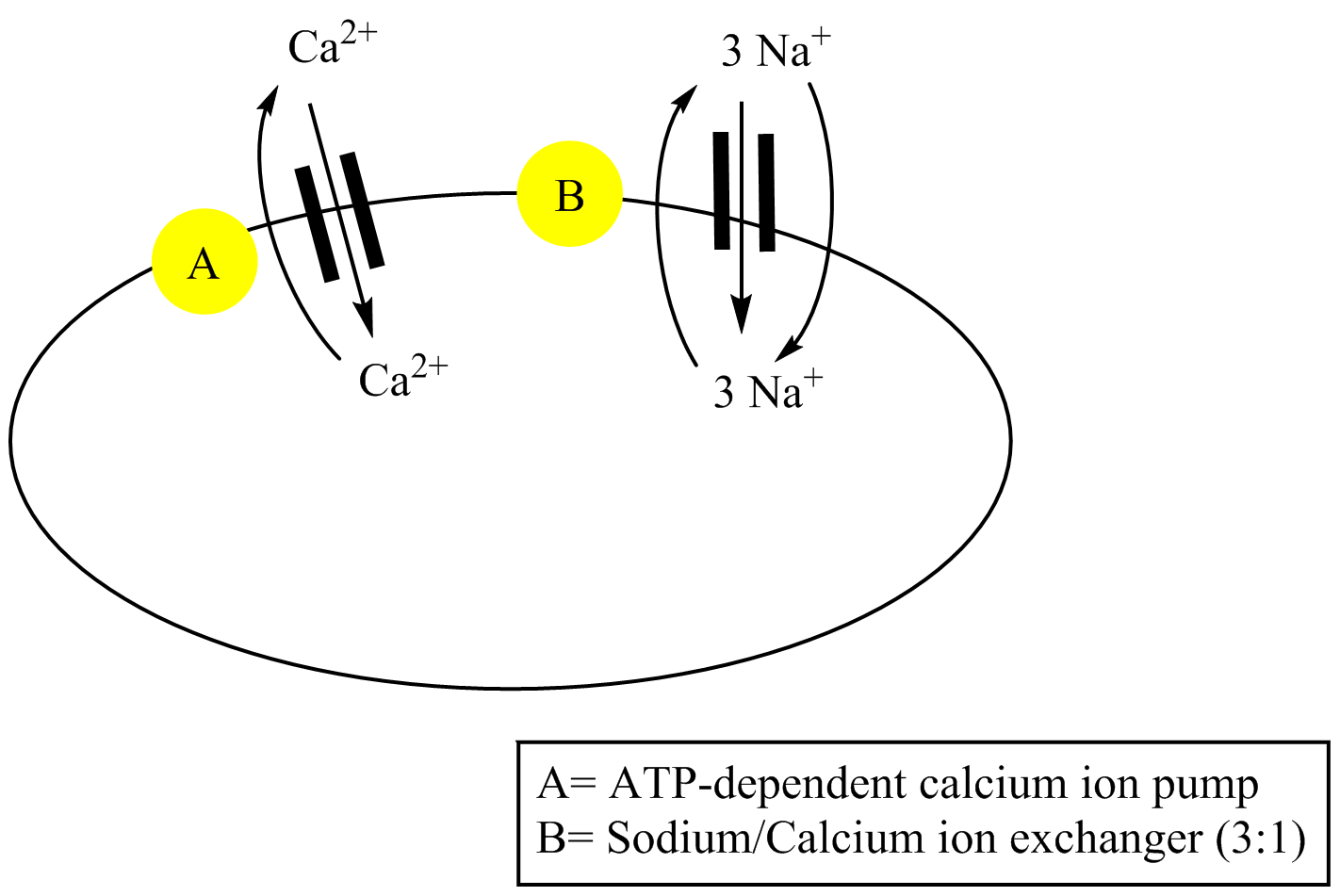
Sodium calcium pump

However, the very effect that allows β-antiarin to be a poison also gives it medicinal properties. It limits the sodium ion (Na^{+}) concentration by blocking the Na^{+} pump, which then promotes calcium ions (Ca^{2+}) to increase in concentration in the extracellular cardiac muscle domain, therein permitting the heart to contract. The mechanism through which sodium and calcium ions are exchanged, known as the sodium-calcium exchanger (NCX), allows for the exchange of ions to occur at a rate of 3:1 respectively. The cardiac cell exhibits a positive potential during ventricular systole, becomes depolarized, and permits calcium ions to rush in by the NCX. From here, the contraction occurs when the calcium ions leave and the cell re-polarizes. If the dosage of cardiac glycoside (i.e. β-antiarin) doubles, then the substance becomes a poison.

== Cultural references ==
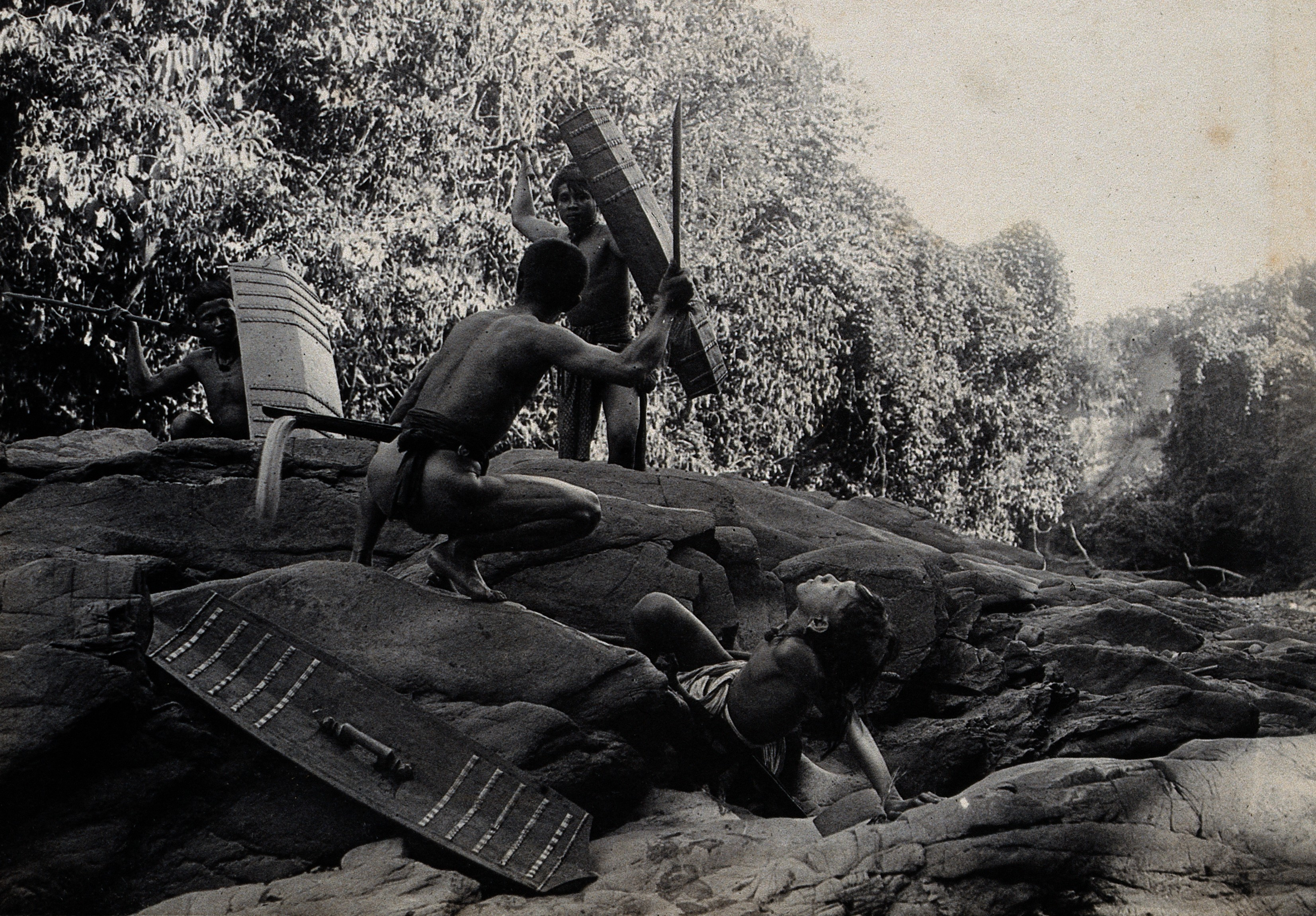
Four Dayak tribesmen in a warfare ritual

The earliest known use of antiarins as an arrow poison was with the Li people in China, circa 581. Other cultures, such as the peoples of the Dayak tribe, Berusu, Punan, and Basap in Borneo, southeast Asia, have also used the sap of the upas tree for poisoned darts. Indigenous people would collect the sap in a bamboo fixture (or upas leaf if amount needed is small), then place over an open flame for a week. Extreme care was taken to make sure the sap does not boil over; to make sure the poison was not lost, small taste tests would be performed as the sap continues to be dehydrated. A sweet taste would indicate that the sugar group in β-antiarin had cleaved, thus ruining the potency of the poison and freeing the sugar into the sap. Final poisonous sap would be a dark black, metallic color and have a bitter taste; this is usually achieved at the end of seven days. The sap can then be used to coat the arrow tips, and its potency continues to be effective for years as long as care is taken to make sure the tip is not re-exposed to heat. Even hardened, stored poison could still be lethal when reconstructed with the root sap of Derris elliptica, strychnos, or snake poison. The arrows could be used for hunting as well as defense; if the tissue surrounding the arrowhead was cut off and the meat cooked, the poison's sugar group would break off, rendering it harmless.
