= Blowgun =

Tube for firing light projectiles or darts

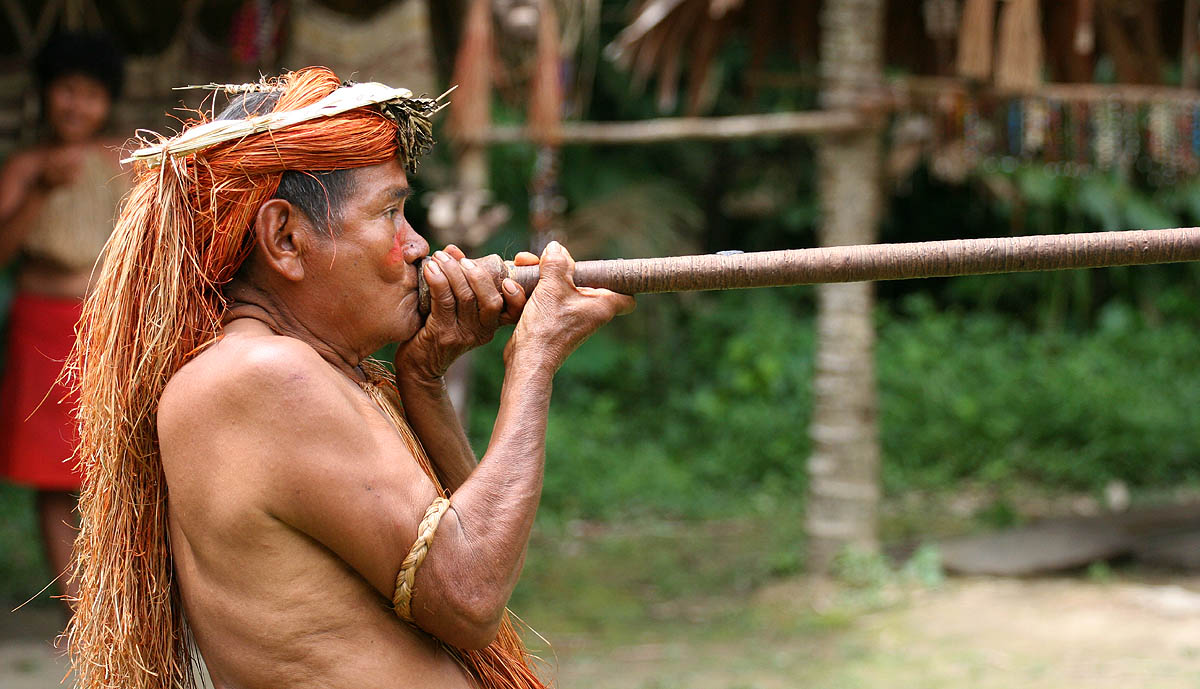
Demonstration of a blowgun by a Yagua hunter

A blowgun (also called a blowpipe or blow tube) is a simple ranged weapon consisting of a long narrow tube for shooting light projectiles such as darts. It operates by having the projectile placed inside the pipe and using the force created by forced exhalation ("blow") to pneumatically propel the projectile. The propulsive power is limited by the strength of the user's respiratory muscles and the vital capacity of their lungs.

== History ==
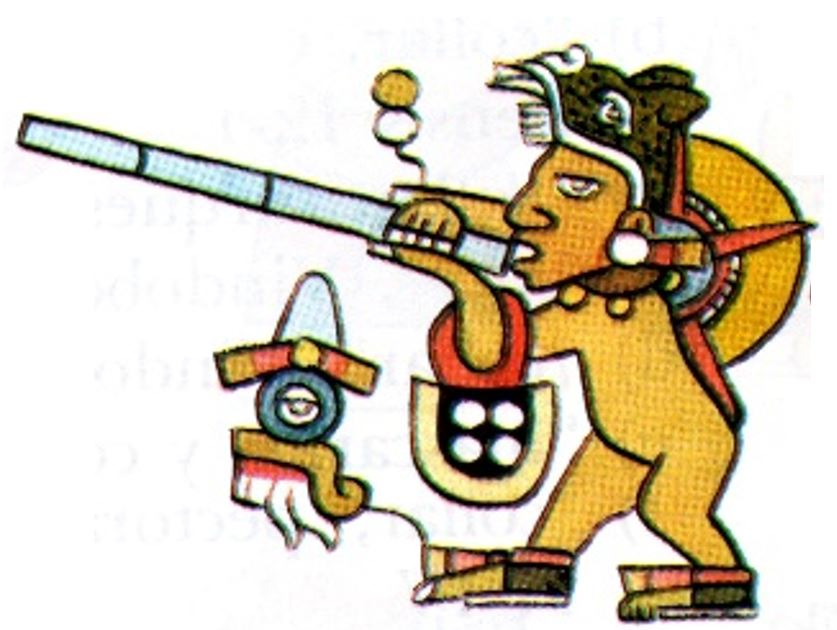
Mixtec blowgun Tlacalhuazcuahuitl depicted in the Codex Bodley

Many cultures have used such a weapon, but various indigenous and aboriginal peoples of East Asia, Southeast Asia, Western Europe, North America, Central America (the Huehuetenango region of Guatemala), and South America (the Amazon Basin and the Guianas) are best known for its historical usage.

Projectiles include seeds, clay pellets, and darts. Some cultures dip the tip of the darts in curare or other arrow poisons in order to paralyze the target. Blowguns were very rarely used by these tribes as anti-personnel weapons, but primarily to hunt small animals such as monkeys and birds. The North American Cherokee were known for making blowguns from river cane to supplement their diet with rabbits and other small creatures. The Choctaw Indians of North America also made use of cane blowguns to hunt squirrel and birds.

Blowguns are depicted in paintings on pre-Columbian pottery and are mentioned in many Mesoamerican myths. Back then and today, the Maya use a blowgun to hunt birds and small animals with spherical dry seeds and clay pellets. The clay ammunition is made slightly larger than needed (to allow for shrinkage and refinement) and stored in a shoulderbag. The outside of the dry clay pellet is shaved off and burnished right before use.

Shorter blowguns and smaller bore darts were used for varmint hunting by pre-adolescent boys in traditional Cherokee villages. They used the blowguns to reduce the population of small rodents such as rats, mice, chipmunks and other mammals that cut or gnaw into food caches, seed and vegetable stores, or that are attracted to the planted vegetables. While this custom gave the boys something to do around the village and kept them out of mischief, it also worked as an early form of pest control. Some food was also obtained by the boys, who hunted squirrels with blowguns well into the 20th century.

Today blowguns are primarily used by to deliver darts containing sedatives, antibiotics, or vaccines to dangerous animals. Herpetologists use blowguns to capture elusive lizards with sedative-filled darts. Blowguns are also used recreationally, with either darts or paintballs.

== Sport blowgun ==
There are several competition styles practised around the world. A standardization of competition style, based upon fukiya, is being pursued by the International Fukiyado Association and hopes to become an Olympic event. It is a 10-metre (33 ft) target shooting, using a standardized length 120 cm or 48 inch, and barrel caliber, dart shape, length and weight are free. In each round the shooter shoots 5 darts and there are 6 rounds per game, for a total of 30 darts. The target faces are 7 (6 cm), 5 (12 cm), 3 (18 cm) points. The bullseye is 160 cm or 63 inches above the floor.

Two other styles are also being pursued to make up the Olympic blowgun event, both based upon the Cherokee Annual Gathering Blowgun Competition. The Field Style competition is similar to the winter Biathlon, where the shooter runs from a starting line to a target lane, shoots and retrieves the darts, and continues to the next station. The course length varies from 400 to 800 m (440 to 870 yd) or longer, with from 9 to 16 targets at various heights and shooting distances. The final style is the Long Distance target shoot. The target is a circle of 24 cm (9 in) diameter, and the firing line is 20 m (66 ft) away. Three darts are fired by each shooter, at least one of which must stick in the target. All successful shooters move to the next round, moving back 2 m (6.6 ft) each time.

The sport blowgun competition is managed by the International Fukiyado Association, with which national associations in the United States, France, Germany, and the Philippines are affiliated.

== Gallery ==
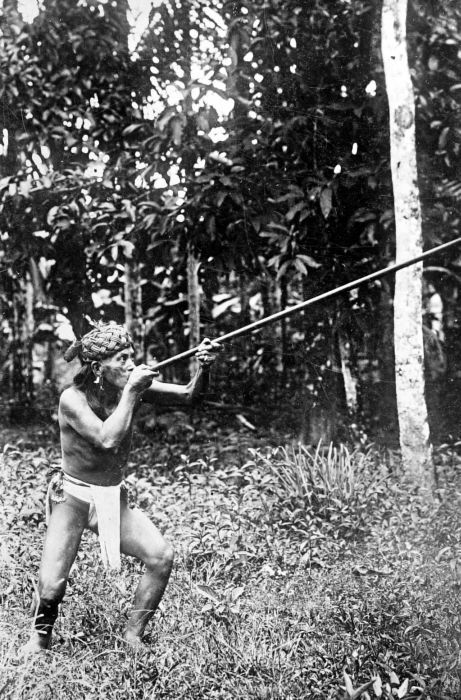
A Dayak man using a blowgun
(Dutch East Indies, c.1920)

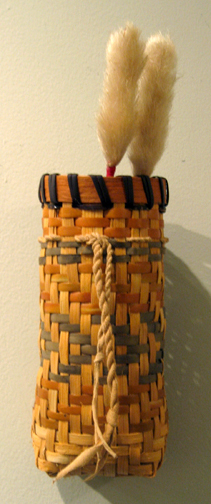
Rivercane quiver with blowgun darts, fletched with bull thistle

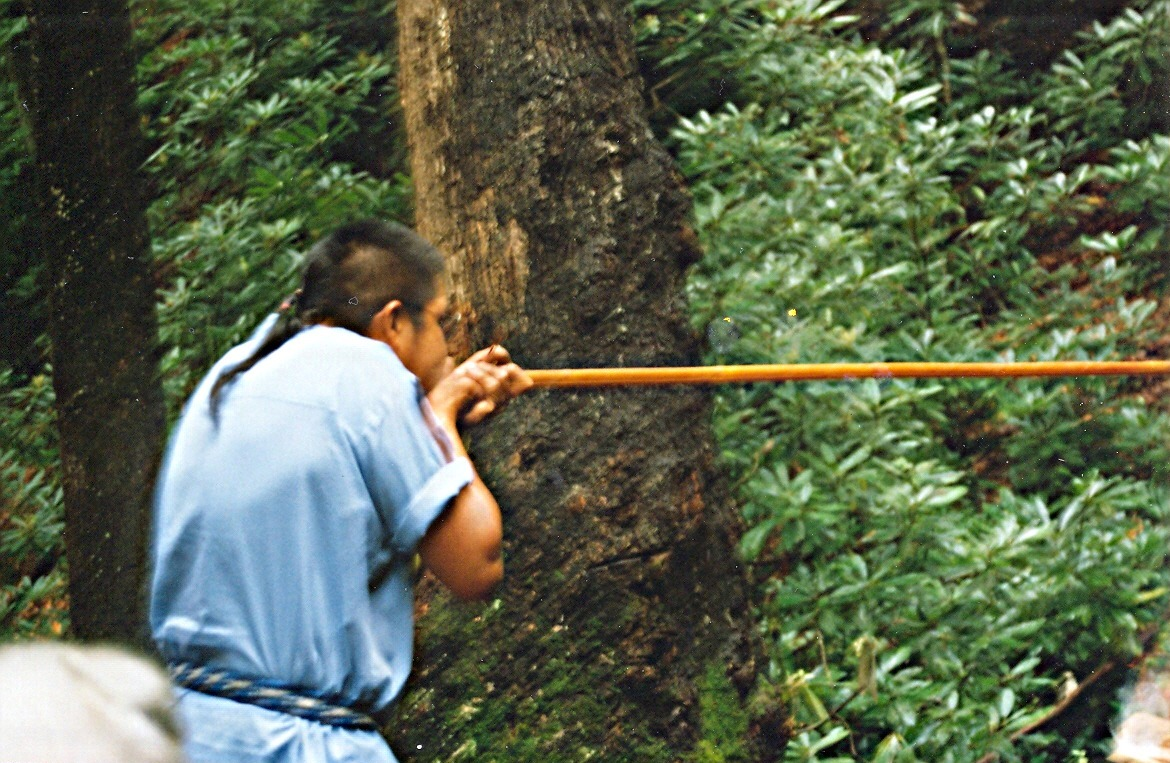
Demonstration of Eastern Cherokee blowgun in Oconaluftee Indian Village, Cherokee, North Carolina

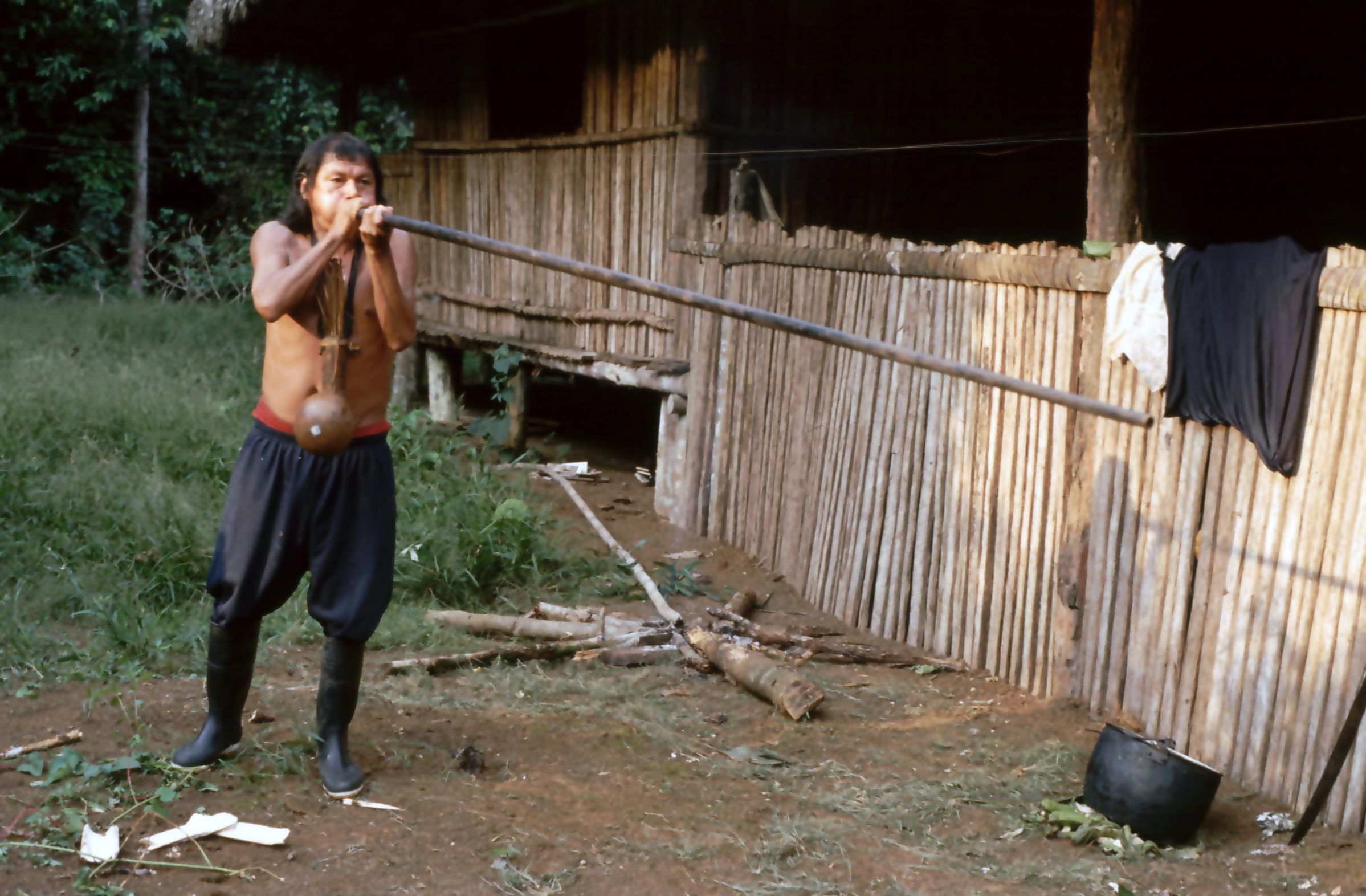
An Achuar man with a blowgun, Ecuador

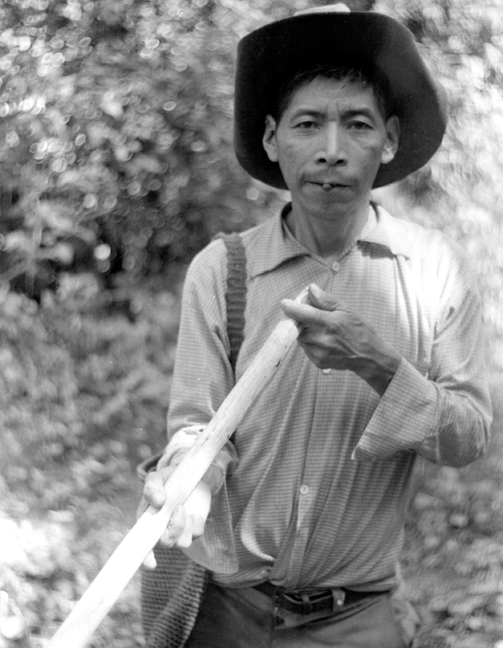
A Jakaltek Maya holds a clay pellet between his lips as he prepares to insert it into his blowgun in Guatemala.

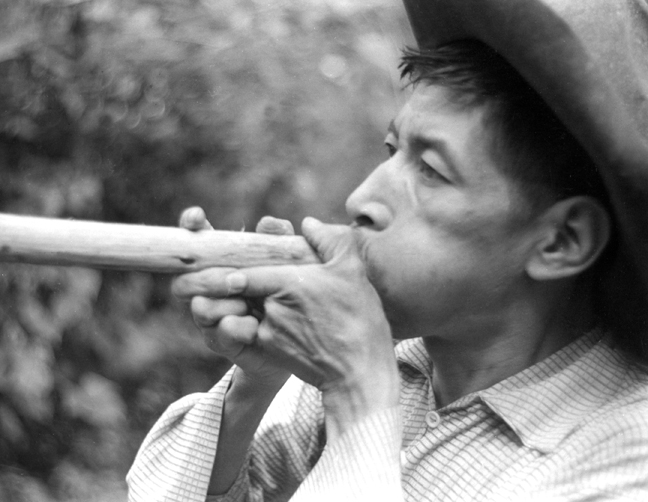
A Jakaltek Maya hunter aims at the eye of his target and then blows a clay pellet towards it.

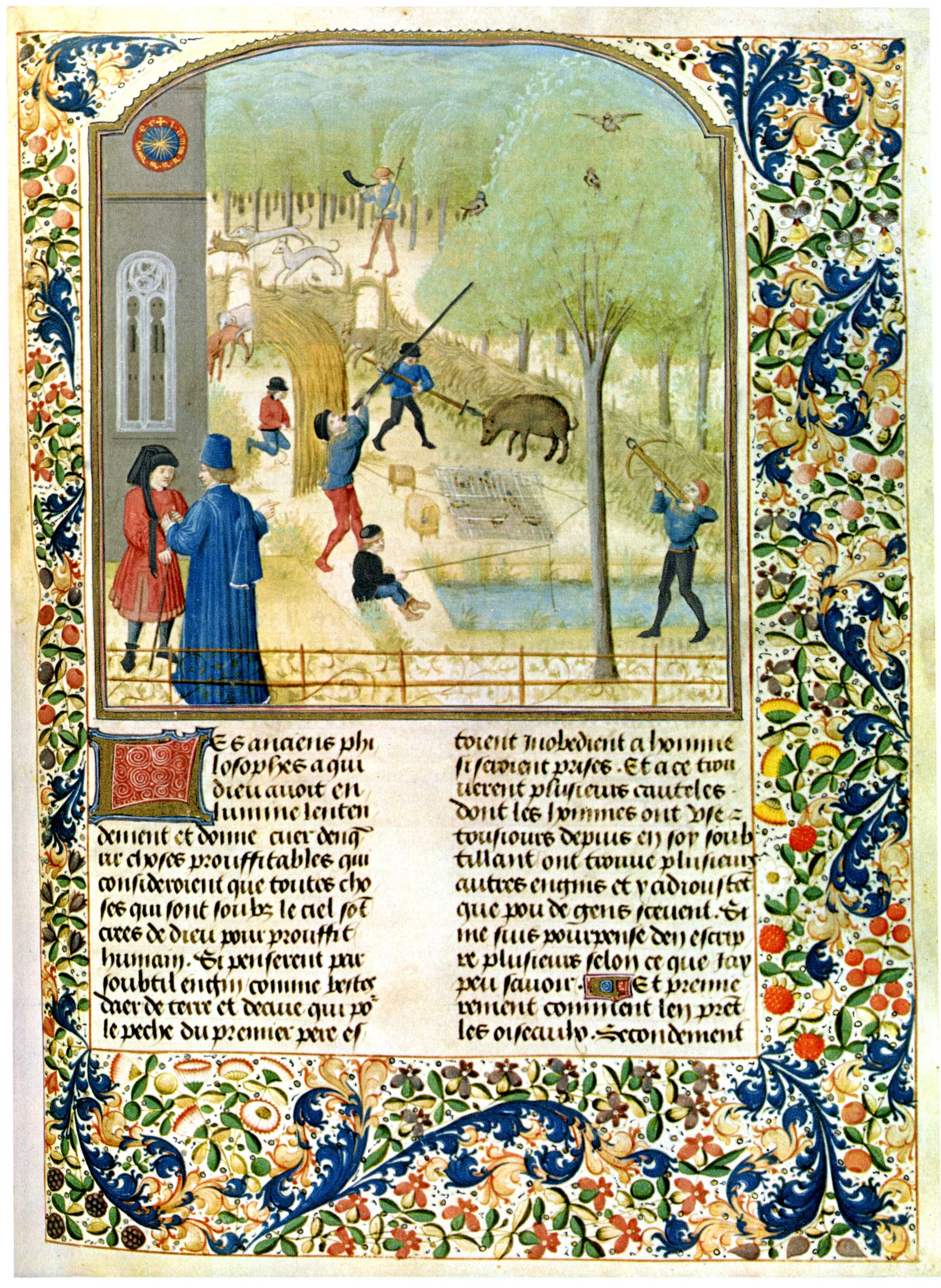
Illustration c. 1480 of medieval Europeans using a blowgun to hunt birds.

== Materials ==
Darts are typically made of hardwoods to prevent cracking, although bamboo skewers can be used informally. The dart's fletch can be made of many materials, such as down, feather tips, and animal fur. Modern materials, such as aluminium or carbon-reinforced plastic, are also used.

In Japan, competition darts are made of cellophane rolled into a cone (Fukiya), topped with a non-pointed brass brad. The Japan Sports Fukiya Association JSFA has privatized the sport, and all materials must be purchased from them. International Fukiya Association IFA chairman H.Higuchi promotes worldwide blowgun rule cooperating with other countries.

In other nations, modified piano wire is used to make the 0.40 in (10 mm) cal and 0.50 in (13 mm) cal darts, with certain manufacturers making specialty darts for odd sized or larger caliber barrels (0.35 in [9 mm] cal, 0.625 in [16 mm] cal, 0.68 in [17 mm] cal, and 0.75 in [19 mm] cal).

Use of home-made darts in the larger sizes or for hunting is common, utilizing bamboo skewers (3 and 6 mm or 1/8 and 1/4 in diameter), wire coat hangers, and even nails or knitting needles.

== Specifications ==
As a primitive weapon, there are no set dimension for a blowgun's length and diameter. However, generally there are several sizes:

1. Fukidake — diameter is 13 mm (0.51 in) cal in Japan. Tournament length is 120 cm (47 in), but for practice one can use a 50 cm (20 in) tube. No mouthpiece is used; users wrap their lips around the tube. International versions can be slightly more flexible, allowing a tube of 122 cm (4 ft) and 13 mm (0.50 in) cal under IFA rules. Darts consist of a paper cone 20 cm (8 in) long, weighing 0.8 g (3/100 oz).
2. Cherokee – made of river cane, 2 to 3 m (6 to 9 ft). Dart is 15 to 56 cm (6 to 22 in) long and made of locustwood or other available hardwoods such as oak, ash, maple, walnut, etc., fletched with thistle down or rabbit fur, that provides an air seal.
3. Jakaltek — wooden blowgun averages 1 m (3 ft) long with a sight placed 30 cm (12 in) from the end. Clay pellets are the most common type of ammunition and clay is sometimes added under the sight when the diameter of the blowgun is too thin for more stability and a better aim.
4. Modern (US/EU) — typically has a diameter of 0.40 in (10 mm) cal, however, both the 0.50 in (13 mm) cal and 0.625 in (16 mm) cal are admitted for competitive shooting, with restrictions on barrel length and darts dimensions/weight; with varying lengths having distance restrictions imposed. Bell-shaped mouthpiece. Standard length limited to 121 cm (48 in) in IFA sanctioned competition.
5. Paintball marker — made to be identical to the size of a 0.68 in (17 mm) cal paintball.
6. Sumpit — usually about 1.2 to 1.8 m (4 to 6 ft) in length and 2 to 3 cm (0.79 to 1.18 in) in diameter. It is made from bamboo or wood, and can be a single piece or two to three pieces joined. Metal spearheads are uniquely commonly affixed at the tip, allowing them to also be used as stabbing weapons. They use thick short darts with soft cork plugs or resin-coated feathers or fibers at the blunt end. Bird-hunting versions can use clay pellets.

== Legality ==
A law passed in Guatemala in the 1930s outlawed the use of the blowgun in an effort to protect small game. It was difficult to enforce in rural areas, but was one of the reasons for the decline of blowgun use in Guatemala.

In the United Kingdom under the Criminal Justice Act 1988, and in Australia, the blowgun is categorized as an offensive weapon, and as such it is illegal to manufacture, sell or hire or offer for sale or hire, expose or have in one's possession for the purpose of sale or hire, or lend or give to any other person. Antique blowguns are, however, exempt.

In Canada, the blowgun is classified as a prohibited weapon and is defined as any device that "being a tube or pipe designed for the purpose of shooting arrows or darts by the breath". Any imported blowgun must be deactivated by either drilling a hole or by blocking.

In the Republic of Ireland, blowpipes (blow guns) are classified as illegal offensive weapons.

In the U.S. state of California, blowguns are illegal. They are also illegal in Massachusetts and Washington, D.C., but are legal elsewhere. There is currently no age requirement for using a blowgun.

== Poisoned darts ==
Shooting darts with a blowgun is an extremely stealthy, and even lethal, hunting technique if the darts are poisoned with plant extracts or animal secretions. In Guyana, Suriname, French Guiana, some isolated areas in South America, and in the Amazon and Orinoco basins, blowgun hunters fill the tips of their darts with curare. The explorer Joseph Gumilla first mentioned the use of this poison. In ancient literature, it is also referred to as uiraêry, uirary, uraré, woorara, and wourali.

The Ticuas, an ethnic group from Brazil, Colombia, and Peru, produce a type of curare called Ticuna. This poison acts quickly on the prey, killing birds like the toucan in a matter of three to four minutes and small monkeys in about eight to ten minutes.

In the Orinoco basin, the blowgun and curare are used by: the Hoti, who make blowguns that are unique in their components; the Panare, who obtain blowguns from the Hoti; the Huottuja, or Piaroa, who get their blowguns from the Yekuana or Maquiritares; the Maquiritare, who get their curare from the Piaroa; and the Pemones, who also get their blowguns from the Yekuana or Maquiritares, though they make their own curare.

In the upper Rio Negro basin, the combination of blowguns and poisoned darts is used by the Curripacos, or Banivas, who make their own blowguns using technology and materials different, in part, from those of the ethnic groups of the Orinoco. They also produce their own curare. Their ancestors, the Waodani, used a match known as kakapa along with the curare to impregnate the darts of their blowpipes.

The Piaroa are known for making curare to impregnate the darts of their blowguns. They produce it beginning with extracts of different species of plants from the Strychnos genus– mainly maracure (Strychnos crevauxii)– mixed with kraraguero sap to increase the adhesion of the poison. An animal hit by a dart poisoned using the Piaroa recipe usually dies within fifteen minutes, depending on its body mass.

In the Philippines, Borneo, and Sulawesi, the sumpit (or sumpitan) blowgun darts are typically coated in the sap of Antiaris toxicaria (upas)— a toxin also used by the Orang Asli of Peninsular Malaysia— which causes convulsions and death by cardiac arrest. Uniquely among blowguns, sumpit are also commonly tipped with metal spearheads for use in close combat or when the ammunition is exhausted, functionally similar to bayonets.

== See also ==
- Fukiya, Japanese blowgun
- Loire-style blowgun (French page)
- Sumpitan (weapon)
