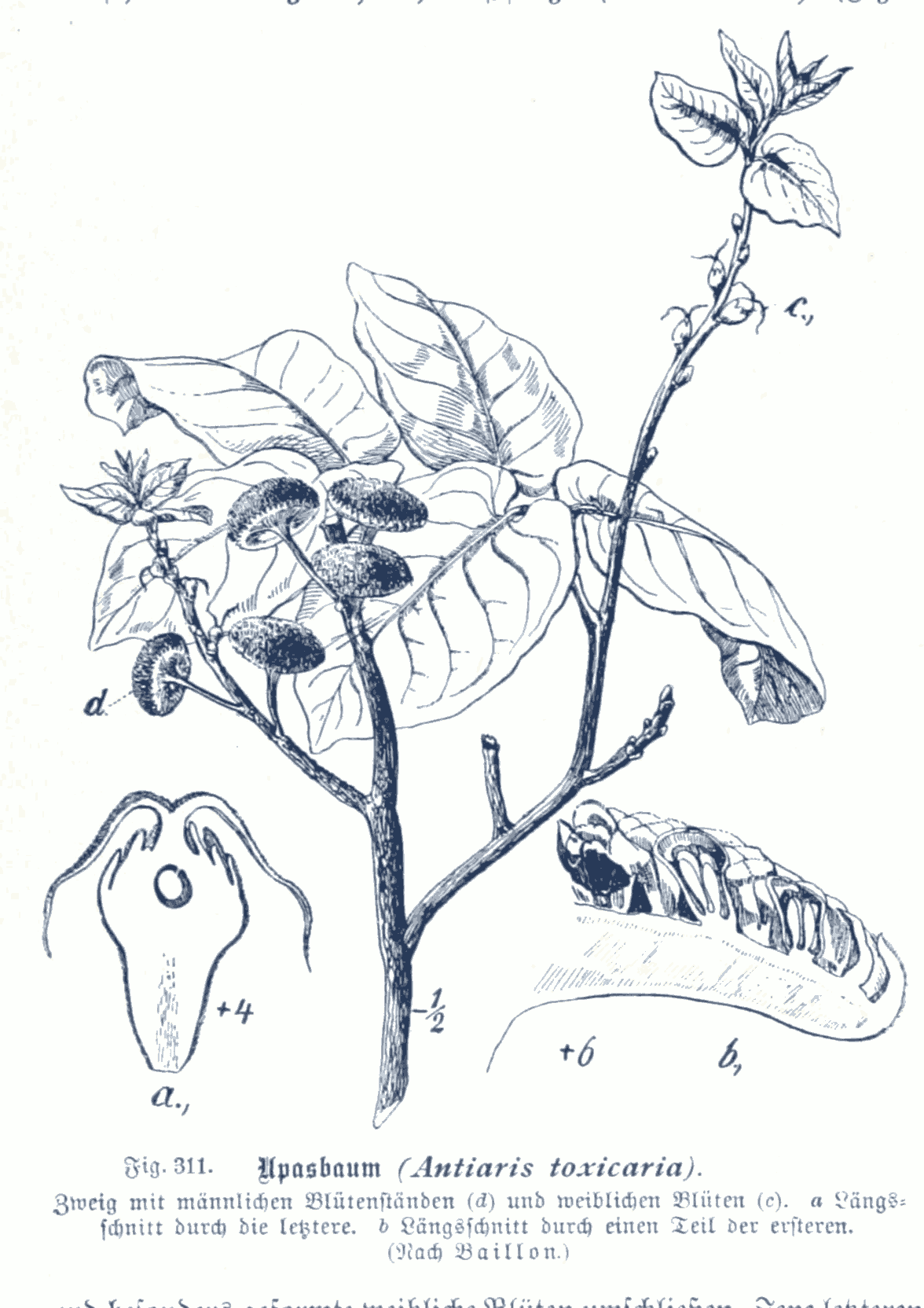
- Antiaris toxicaria

Conservation status
- Least Concern (IUCN 3.1)

Scientific classification
- Kingdom: Plantae
- Clade: Tracheophytes
- Clade: Angiosperms
- Clade: Eudicots
- Clade: Rosids
- Order: Rosales
- Family: Moraceae
- Tribe: Castilleae
- Genus: Antiaris; Lesch. (1810)
- Species: A. toxicaria

Binomial name
- Antiaris toxicaria (J.F.Gmel.) Lesch. (1810)

Synonyms
- Antschar Horsf. (1814); Ipo Pers. (1807); Lepurandra Nimmo (1839); Toxicaria Aepnel. ex Steud. (1821), pro syn.; Mithridatea toxicaria (J.F.Gmel.) F.Dietr. (1819); Ipo toxicaria (J.F.Gmel.) Pers. (1807); Cestrum toxicarium J.F.Gmel. (1792)

= Antiaris =

Genus of plants

Antiaris is a genus in the mulberry and fig family Moraceae. It is a monotypic genus, containing only one species, Antiaris toxicaria. The genus was at one time considered to consist of several species, but is now regarded as just one variable species which can be further divided into five subspecies. One significant difference within the species is that the size of the fruit decreases as one travels from Africa to Polynesia. Antiaris has a remarkably wide distribution in tropical regions, occurring in Australia, tropical Asia, tropical Africa, Indonesia, the Philippines, Tonga, and various other tropical islands. Its seeds are spread by various birds and bats, and it is not clear how many of the populations are essentially invasive. The species is of interest as a source of wood, bark cloth, and pharmacological or toxic substances.

== Naming and etymology ==
The generic epithet Antiaris is derived directly from the Javanese name for it: ancar (obsolete Dutch-era spelling: antjar). Some of the better known synonyms include Antiaris africana, Antiaris macrophylla, and Antiaris welwitschii.

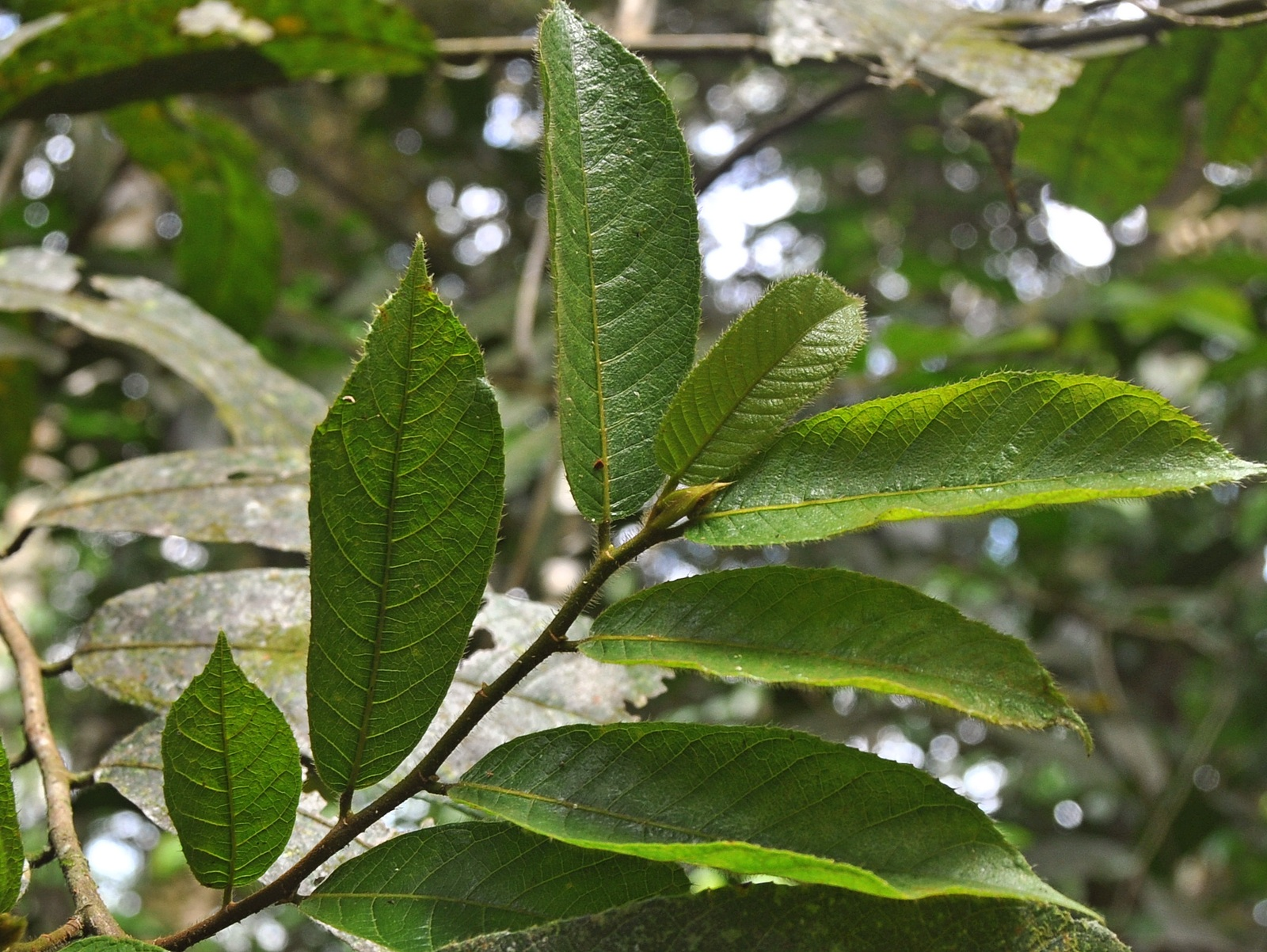
Antiaris toxicaria leaves on twig

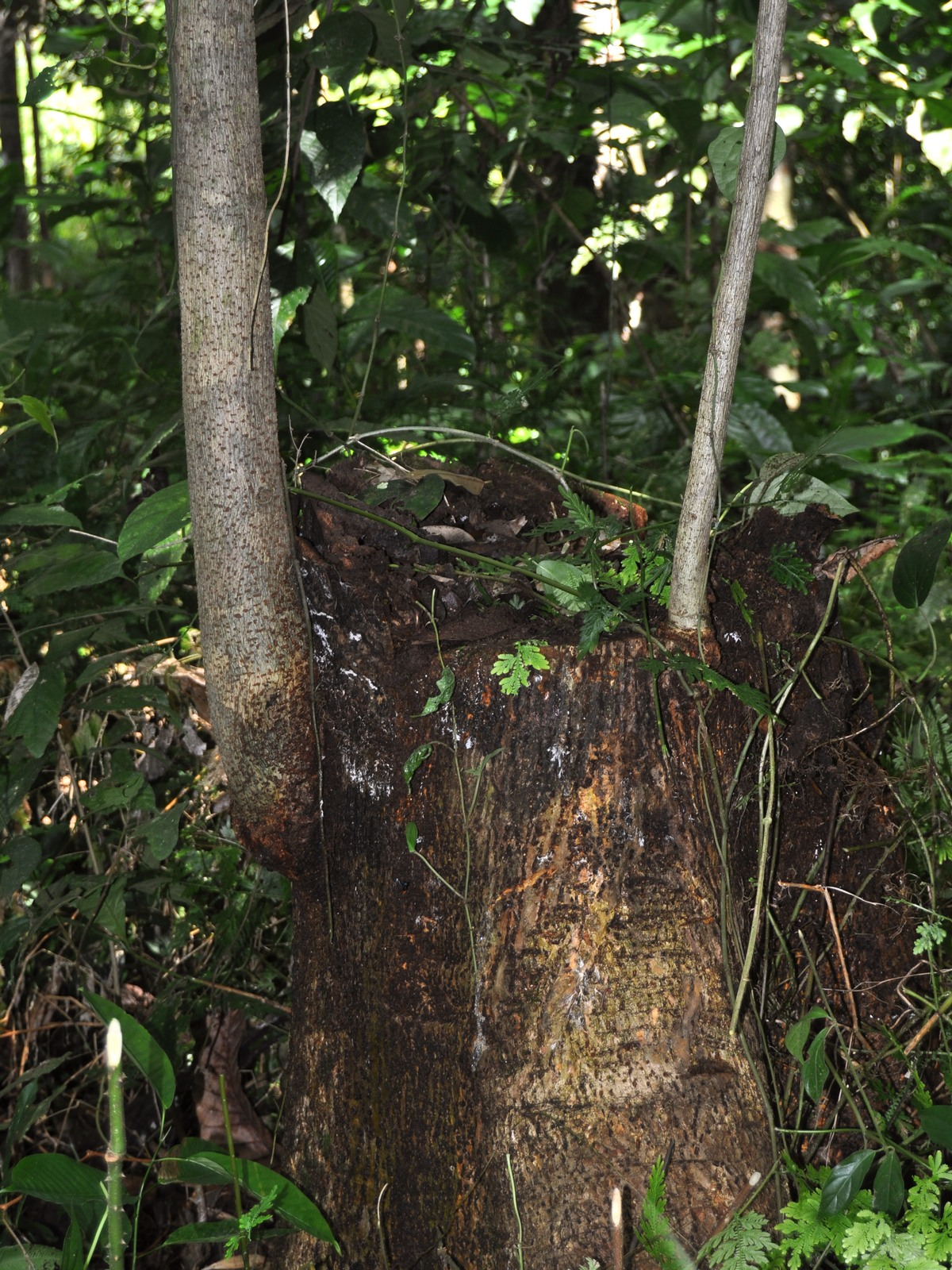
Coppice, showing young bark

In English it may be called bark cloth tree, antiaris, false iroko, false mvule or upas tree, and in the Javanese language it is known as the upas (meaning 'poison' in Javanese) or ancar. In the Indonesian language it is known as bemu. In the related official language of the Philippines, Filipino, upas, and in Malaysia's Malaysian language as ipoh or ancar. In Cambodia, it is called choer banh or choer chhâk (ជ័រឆក់ ជ័របាញ់). In Thai it is the ยางน่อง (yangnong). In Mandinka, it is the jafo and in Wolof the kan or man. In Coastal Kenya, it is called mnguonguo by the Giriama.

On the Chinese island Hainan, the tree is referred to as the "Poison Arrow Tree" (Chinese: 箭毒木; pinyin: Jiàndú Mù — "Arrow Poison Wood"), because its latex was smeared on arrowheads in ancient times by the Li people for use in hunting and warfare.

== Taxonomy ==
Currently one species of Antiaris is formally accepted, Antiaris toxicaria, with about twenty synonyms recorded and rejected as invalid. The status of other cited species like Antiaris turbinifera still is unresolved. However, given the wide range of the genus, it is quite likely that investigations under way will lead to the establishment of new species. Some varieties and subspecies are already established, pending further investigation. At present the accepted taxonomy is as follows:

- Antiaris toxicaria Lesch.
  - Antiaris toxicaria var. africana Scott Elliot ex A.Chev. (synonyms Antiaris africana Engl., A. challa (Schweinf.) Engl., A. kerstingii Engl., A. toxicaria subsp. africana (Engl.) C.C.Berg, and Ficus challa Schweinf.)
  - Antiaris toxicaria subsp. humbertii (Leandri) C.C.Berg (synonym Antiaris humbertii Leandri)
  - Antiaris toxicaria subsp. macrophylla (R.Br.) C.C.Berg (synonyms Antiaris macrophylla R.Br., A. toxicaria var. macrophylla (R.Br.) Corner, Antiaris bennettii Seem., Ipo bennettii Kuntze, I. innoxia Kuntze, and I. macrophylla Kuntze)
  - Antiaris toxicaria subsp. madagascariensis (H.Perrier) C.C.Berg (synonym Antiaris madagascariensis H.Perrier)
  - Antiaris toxicaria subsp. toxicaria (synonyms Antiaris dubia Span. ex Hook., A. innoxia Blume, A. palembanica Miq., A. rufa Miq., A. saccidora Dalzell, A. zeylanica Seem., Ipo palembanicum (Miq.) Kuntze, I. rufa Kuntze, I. saccidora (Dalzell) A.Lyons, Lepurandra saccidora Nimmo, and Toxicaria macassariensis Aepnel. ex Steud.)
  - Antiaris toxicaria var. usambarensis (Engl.) C.C.Berg (synonym Antiaris usambarensis Engl.)
  - Antiaris toxicaria subsp. welwitschii (Engl.) C.C.Berg (synonyms Antiaris toxicaria var. welwitschii (Engl.) Corner and A. welwitschii Engl.)
- Antiaris turbinifera Hemsl. (unresolved)

== Characteristics ==
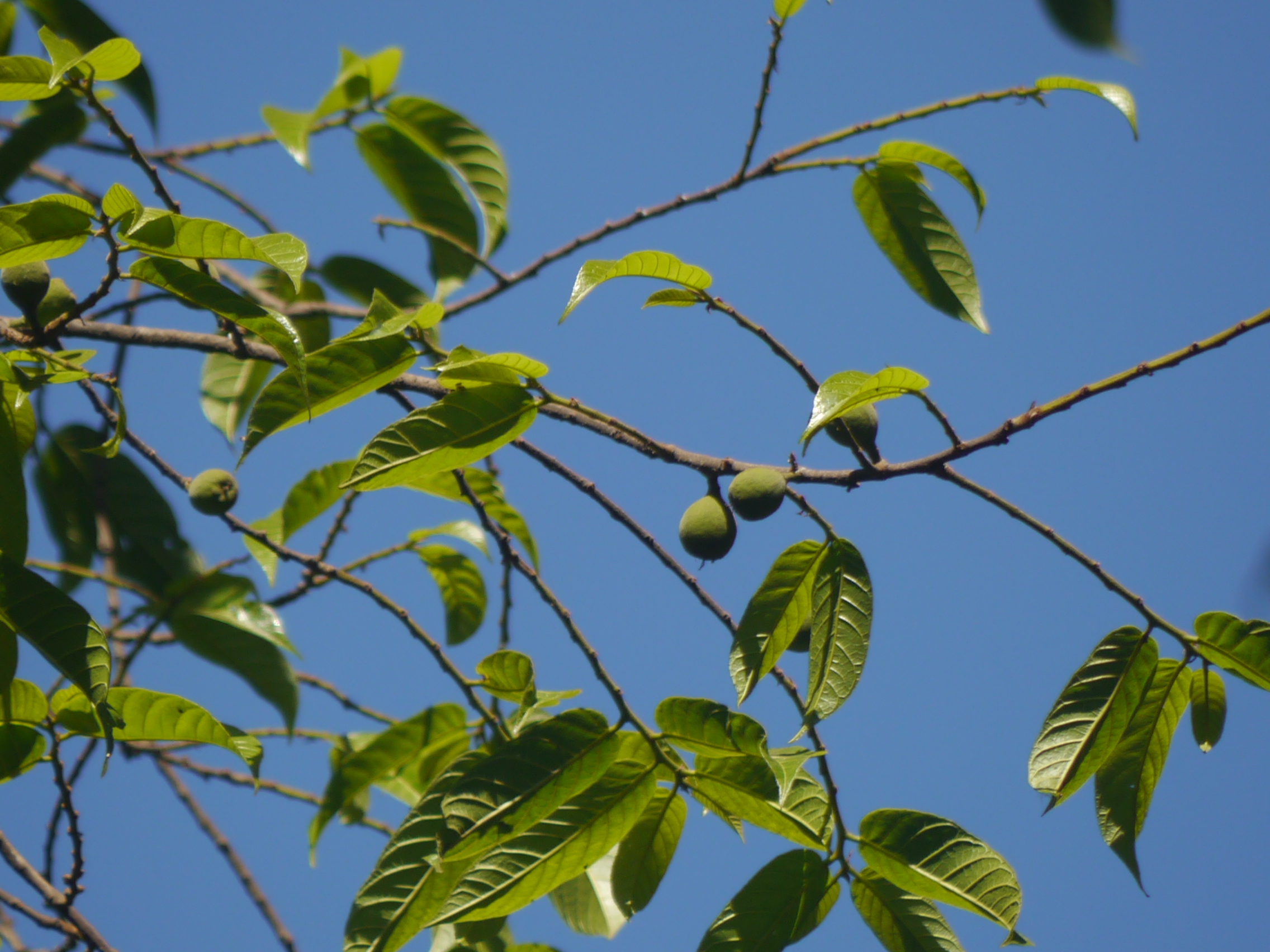
Fruiting twigs

Antiaris toxicaria is monoecious. It is a large tree, growing to 25–40 m tall, with a trunk up to 40 cm diameter, often buttressed at the base, with pale grey bark. The trees have milky to watery latex. The leaves are elliptic to obovate, 7–19 cm long and 3–6 cm broad. The African tree bears larger fruit than Asian and Polynesian populations. The Indonesian Antiaris toxicaria flowers in June. In Kenya peak seeding time is March. The edible fruit is a red or purple drupe 2 cm in diameter, with a single seed. The tree grows rapidly and attains maturity within 20 years. It is classified by Hawthorne W.D. as a non-pioneer light demanding tree.

== Distribution ==
The Antiaris tree is found in grassy savanna and coastal plateaus. In Africa, there are three varieties clearly distinguished by habitat and their juvenile forms. One is confined mainly to wooded grassland, the other two are found in wet forests; rainforest, riverine forest and semi-swamp forests. It generally does not grow above 1500 metres elevation.

== Uses ==
Antiaris toxicaria is a fairly small-scale source of timber and yields a lightweight hardwood with density of 250–540 kilogram per cubic metre (similar to balsa). As the wood peels very easily and evenly, it is commonly used for veneer.

The bark has a high concentration of tannins that are used in traditional clothes dyeing and paints.

The seed from the fruit, which is a soft and edible red or purple drupe 2 cm in diameter, is dispersed by birds, bats, possums, monkeys, deer, antelopes and humans.

In Africa and Polynesia the bast fibre is harvested and is used in preparing strong, coarse bark cloth for clothing. The clothes often are decorated with the dye produced from the bark tannins.

Antiaris toxicaria is an excellent, fast-growing shade tree and often is grown around human dwellings for shade. The leaf litter is an excellent compost material and high in nutrients. It often is applied as mulch or green manure in local gardens, which must be grown beyond the shade of the extremely dense canopy of the tree.

Recently, the plant had allegedly been used by retired Tanzanian pastor Ambilikile Mwasapile to allegedly cure all manner of diseases, including HIV/AIDS, diabetes, high blood pressure, cancer, asthma, and others. While found to be harmless to humans when boiled in accordance with Mwasapile's mode of creating a medicinal drink out of the bark, it allegedly was undergoing testing by the WHO and Tanzanian health authorities to verify whether it has any medicinal value. However, conflicting reports suggest that the plant in question is not in fact Antiaris, but rather Carissa edulis.

== Poison ==
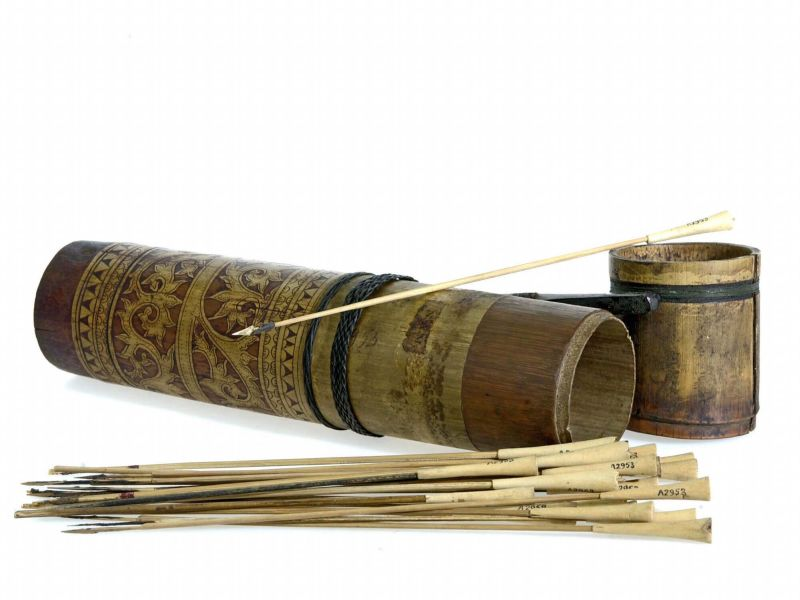
Sumpitan quiver and poison cup from the Dayak people of Sabah, Malaysia

The latex of Antiaris toxicaria contains intensely toxic cardenolides, in particular a cardiac glycoside named antiarin. It is used as a toxin for arrows, darts, and blowdarts in Island Southeast Asian cultures. In various ethnic groups of the Philippines, Borneo, Sulawesi and Malaysia the concentrated sap of Antiaris toxicaria is known as upas, apo, or ipoh, among other names. The concentrate is applied (by dipping) to darts used in sumpit blowguns employed for hunting and warfare. In Javanese tradition in Indonesia, Antiaris toxicaria (also known as upas) is mixed with Strychnos ignatii for arrow poison.

In China, this plant is known as "arrow poison wood" and the poison is said to be so deadly that it has been described as "Seven Up Eight Down Nine Death" meaning that a victim can take no more than seven steps uphill, eight steps downhill or nine steps on level ground before dying. Some travellers' tales have it that the upas tree is the most poisonous in the world, so that no one can reach the trunk before falling down dead.

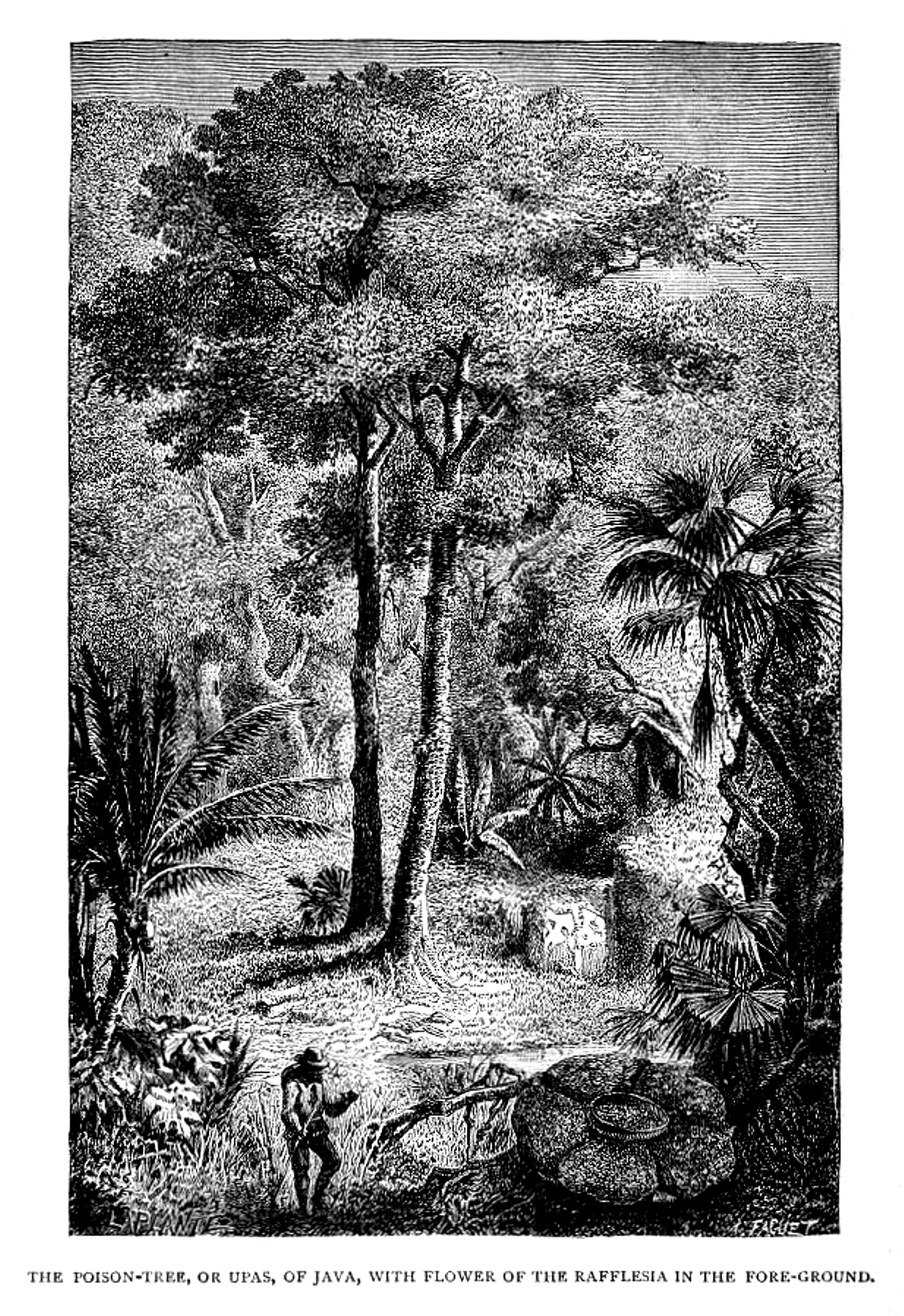
Upas Tree from an 1887 illustration

Another account (professedly by one Foersch, who was a surgeon at Semarang in 1773) was published in The London Magazine, December 1783, and popularized by Erasmus Darwin in Loves of the Plants (Botanic Garden, pt. ii). The tree was said to destroy all animal life within a radius of 15 miles or more. The poison was fetched by condemned malefactors, of whom scarcely two out of twenty returned. Geoffrey Grigson proposed that this exaggerated description was perpetrated by George Steevens. In fact, the deaths were due to an adjoining extinct volcano near Batar, called Guava Upas. Due to confusion of names, the poisonous effects of the deadly valley have been ascribed to the Upas tree.

Literary allusions to the tree's poisonous nature are frequent and as a rule are not to be taken seriously. A poem that has been frequently commented on and set to music is "The Upas-Tree" by Pushkin. Deriding the cliched, overwrought diction in Silly Novels By Lady Novelists, George Eliot observed, "In their novels there is usually a lady or gentleman who is more or less of a upas tree".

One of the heroes of Thomas Mann's novel The Magic Mountain written in 1924 mentioned this tree in the following context: "The knowledge of drugs possessed by the coloured races was far superior to our own. In certain islands east of Dutch New Guinea, youths and maidens prepared a love charm from the bark of a tree—it was probably poisonous, like the hippomane manzanilla, or the Antiaris toxicaria the deadly upas tree of Java, which could poison the air round with its steam and fatally stupefy man and beast".

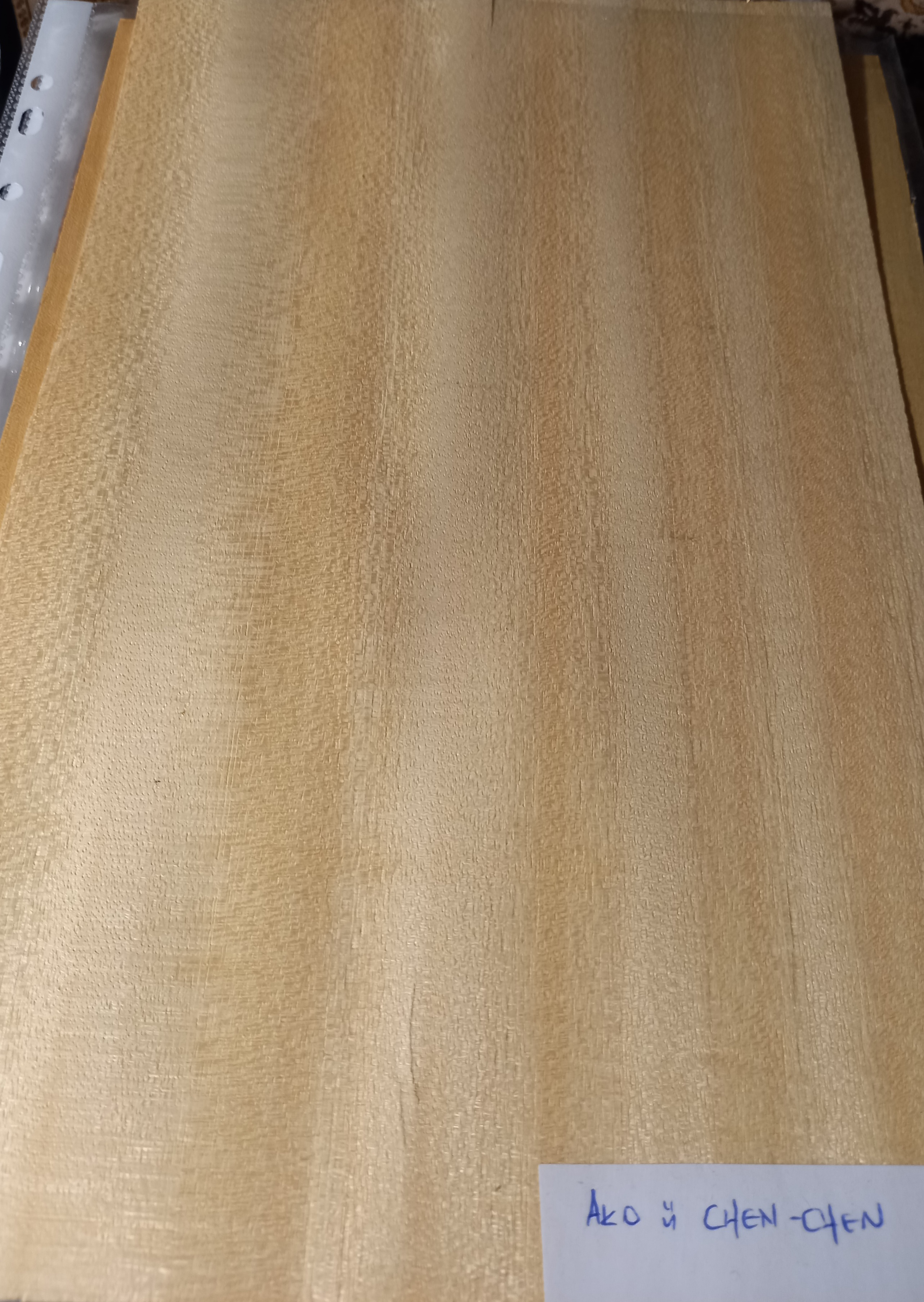
Antiaris, or Chen chen or Ako veneer (Antiaris africana, A. toxicaria, A. welwitschii)

== Wood ==
Antiaris species give a nice colour wood. Known by the trade names Ako or Chen Chen is a light-coloured tropical hardwood valued for its decorative veneer applications. The wood ranges from creamy white to pale yellow with a fine, even texture and a generally straight grain, producing a clean and uniform appearance.

Decorative veneers of Antiaris are used for interior wall panels, furniture, cabinetry, doors, and architectural joinery. Designers use it to achieve both natural and contemporary aesthetics.

== Literature ==
- Berg, C.C., 1977. Revisions of African Moraceae (excluding Dorstenia, Ficus, Musanga and Myrianthus). Bulletin du Jardin Botanique National de Belgique, 47: 267–407.
- Bisset, N.G., 1962. Cardiac glycosides: Part VI. Moraceae: The genus Antiaris Lesch. Planta Medica, 10: 143–151.
- Boer, E. & Sosef, M.S.M., 1998. Antiaris Lesch. In: Sosef, M.S.M., Hong, L.T. & Prawirohatmodjo, S. (Editors): Plant Resources of South-East Asia,5(3). Timber trees: Lesser-known timbers. Backhuys Publishers, Leiden, the Netherlands. pp. 73–75.
- Browne, F.G., 1955. Forest trees of Sarawak and Brunei and their products. Government Printing Office, Kuching, Malaysia. pp. 348–349.
- Burkill, I.H., 1966. A dictionary of the economic products of the Malay Peninsula. Revised reprint volume 1 (A-H). Ministry of Agriculture and Cooperatives, Kuala Lumpur, Malaysia. pp. 175–185.
- Council of Scientific and Industrial Research, 1948. The wealth of India: a dictionary of Indian raw materials & industrial products. Volume 1. Publications and Information Directorate, New Delhi, India. pp. 83–84.
- Dolder, F., Tamm, C. & Reichstein, T., 1955. Die Glykoside von Antiaris toxicaria Lesch. Glykoside und Aglycone, 150 [Glycosides of Antiaris toxicaria Lesch. Glycoside and aglycones, 150]. Helvetica Chimica Acta, 38(6): 1364–1396.
- Hano, Y., Mitsui, P. & Nomura, T., 1990. Seven prenylphenols, antiarones C, D, E, F, G, H and I from the root bark of Antiaris toxicaria Lesch. Heterocycles 31(7): 1315–1324.
- Pételot, A., 1954. Les plantes médicinales du Cambodge, du Laos et du Vietnam. [The medicinal plants of Cambodia, Laos and Vietnam]. Vol. 3. Centre National de Recherches Scientifiques et Techniques, Saigon, Vietnam. pp. 126–127.
- Quisumbing, E., 1978. Medicinal plants of the Philippines. Katha Publishing Co., Quezon City, the Philippines. pp. 224–226.
