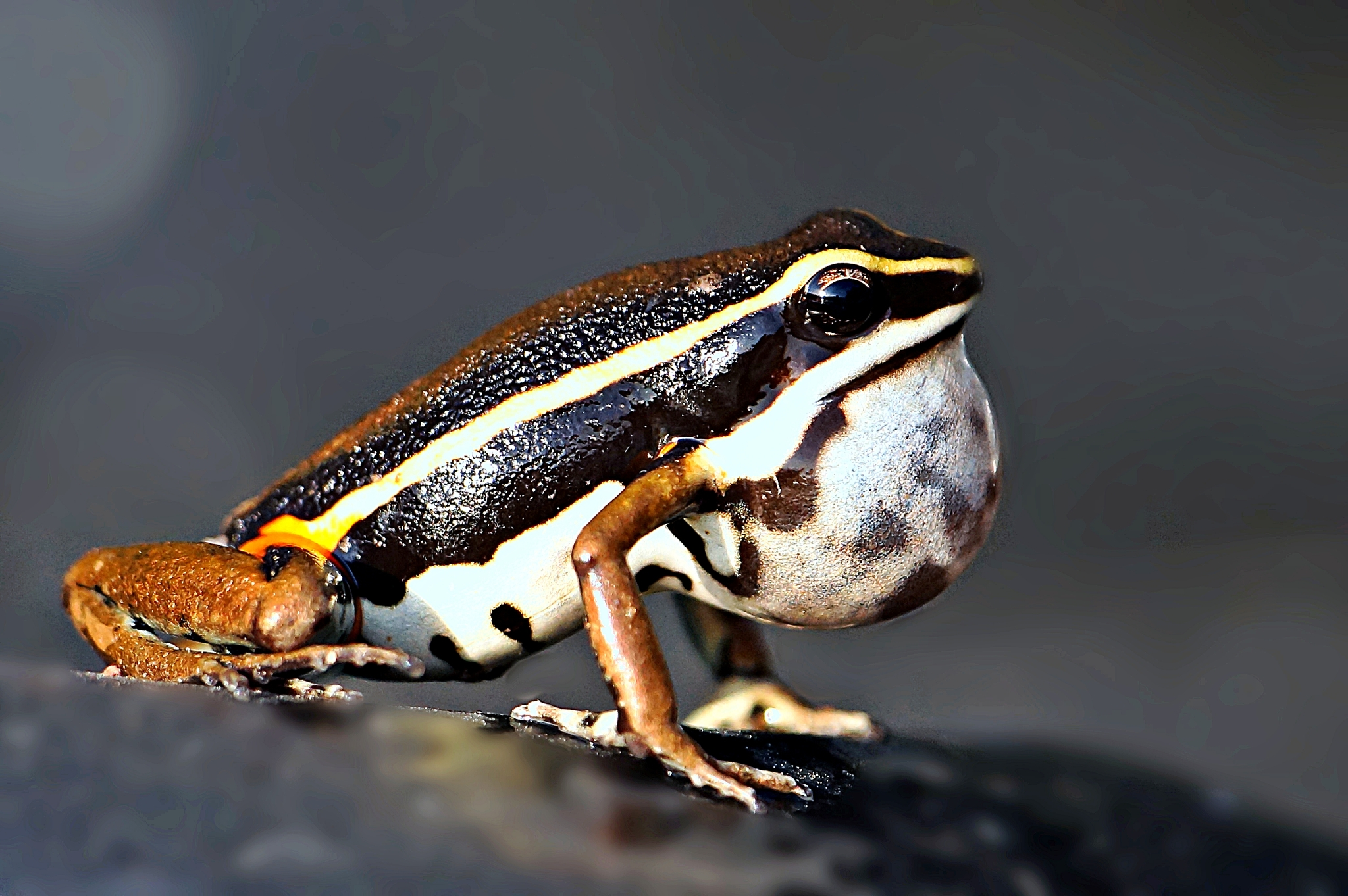

Conservation status
- Least Concern (IUCN 3.1)

Scientific classification
- Kingdom: Animalia
- Phylum: Chordata
- Class: Amphibia
- Order: Anura
- Family: Dendrobatidae
- Genus: Ameerega
- Species: A. munduruku

Binomial name
- Ameerega munduruku Neves, Silva, Akieda, Cabrera, Koroiva & Santana, 2017

= Ameerega munduruku =

Species of frog

Ameerega munduruku is a species of poison dart frog in the family Dendrobatidae. It was described in 2017 by the herpetologist Matheus Neves and his colleagues, and is named after the Munduruku, an ethnic group native to Brazil. A medium-sized frog for its genus, it has a snout–vent length of 24.9–27.3 mm (0.98–1.07 in) for adult males and 20.4–28.6 mm (0.80–1.13 in) for adult females. It has black uppersides, with a cream stripe from the snout to the groin, white undersides with worm-like black markings, and brown uppersides to the limbs. There are orange spots on the armpit and lower leg and an orange stripe from the groin to the thigh. Both sexes are similar but can be told apart by the presence of vocal slits in males.

The species is endemic to Brazil, where it is known from two localities in the states of Pará and Mato Grosso. It inhabits Mato Grosso tropical dry forests and Madeira–Tapajós moist forests at elevations of around 200 m (660 ft), where it shelters in rocky outcrops near water in open areas of forest. It breeds during the wet season, with tadpoles having been recorded in November.

== Taxonomy and systematics ==
Ameerega munduruku was described by the herpetologist Matheus Neves and his colleagues in 2017 on the basis of an adult male specimen collected from Pará, Brazil, in 2016. It is named after the Munduruku, an ethnic group living in the Brazilian states of Pará and Mato Grosso.

The frog is one of 29 species currently recognised within Ameerega, a genus of poison dart frogs native to South America. Before the description of the species, populations of A. munduruku were considered to represent A. picta, although subsequent studies have found that these two species are not closely related. Within its genus, A. munduruku is most closely related (sister) to A. braccata. The clade (group of organisms descending from a common ancestor) formed by these two species is sister to one formed by A. flavopicta and A. berohoka. These four species are sister to another clade formed by A. boehmei and a currently undescribed species from Mato Grosso, and these six species together are sister to A. boliviana. The following cladogram shows relationships within this clade based on a phylogeny by a 2020 study:

- Ameerega
  - A. boliviana
  - - - - Ameerega sp. "MatoGrosso1"
        - A. boehmei
      - - - - A. munduruku
            - A. braccata
        - - A. flavopicta
          - A. berohoka

== Description ==
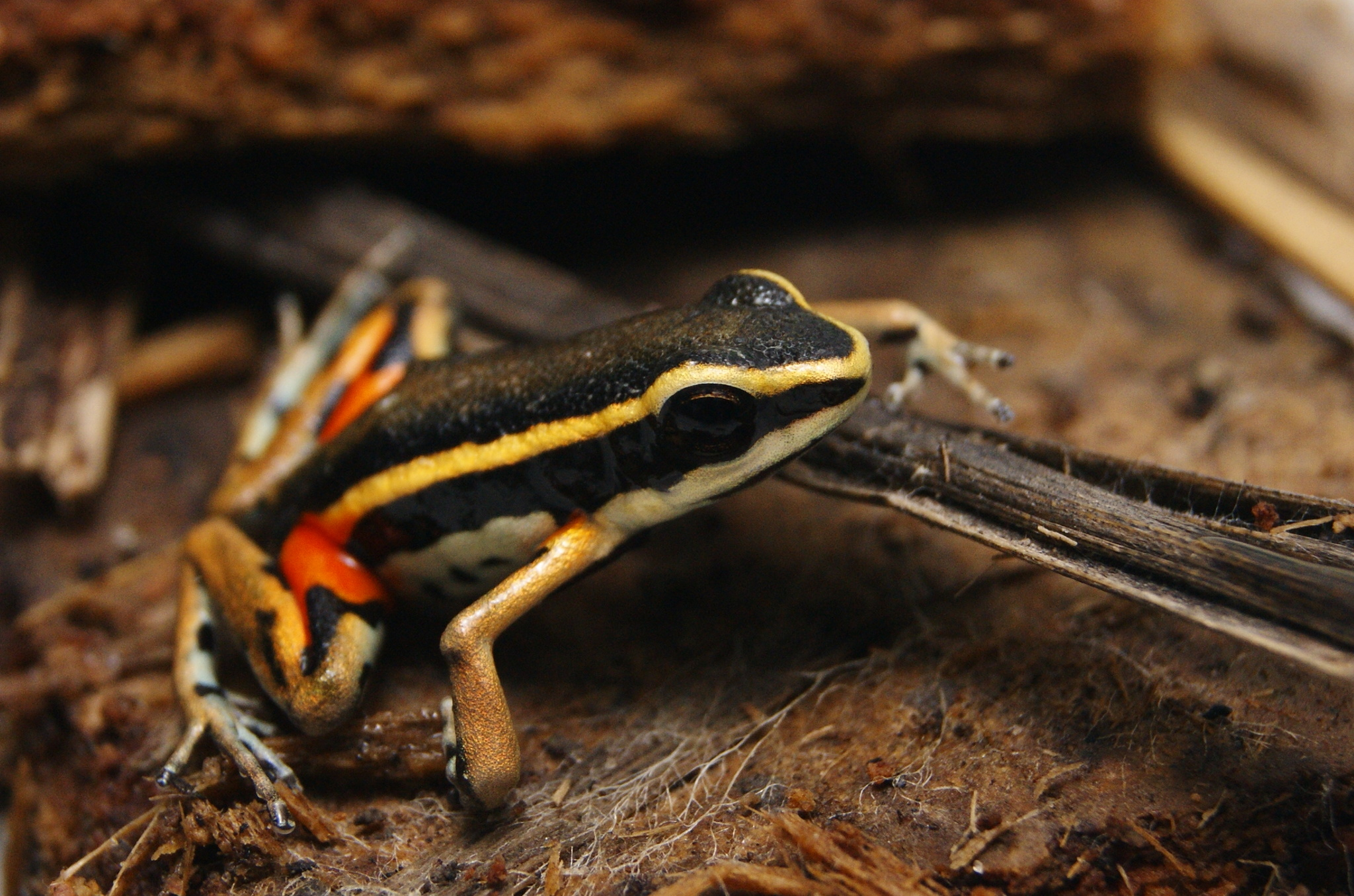
A. munduruku showing orange stripe on thigh

A. munduruku is a medium-sized frog for its genus, with a snout–vent length of 24.87–27.33 mm (0.979–1.076 in) for adult males and 20.42–28.59 mm (0.804–1.126 in) for adult females. The back is mostly black, with a cream stripe along the edge of the upperside and over the eye, from the snout to the groin. Another cream stripe runs from the tip of the upper jaw to the forelimbs. The undersides of the body and limbs are white, with worm-like black markings, and the chin is white with black spots. The uppersides of the limbs are brown with some black markings on the hands. Two orange spots are present: one on the armpit and another hidden one on the lower leg. An orange stripe runs from the groin to the upperside of the thigh. The iris is metallic golden. Both sexes look broadly similar, but can be distinguished by the presence of vocal slits (slits on the side of the tongue joining the mouth to the vocal sac) in males. When preserved in 70% ethanol, the orange markings and the cream stripes are duller in colour and the iris is grey. The skin of the upperside is mostly granulated, except on the head and forelimbs; the skin of the underside is smooth. The hands and feet lack webbing, and there are no protrusions on the tarsus.

The species can be identified as a member of its genus by its aposematic colouration, a bright spot near the calf, a light stripe along the upperside, no pale line along the sides, the absence of webbing, and the presence of neopalatines. It can be told apart from other species in its genus by a combination of its medium size; a snout that is short when seen from above and projecting when seen from the side; a black upperside; a white underside with black markings; the presence of the orange spots and stripe; only the lower portion of the ring of the tympanum (external ear) being visible and the fold above the tympanum being absent; and small hands with well-developed discs on the fingers.

=== Vocalizations ===
The advertisement call consists of single notes 0.113–0.116 s long, separated by intervals of 0.096–0.639 s. The single-note nature of the call, as opposed to pulsed vocalizations, distinguishes this species from A. berohoka, A. braccata, A. flavopicta, and A. boehmei, and the length of the notes differentiates it from A. braccata, A. hahneli, and A. picta, all of which have shorter calls. The calls are mainly delivered at a frequency of 3,445.3–3,617.6 Hz, helping tell the frog apart from A. altamazonica, A. berohoka, A. boehmei, A. braccata, and A. picta.

== Distribution and ecology ==
The species is endemic to Brazil, where it is known from Jacareacanga Municipality in Pará and Paranaíta Municipality in Mato Grosso. A. munduruku has been recorded from Mato Grosso tropical dry forests and Madeira–Tapajós moist forests within the Amazon, sheltering in rocky outcrops near water in open areas in forest at elevations of around 200 m (660 ft). They have also been observed inside forests, living on fallen trunks and rocks and in leaf litter. Frogs known to co-occur with A. munduruku include Ceratophrys cornuta, Lithodytes lineatus, Allobates tapajos, Proceratophrys korekore, and species in the genus Adenomera. A male carrying nine tadpoles on its back has been observed in November, during the wet season.

== Threats ==
The IUCN classifies this frog as least concern of extinction, but it does face some threat. This is principally habitat loss associated with deforestation in favor of agriculture and livestock cultivation. The construction of hydroelectric dams may also pose some threat to this species.
