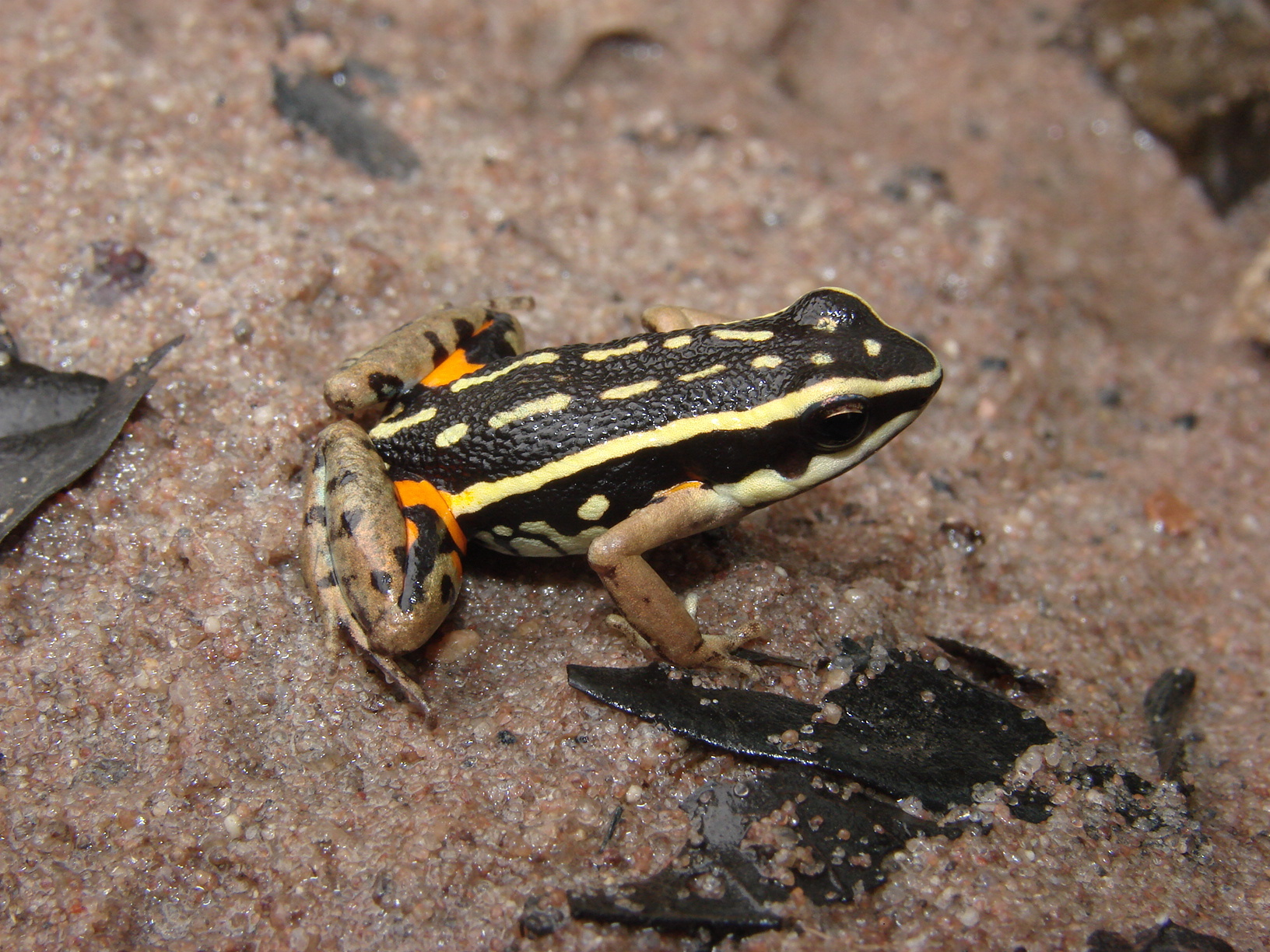

Conservation status
- Least Concern (IUCN 3.1)

Scientific classification
- Kingdom: Animalia
- Phylum: Chordata
- Class: Amphibia
- Order: Anura
- Family: Dendrobatidae
- Genus: Ameerega
- Species: A. braccata

Binomial name
- Ameerega braccata (Steindachner, 1864)

Synonyms
- Dendrobates braccatus Steindachner, 1864; Epipedobates braccatus (Steindachner, 1864)

= Ameerega braccata =

Species of frog

Ameerega braccata, formerly Epipedobates braccatus, is a species of frog in the family Dendrobatidae. It is endemic to the Central-West Region of Brazil and is known from southern Mato Grosso, Mato Grosso do Sul, and southwestern Goiás states; however, it is likely that its true range extends into adjacent Bolivia and Paraguay.

== Description ==
Ameerega braccata are relatively small frogs measuring 14–17 mm (0.6–0.7 in) in snout–vent length. Skin is slightly granular. The fingers bear small discs. The dorsum is dark brown with pale brown marbling and, in most individuals, yellowish spots. The flanks are black. There are two yellowish white to yellow dorsolateral stripes extending from the tip of the snout to the groin. The belly is brownish white with scattered small black spots. The chest and throat are brown.

Ameerega braccata produces several types of calls. The male advertisement call consists of a single, unpulsed note lasting about 0.1 seconds, with a frequency range from 3.5 to 4.2 kHz. The territorial call is composed of 5–6 repeated notes that are structurally similar to the advertisement call notes. The courtship call is emitted in close-range male–female interactions. These calls consist of short notes (duration 0.04 seconds) and may reach frequencies of 2.2–5.3 kHz.

== Diet ==
Ameerega braccata has a specialized diet in ants, termites, and mites. Additionally, the abundance of consumed prey differed among the males and females of this species.

== Habitat and conservation ==
This frog inhabits gallery forests in the Cerrado and could be found amidst leaf litter; they have also been recorded in more open areas. This frog has been observed between 180 and 260 meters above sea level. The eggs are deposited on land; the larvae are then transported (in at least one occasion, by the male) to streams where they develop further.

Ameerega braccata does not adapt well to anthropogenic disturbance and is therefore threatened by habitat loss caused by agriculture (both crops and livestock) and by fires. It is present in the Pantanal Matogrossense and Chapada dos Guimarães National Parks.
