= Umbyquyra gurleyi =

Scientific classification
- Kingdom: Animalia
- Phylum: Arthropoda
- Subphylum: Chelicerata
- Class: Arachnida
- Order: Araneae
- Infraorder: Mygalomorphae
- Family: Theraphosidae
- Genus: Umbyquyra
- Species: U. gurleyi

Binomial name
- Umbyquyra gurleyi Sherwood & Gabriel, 2020

Species of tarantula

Umbyquyra gurleyi is a tarantula in the genus Umbyquyra, it is found in Brazil in Goiás in the National Park "Emas", it was first described by Danniella Sherwood and Ray Gabriel in 2020. It was named in honor of American herpetologist Russ Gurley, for his contributions and friendship to the authors.

== Description ==
Its color has only been described in alcohol, that being brown, no visual abdomen or leg patterning. The urticating patch is faded in colouration. The lower extent of metatarsal scopulae on the second leg, compared to the first, third and fourth leg is unusual, being the same in the both sides. In this tarantula the second leg is the shortest, while in most tarantulas the third is the shortest.

== Habitat ==
This tarantula is found in "Emas" national park, where its mostly part of the cerrado savannah, this region being defined by their lack of trees and tall termite mounds, leading to odd fauna. The writers also added it was "associated with termite mounds" without any followup or context for the statement.
