= Chapada dos Guimarães National Park =

National park in Mato Grosso, Brazil

- Parque Nacional da Chapada dos Guimarães
- IUCN category II (national park)
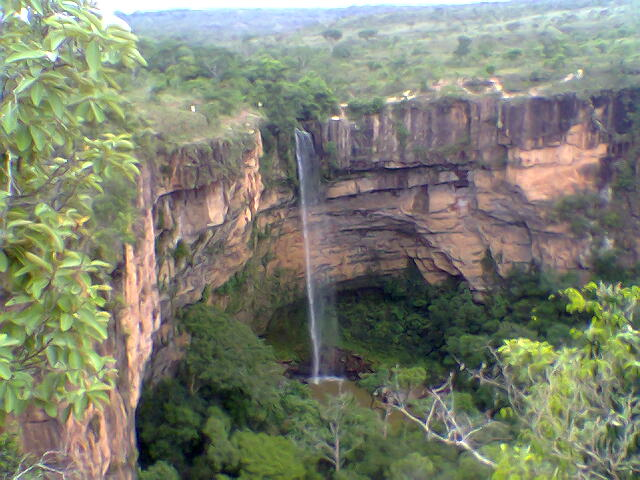
- Véu da Noiva waterfall

- Location within Brazil
- Coordinates: 15.359°S 55.898°W
- Area: 32,630 hectares (80,600 acres)
- Designation: National park
- Created: 12 April 1989
- Administrator: ICMBio

The Chapada dos Guimarães National Park (Portuguese: Parque Nacional da Chapada dos Guimarães) is a national park in the state of Mato Grosso, Brazil. It is a region of rugged terrain with dramatic cliffs and waterfalls, and contains the geographical centre of the continent.

== Background ==
The origins of the park date to 13 September 1910 when the vice president of Mato Grosso, Colonel Pedro Celestino Corrêa da Costa, concerned about the devastation of vegetation in the headwaters of the Coxipó-açu, Manso and Cuiabá rivers, declared that the area was one of public utility. In 1984 a coalition of environmentalists, artists and intellectuals in the state launched a petition to protest against the act of the government in creating a tourist complex nearby. In February 1986 a national campaign was launched by NGOs to ask president José Sarney to create the national park. This finally took place three years later.

== Location ==
The park was created on 12 April 1989 by Law 97.656, with 32,630 hectares (80,600 acres). It lies in the municipalities of Cuiabá and Chapada dos Guimarães. The purpose is to protect significant samples of the local ecosystems and to ensure the preservation of natural and archaeological sites, while supporting appropriate use for visiting, education and research.

The park is in the Pantanal Biosphere Reserve, which also includes the Pantanal, Emas and Serra da Bodoquena national parks, and the Serra de Santa Bárbara and Nascentes do Rio Taquari, Pantanal de Rio Negro state parks. The park is in the basin of the upper Paraguay River, protecting the headwaters of the Cuiabá River, one of the main feeders of the Mato Grosso Pantanal. Chapada is a Brazilian word that means a region of steep cliffs, usually at the edge of a plateau.

The geographical center of South America, formerly considered to be in the city of Cuiabá where it is marked by a white marble obelisk, is in fact located in the park near the town of Chapado dos Guimarães at the "Mirante de Geodésia", a scenic lookout point.

== Environment ==
The climate is tropical, with temperatures ranging from 12 to 25 °C (54 to 77 °F) and annual rainfall of 1,800 to 2,000 millimetres (71 to 79 in). The rain falls mostly in spring and summer, with a little rain in autumn and winter. The terrain of the park is characterized by large hills and red sandstone cliffs ranging from 600 to 800 metres (2,000 to 2,600 ft) in height. Visitor attractions include mountain peaks, waterfalls and caves.

Fauna includes Brazilian jaguar, puma, pampas deer, howler monkey, tapir, giant anteater and armadillo, maned wolf, greater rhea (also known as ema) and seriema. Many other birds, including various parrots, swifts and scarlet macaws, nest in the sandstone cliffs. The park is threatened by wildfire in the cooler, drier, windy period of the year, often caused by human activities near or in the park. Lightning does not seem to be a risk, since it is usually followed by rain.

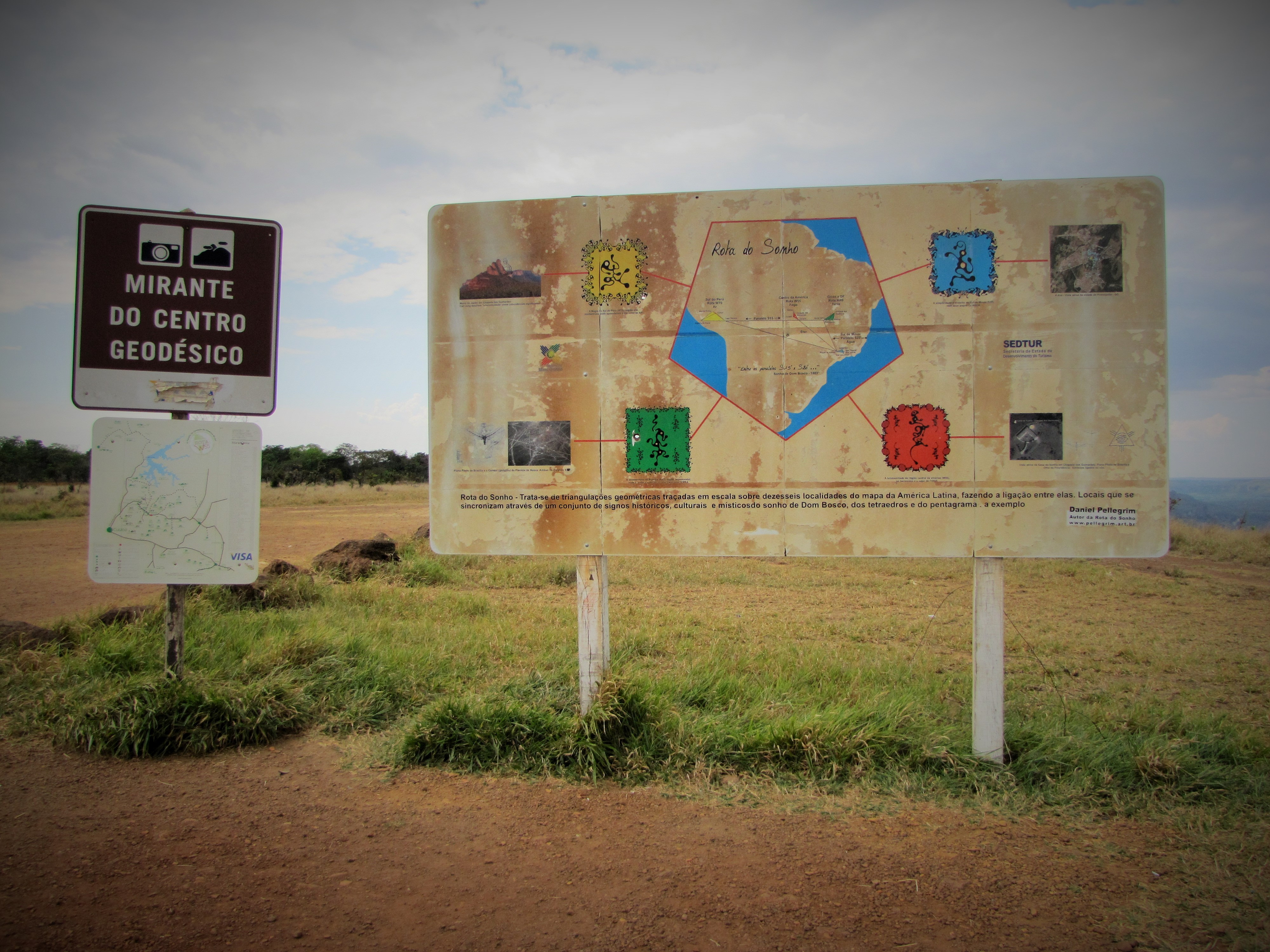
Mirante de Geodésia

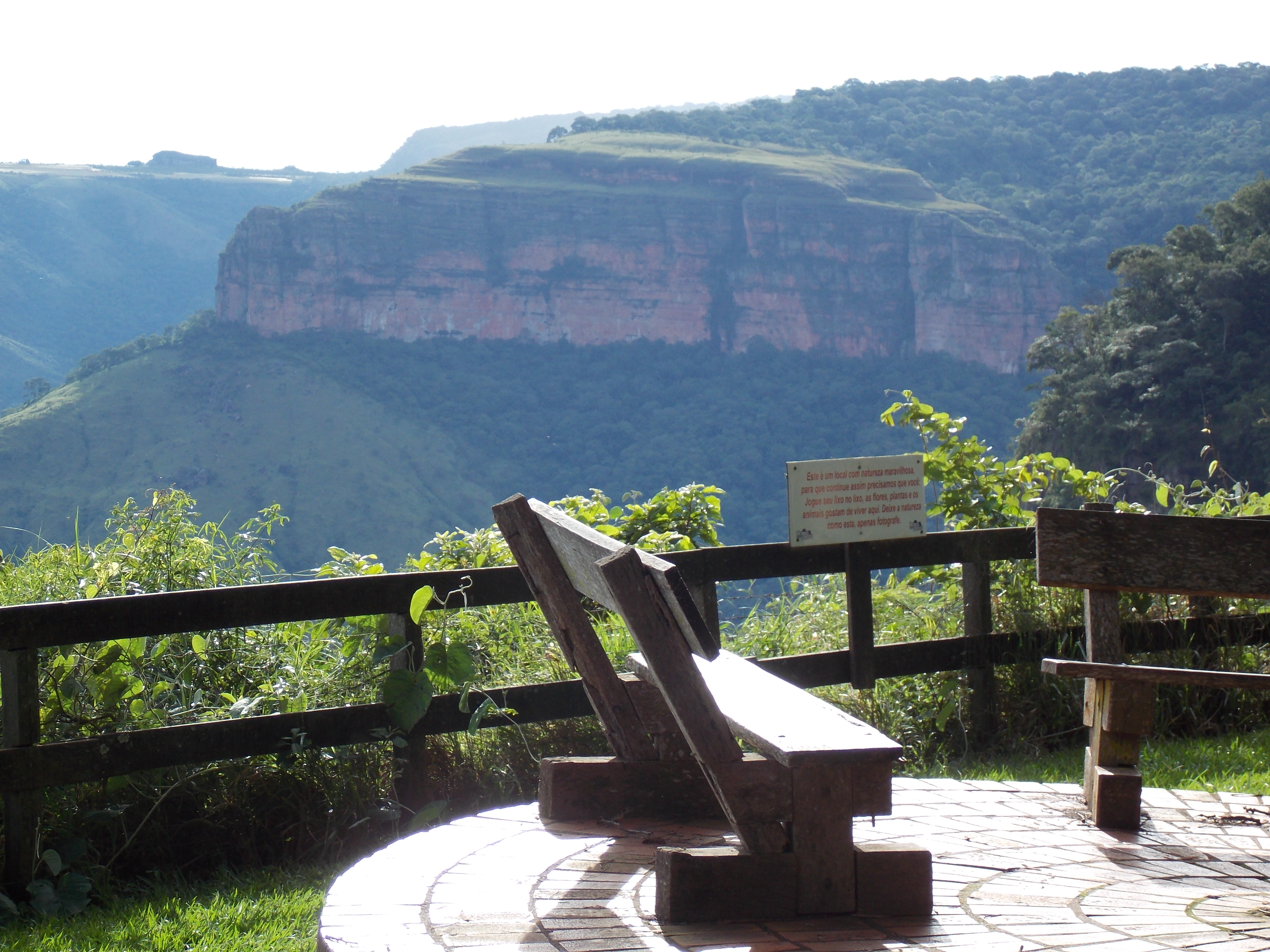

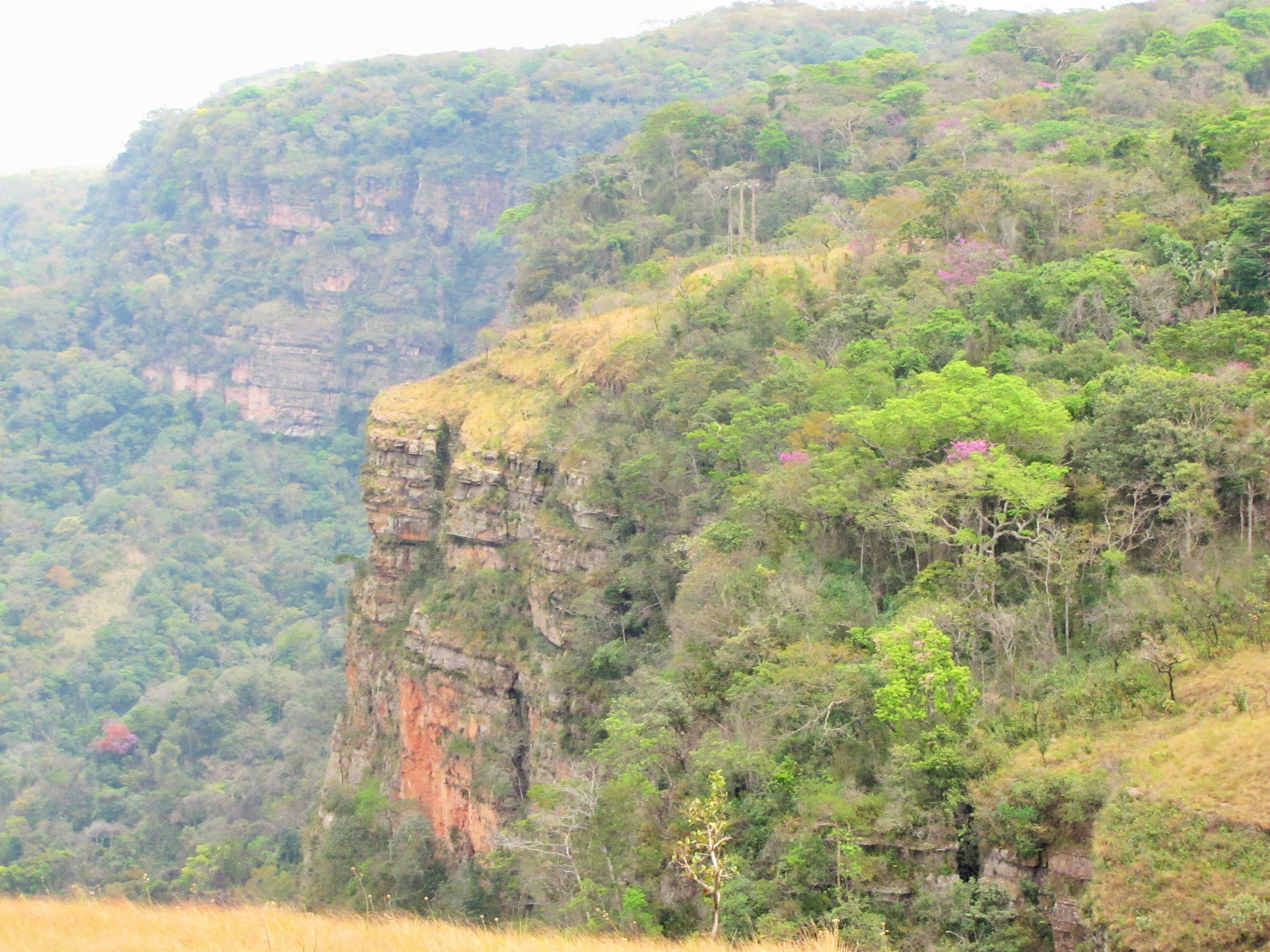

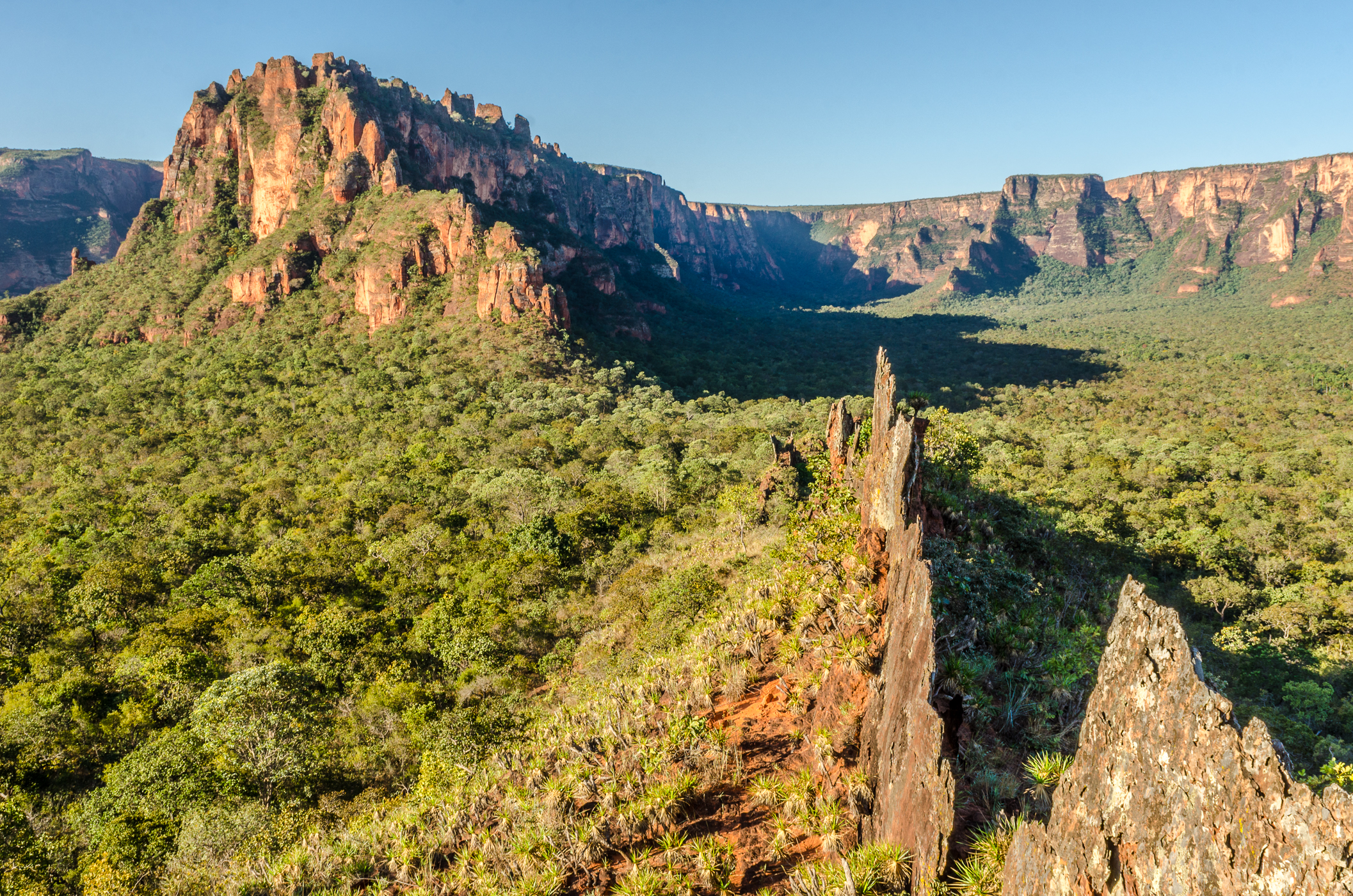

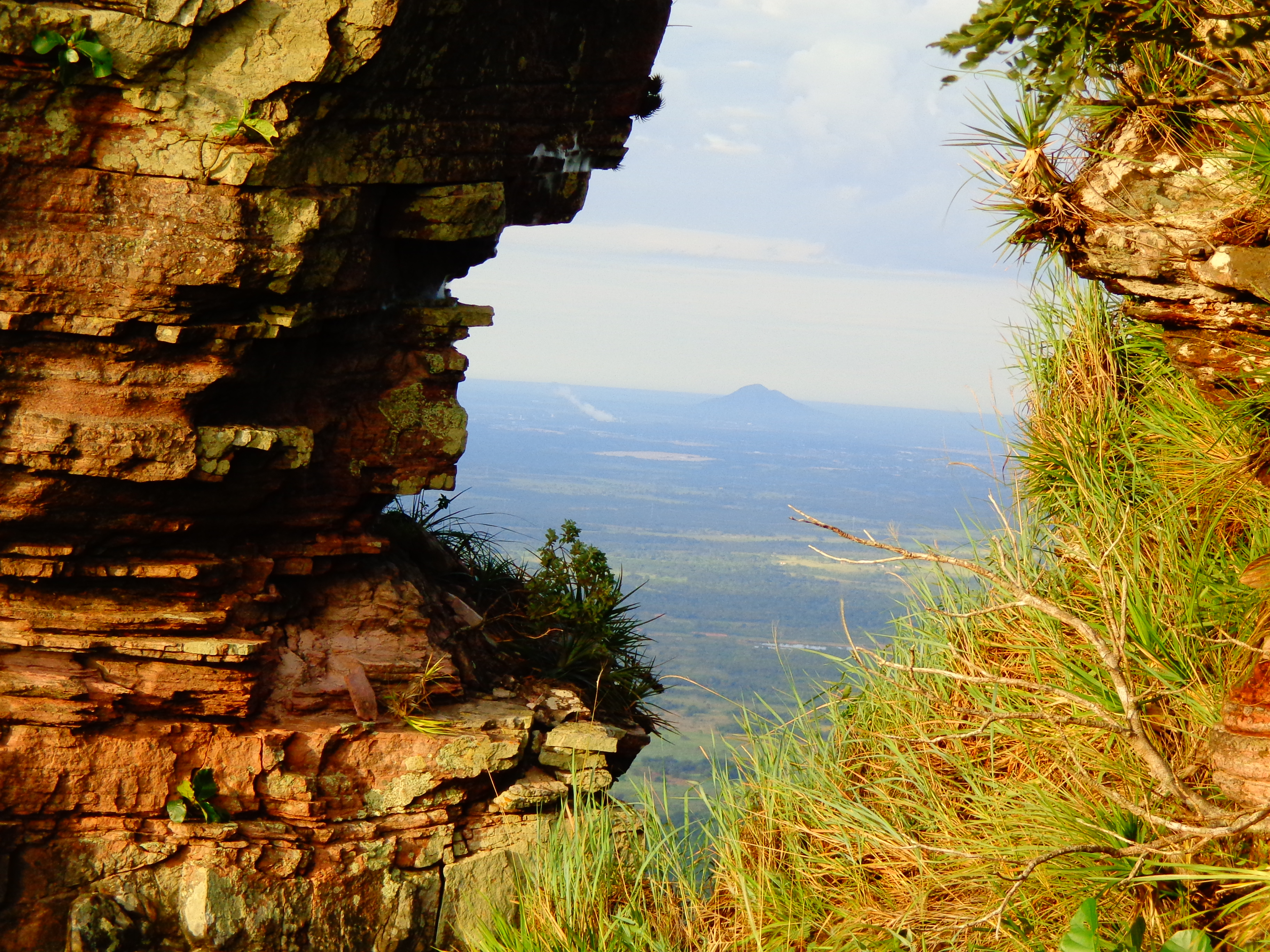

== Sources ==
- Carrijo, Martha GilkaGutiérrez; Torrecilha, Sylvia (June 2009), Plano de Manejo do Parque Estadual das Nascentes do Taquari (PDF), Campo Grande – Mato Grosso do Sul: IMASUL: Instituto do Meio Ambiente de Mato Grosso do Sul, archived from the original (PDF) on 2016-12-20
- "Chapada dos Guimarães", Ambientes Brasil (in Portuguese)
- Guia do Visitante (in Portuguese), ICMBio
- Ken Jennings (27 October 2014), The Center of South America Is in Two Different Spots—Here's Why, Condé Nast
- Parque Nacional da Chapada dos Guimarães (in Portuguese), ICMBio
