= Ancistrus galani =

Scientific classification
- Kingdom: Animalia
- Phylum: Chordata
- Class: Actinopterygii
- Division: Teleostei
- Order: Siluriformes
- Family: Loricariidae
- Genus: Ancistrus
- Species: A. galani

Binomial name
- Ancistrus galani Perez and Viloria, 1994

Species of catfish

Ancistrus galani is a species of freshwater ray-finned fish belonging to the family Loricariidae, the suckermouth armoured catfishes, and the subfamily Hypostominae, the suckermouth catfishes. This catfish is a cavefish which is endemic to Venezuela.

== Taxonomy ==
Ancistrus galani was first formally described in 1994 by the Venezuelan ichthyologists Alfredo Perez Lozano and Ángel L. Viloria, with its type locality given as the Los Laureles cave, Socuy River, Sierra de Perijá, in the state of Zulia, at 10°45'04"N, 72°27'42"W and at an elevation of 650 m (2,130 ft), Venezuela. Eschmeyer's Catalog of Fishes classified the genus Ancistrus in the subfamily Hypostominae, the suckermouth catfishes, within the suckermouth armoured catfish family Loricariidae. It has also been classified in the tribe Ancistrini by some authorities.

== Etymology ==
Ancistrus galani is classified in the genus Ancistrus, a name coined by Rudolf Kner when he proposed the genus, but he did not explain the etymology of the name. It is thought to be from the Greek ágkistron, meaning a "fish hook" or the "hook of a spindle", a reference to the hooked odontodes on the interopercular bone. The specific name, galani, honours the collector of the holotype, the Venezuelan speleologist and biologist Carlos Alberto Galán.

== Description ==
Ancistrus galani reaches a standard length of 5.6 cm (2.2 in). Ancistrus species develop soft, bushy tentacles on the snout when sexually mature. These are better developed in the males than they are in females. Alongside Ancistrus formoso and A. cryptophthalmus, this species displays characteristics unusual among loricariids, such as reduced pigmentation and atrophied eyes, which are adaptations to a subterranean habitat that can be found in various types of cavefish.

== Distribution ==
Ancistrus galani is endemic to Venezuela, where it is only known to occur in the Los Laureles cave in the Socuy River basin, part of the Lake Maracaibo phreatic system.
