= Alcinópolis =

- Municipality
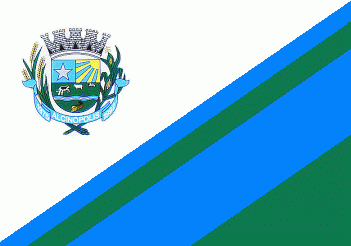
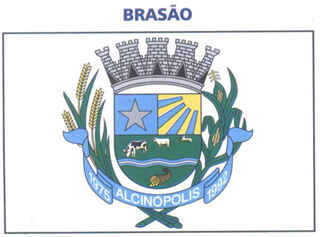
- Flag Coat of arms

- Location in Mato Grosso do Sul state

- Location in Brazil
- Coordinates: 18°19′26″S 53°42′21″W
- Country: Brazil
- Region: Central-West
- State: Mato Grosso do Sul

Area
  - Total: 4,400 km^{2} (1,700 sq mi)
- Elevation: 443 m (1,453 ft)

Population (2020)
  - Total: 5,417
  - Density: 1.2/km^{2} (3.2/sq mi)
- Time zone: UTC−4 (AMT)

Alcinópolis is a municipality located in the Brazilian state of Mato Grosso do Sul. Its population was 5,417 (2020) and its area is 4,400 km^{2} (1,700 sq mi).

The municipality contains 82.7% of the 30,619-hectare (75,660-acre) Nascentes do Rio Taquari State Park, created in 1999.
