= Alegre River (Guaporé) =

Alegre
- Location within Brazil
- Native name: Rio Alegre (Portuguese)

Location
- Country: Brazil

Physical characteristics
- Source
  - location: Serra de Santa Bárbara State Park
- Mouth
  - coordinates: 15.029133°S 59.968345°W

Basin features
- River system: Guaporé River
- Tributaries
  - left: Barbado River

The Alegre River (Portuguese: Rio Alegre) is a river in the state of Mato Grosso, Brazil.

== Course ==
The Alegre River rises in the 120,092 hectares (296,750 acres) Serra de Santa Bárbara State Park, created in 1997. It flows in a generally northwest direction, receiving the Barbado River on its left, then flows north until it joins the Guaporé River from the left.

== See also ==
- List of rivers of Mato Grosso

== Sources ==
- PES Serra de Santa Bárbara (in Portuguese), ISA: Instituto Socioambiental
