= Serra de Santa Bárbara State Park =

State park in Mato Grosso, Brazil

- Parque Estadual Serra de Santa Bárbara
- IUCN category II (national park)
- Location within Brazil
- Nearest city: Pontes e Lacerda, Mato Grosso
- Coordinates: 15°55′30″S 59°21′36″W
- Area: 120,092 hectares (296,750 acres)
- Designation: State park
- Created: 4 November 1997
- Administrator: Coordenadoria de Unidades de Conservação MT

The Serra de Santa Bárbara State Park (Portuguese: Parque Estadual Serra de Santa Bárbara) is a state park in the state of Mato Grosso, Brazil. It preserves a unique environment where the Amazon rainforest, pantanal and cerrado meet, and holds many endemic or endangered species.

== Location ==
The Serra de Santa Bárbara State Park is divided between the municipalities of Porto Esperidião (27.13%) and Pontes e Lacerda (72.87%) in the state of Mato Grosso. It has an area of 120,092 hectares (296,750 acres). It is in the Vale do Guaporé, between the states of Mato Grosso and Rondônia to the north of the border with Bolivia. It covers part of the Serra de Santa Bárbara mountain range including the Serra Monte Cristo, the highest point in the state at 1,023 metres (3,356 ft) above sea level.

The park is in the Pantanal Biosphere Reserve, which also includes the Pantanal, Chapada dos Guimarães, Emas and Serra da Bodoquena national parks, and the Nascentes do Rio Taquari and Pantanal de Rio Negro state parks. The Gomalina, Alegre and Aguapeí rivers rise in the park. Highway MT-473 runs to the west of the park, and highway MT-265 runs to the south. There are several archaeological sites from the precolonial and colonial periods.

== History ==
The Serra de Santa Bárbara State Park was created by decree 1.797 of 4 November 1997 with an area of about 120,092 hectares (296,750 acres) to protect a representative sample of existing ecosystems and to provide an area with opportunities for controlled use by the public. Law 7.165 of 23 August 1999 confirmed the decree. The management plan was approved on 11 December 2008. The consultative council was created on 15 December 2014.

== Environment ==
The Serra de Santa Bárbara has one of the most diverse ecosystems in the state, covering an area of transition between the Amazon rainforest, cerrado and pantanal. The forest types include semi-deciduous seasonal forests, the transition from these to cerrado, cerrado proper, and the transition to rocky fields and to pantanal formations. In the pantanal regions there are large seasonal variations, with most of the area flooded in the rainy season. However, most of the vegetation in the park is cerrado. The areas of Amazon rainforest provide islands and shelters for animals during the floods. The fauna is very rich, and included endemic or endangered species such as Linnaeus's two-toed sloth (Choloepus didactylus), southern tamandua (Tamandua tetradactyla), jaguar (Panthera onca), Amazon river dolphin (Inia geoffrensis) and tucuxi (Sotalia fluviatilis).

Threats include fires, illegal logging and the advance of agriculture around the park. As of 2005 about 3.7% of the park had been deforested, of which 19 square kilometres (7.3 sq mi) had been deforested before creation in 1997, and 25 square kilometres (9.7 sq mi) had been deforested since then.. In 2010 a scheme was uncovered where fraudulently issued titles for land in the park issued by the Instituto Nacional de Colonização e Reforma Agrária (Incra) were being sold to farmers, who would then claim compensation.

== Sources ==
- Alline Marques (20 March 2010), Quadrilha é investigada por grilagem de terras federais (in Portuguese), Internet News Network - Olhar Direto
- Carrijo, Martha GilkaGutiérrez; Torrecilha, Sylvia (June 2009), Plano de Manejo do Parque Estadual das Nascentes do Taquari (PDF), Campo Grande – Mato Grosso do Sul: IMASUL: Instituto do Meio Ambiente de Mato Grosso do Sul
- Parque Estadual da Serra de Santa Bárbara (in Portuguese), Via Rural, archived from the original on August 6, 2016
- PES Serra de Santa Bárbara (in Portuguese), ISA: Instituto Socioambiental
- Roberta dos Santos; Laurent Micol; Gustavo Irgang; Jane Vasconcellos (September 2006), O desmatamento nas Unidades de Conservação em Mato Grosso (PDF) (in Portuguese), Alta Floresta e Cuiabá: Instituto Centro de Vida, archived from the original (PDF) on 2016-09-24
- Unidades de Conservação correm risco de desaparecer em Mato Grosso (in Portuguese), EcoViagem, 28 March 2003
