= Gomalina River =

- Location within Brazil
- Native name: Rio Gomalina (Portuguese)

Location
- Country: Brazil

Physical characteristics
- Source
  - location: Serra de Santa Bárbara State Park
- Mouth
  - location: Vila Bela da Santíssima Trindade, Mato Grosso
  - coordinates: 15.561238°S 60.015358°W

Basin features
- River system: Barbado River

The Gomalina River (Portuguese: Rio Gomalina) is a river in the state of Mato Grosso, Brazil.

== Course ==
The Gomalina River rises in the 120,092 hectares (296,750 acres) Serra de Santa Bárbara State Park, created in 1997. It flows in a generally northwest direction until it meets the Barbado River.

== See also ==
- List of rivers of Mato Grosso

== Sources ==
- PES Serra de Santa Bárbara (in Portuguese), ISA: Instituto Socioambiental
