= Umbyquyra =

Scientific classification
- Kingdom: Animalia
- Phylum: Arthropoda
- Subphylum: Chelicerata
- Class: Arachnida
- Order: Araneae
- Infraorder: Mygalomorphae
- Family: Theraphosidae
- Genus: Umbyquyra; Gargiulo, Brescovit & Lucas, 2018

Type species
- U. paranaiba Gargiulo, Brescovit & Lucas, 2018

Species
- 12, see text

Genus of spiders

Umbyquyra is a genus of South American tarantulas first described in 2018 by Gargiulo, Brescovit & Lucas. They are found exclusively in Brazil and Bolivia. The name Umbyquyra derives from the words "pointed bird beak" in the native Tupi language, which makes reference to the palpal bulb.

== Description ==
The species of this genus range from 18 to 24 cm. Usually they are dark brown in coloration, with legs that are a lighter shade of brown. The side of their abdomens are usually covered in reddish or golden hairs. All of them have eight eyes, ringed with black coloration.

== Species ==
As of December 2024 it contains twelve species:

- Umbyquyra acuminata (Schmidt & Tesmoingt, 2005) — Bolivia, Brazil
- Umbyquyra araguaia Gargiulo, Brescovit & Lucas, 2018 — Brazil
- Umbyquyra belterra Gargiulo, Brescovit & Lucas, 2018 — Brazil
- Umbyquyra caxiuana Gargiulo, Brescovit & Lucas, 2018 — Brazil
- Umbyquyra cuiaba Gargiulo, Brescovit & Lucas, 2018 — Brazil
- Umbyquyra gurleyi sherwood & Gabriel, 2020 – Brazil
- Umbyquyra palmarum (Schiapelli & Gerschman, 1945) — Brazil
- Umbyquyra paranaiba Gargiulo, Brescovit & Lucas, 2018 — Brazil
- Umbyquyra sapezal Gargiulo, Brescovit & Lucas, 2018 — Brazil
- Umbyquyra schmidti (Rudloff, 1996) — Brazil
- Umbyquyra tapajos Gargiulo, Brescovit & Lucas, 2018 — Brazil
- Umbyquyra tucurui Gargiulo, Brescovit & Lucas, 2018 — Brazil
