= Costa Rica, Mato Grosso do Sul =

Municipality in Mato Grosso do Sul, Brazil

Costa Rica
- Municipality
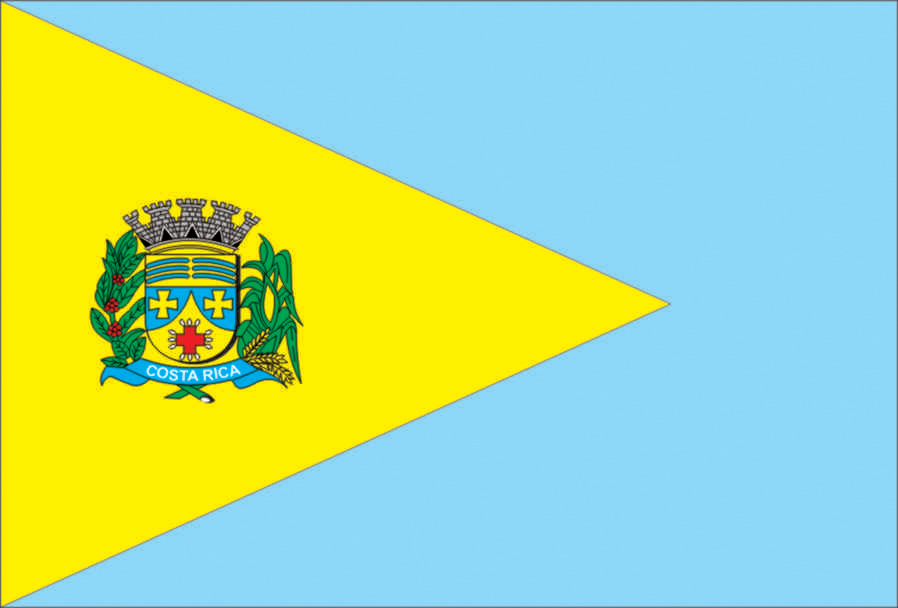
- Flag Coat of arms

- Location in Mato Grosso do Sul state

- Location in Brazil
- Coordinates: 18°31′38″S 53°57′42″W
- Country: Brazil
- Region: Central-West
- State: Mato Grosso do Sul

Area
  - Total: 5,723 km^{2} (2,210 sq mi)

Population (2020)
  - Total: 21,142
  - Density: 3.694/km^{2} (9.568/sq mi)
- Time zone: UTC−4 (AMT)

Costa Rica is a municipality located in the Brazilian state of Mato Grosso do Sul. Its population was 21,142 (2020) and its area is 5,723 km^{2} (2,210 sq mi).

The municipality contains 17.3% of the 30,619 hectares (75,660 acres) Nascentes do Rio Taquari State Park, created in 1999.

== See also ==
- Costa Rica (country in Central America)
