= Pantanal Matogrossense National Park =

National park in Brazil

- Parque Nacional do Pantanal Matogrossense
- IUCN category II (national park)
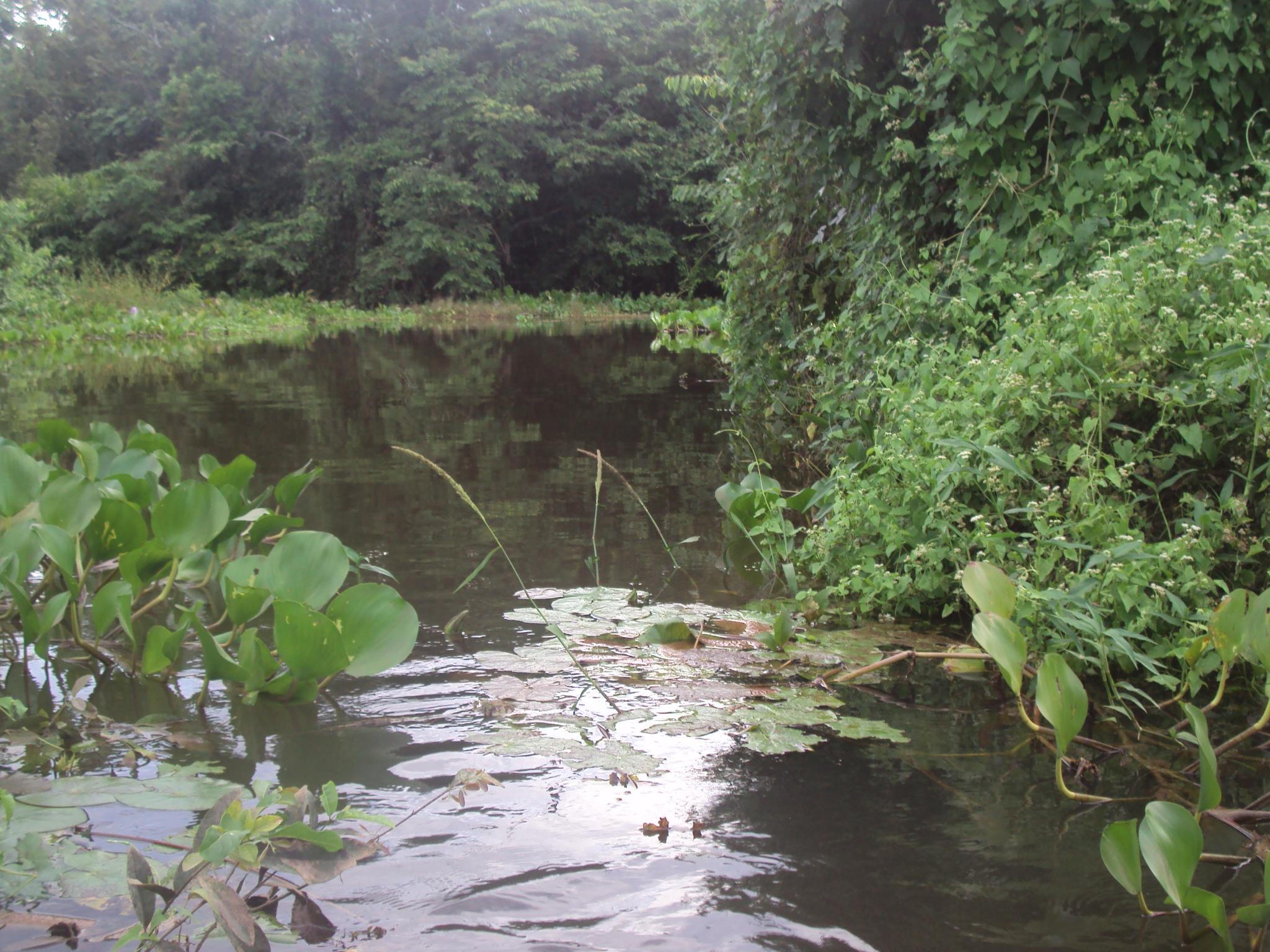
- The Cuiabá River and wetlands

- Location within Brazil
- Nearest city: Corumbá, Mato Grosso do Sul
- Coordinates: 17°40′19″S 57°26′42″W
- Area: 135,606 hectares (335,090 acres)
- Designation: National park
- Created: 24 September 1981
- Administrator: ICMBio

Ramsar Wetland
- Official name: Pantanal Matogrossense
- Designated: 24 May 1993
- Reference no.: 602

The Pantanal Matogrossense National Park (Portuguese: Parque Nacional do Pantanal Matogrossense) is a national park in the state of Mato Grosso at the border to Mato Grosso do Sul, Brazil.

== Location ==
Pantanal Matogrossense National Park has an area of 135,606 hectares (335,090 acres). It is in the Pantanal biome. The park was created by decree nº 86.392 on 24 September 1981, and is managed by the Chico Mendes Institute for Biodiversity Conservation (ICMBio). It covers parts of the municipalities of Corumbá in Mato Grosso do Sul, and Cáceres and Poconé in Mato Grosso. It adjoins the Guirá State Park to the north. The Cuiabá River runs through Pantanal Matogrossense National Park. The park is in the Pantanal Biosphere Reserve, which also includes the Chapada dos Guimarães, Emas and Serra da Bodoquena national parks, and the Serra de Santa Bárbara and Nascentes do Rio Taquari, Pantanal de Rio Negro state parks.

== Conservation ==
The park is classed as IUCN protected area category II (national park). The park's basic objective is preservation of natural ecosystems of great ecological relevance and scenic beauty and enabling scientific research, environmental education, outdoor recreation and ecological tourism. The park was listed as a "Wetland of International Importance" under the Ramsar Convention in 1993.

Protected species include the jaguar (Panthera onca), ocelot (Leopardus pardalis), marsh deer (Blastocerus dichotomus), giant anteater (Myrmecophaga tridactyla), giant armadillo (Priodontes maximus), giant otter (Pteronura brasiliensis), chestnut-bellied guan (Penelope ochrogaster), black-and-tawny seedeater (Sporophila nigrorufa) and the mussel Lamproscapha ensiformis.

== Sources ==
- Carrijo, Martha GilkaGutiérrez; Torrecilha, Sylvia (June 2009), Plano de Manejo do Parque Estadual das Nascentes do Taquari (PDF), Campo Grande – Mato Grosso do Sul: IMASUL: Instituto do Meio Ambiente de Mato Grosso do Sul, archived from the original (PDF) on 20 December 2016
- Parna do Pantanal Mato-grossense (in Portuguese), Chico Mendes Institute for Biodiversity Conservation
- PES do Guirá (in Portuguese), ISA: Instituto Socioambiental
- Ramsar List, Ramsar.org
- Unidade de Conservação: Parque Nacional do Pantanal Matogrossense (in Portuguese), MMA: Ministério do Meio Ambiente
