= Ancistrus cryptophthalmus =

Conservation status
- Endangered (IUCN 3.1)

Scientific classification
- Kingdom: Animalia
- Phylum: Chordata
- Class: Actinopterygii
- Order: Siluriformes
- Family: Loricariidae
- Genus: Ancistrus
- Species: A. cryptophthalmus

Binomial name
- Ancistrus cryptophthalmus Reis, 1987

Species of catfish

Ancistrus cryptophthalmus is a species of freshwater ray-finned fish belonging to the family Loricariidae, the suckermouth armoured catfishes, and the subfamily Hypostominae, the suckermouth catfishes. This catfish is a cavefish which is endemic to Brazil.

== Taxonomy ==
Ancistrus cryptophthalmus was first formally described in 1987 by the Brazilian ichthyologist Roberto Esser dos Reis with its type locality given as the Passa Três Cave, around 300 m (980 ft) into the cave, at 13°20' to 13°52'S, 46°16' to 46°30'W, São Vicente River system, São Domingos in the Brazilian state of Goiás. Eschmeyer's Catalog of Fishes classified the genus Ancistrus in the subfamily Hypostominae, the suckermouth catfishes, within the suckermouth armored catfish family Loricariidae. It has also been classified in the tribe Ancistrini by some authorities.

== Etymology ==
Ancistrus cryptophthalmus is classified in the genus Ancistrus, a name coined by Rudolf Kner when he proposed the genus but Kner did not explain the etymology of the name. It is thought to be from the Greek ágkistron, meaning a "fish hook" or the "hook of a spindle", a reference to the hooked odontodes on the interopercular bone. The specific name, cryptophthalmus, means "hidden eye", an allusion to the eyes being covered by skin and bony plates.

== Description ==
Ancistrus cryptophthalmus reaches a standard length of 6 cm (2.4 in). Ancistrus species develop soft, bushy tentacles on the snout when sexually mature, these are better developed in the males than they are in females. Alongside Ancistrus galani and A. formoso, this species displays characteristics unusual among loricariids, such as reduced pigmentation and atrophied eyes, which are adaptations to a subterranean habitat that can be found in various types of cavefish.

== Distribution and habit ==
Ancistrus cryptophthalmus is endemic to Brazil where it occurs in the caves of Lapa da Angélica and Lapa do Bezerra, these caves being part of the Angélica-Bezerra system and Lapa São Vicente I and Lapa do Passa Três in the São Vicente system, in the karst area of São Domingos, upper Tocantins River basin, municipality of São Domingos in the state of Goiás. The Angélica-Bezerra system and the São Vicente system are parallel to each other and independently cross the karst area before emptying into the Paranã River, there is no underground link between the systems. This species is found in caves, especially in subterranean rapids.

== Conservation status ==
Ancistrus cryptophthalmus has been found in just two karstic cave systems which are unconnected and the two subpopulations show morphologival differences to each other. In the Bezerra cave the river has become very silted up as a result of deforestation upstream form the cave, degrading the habitat and reducing the availability of food while in the Angelica cave there is a high number of visitors, also which also degrades the habitat. The International Union for Conservation of Nature has classified A. cryptophthalmus as Endangered.
