= Nascentes do Rio Taquari State Park =

State park in Mato Grosso do Sul, Brazil

- Parque Estadual das Nascentes do Taquari
- IUCN category II (national park)
- Location within Brazil
- Nearest city: Alcinópolis, Mato Grosso do Sul
- Coordinates: 18.159444°S 53.411105°W
- Area: 30,619 hectares (75,660 acres)
- Designation: State park
- Created: 9 October 1999
- Administrator: Superintendência de Meio Ambiente e Recursos Hídricos

The Nascentes do Rio Taquari State Park (Portuguese: Parque Estadual das Nascentes do Taquari) is a state park in the state of Mato Grosso do Sul, Brazil. It protects the headwaters of the Taquari River in an area in the transition between the cerrado and pantanal biomes.

== Location ==
The Nascentes do Rio Taquari State Park is divided between the municipalities of Alcinópolis (82.7%) and Costa Rica (17.3%) in Mato Grosso do Sul. It has an area of 30,619 hectares (75,660 acres). The buffer zone covers 89,744.73 hectares (221,764.1 acres). The park contains parts of the Paraguay and Paraná river basins, and is near the watershed of the Araguaia River. It is between the chapadão and the pré-pantanal regions on the border between Mato Grosso do Sul, Mato Grosso and Goiás, and protects the sources of the Taquari River, considered the most degraded river in the pantanal basin of Mato Grosso do Sul.

The park contains six large canyons formed over millions of years in the Chapadão de Baús on the western edge of the Brazilian central plateau. The park has archaeological sites that date back 11,000 years, with traces in caves of ancient rock paintings and petroglyphs. The park has great scenic beauty, and high potential for ecotourism, environmental education and research. The management plan, published in June 2009, defined zones of usage for the park. About 50% is defined as having minimal human intervention, with restricted visitation.

The Nascentes do Rio Taquari State Park is in the Pantanal Biosphere Reserve, which also includes the Pantanal, Chapada dos Guimarães, Emas and Serra da Bodoquena national parks, and the Serra de Santa Bárbara and Pantanal de Rio Negro state parks. It protects an important ecological corridor between the cerrado and the pantanal. Vegetation is in the cerrado biome, and includes seasonal forests and cerradão. Conflicting activities include plowing with intensive use of agrochemicals, mining, roads, transmission lines and homes in the park.

== History ==
The Nascentes do Rio Taquari State Park was created by state decree 9.662 of 9 October 1999 with the objective of preserving the ecosystems, flora and fauna of the area, maintaining the watershed, cultural heritage and landscape, and supporting recreation and tourism in contact with nature. Implementation of the park was made as a compensatory measure by the railway company Ferrovia Norte-Brasil (FERRONORTE) for engaging in work that had an environmental impact in the state. Decree 9.663 of 9 October 1999 provided for expropriation of privately owned lands in the state park, with the expense of compensation to be born by FERRONORTE.

Before the park was created all the land was privately owned. The process of acquiring the properties did not begin until 2007, with indemnification starting in March 2008. As of 2010 only 10% of the area of the park had been formally acquired by the state. The landowners were continuing activities such as cattle raising while negotiations over land value continued.

== Sources ==
- Carrijo, Martha GilkaGutiérrez; Torrecilha, Sylvia (June 2009), Plano de Manejo do Parque Estadual das Nascentes do Taquari (PDF), Campo Grande – Mato Grosso do Sul: IMASUL: Instituto do Meio Ambiente de Mato Grosso do Sul, archived from the original (PDF) on 2016-12-20
- Lucianer, Bruna (20 September 2010), "Parque Estadual das Nascentes do Taquari: um passo para recuperar o rio", Correio do Estado (in Portuguese)
- "Parque Estadual das Nascentes do Taquari", Eu Conto Tudo (in Portuguese), archived from the original on 2016-12-20
- PES das Nascentes do Rio Taquari (in Portuguese), ISA: Instituto Socioambiental
