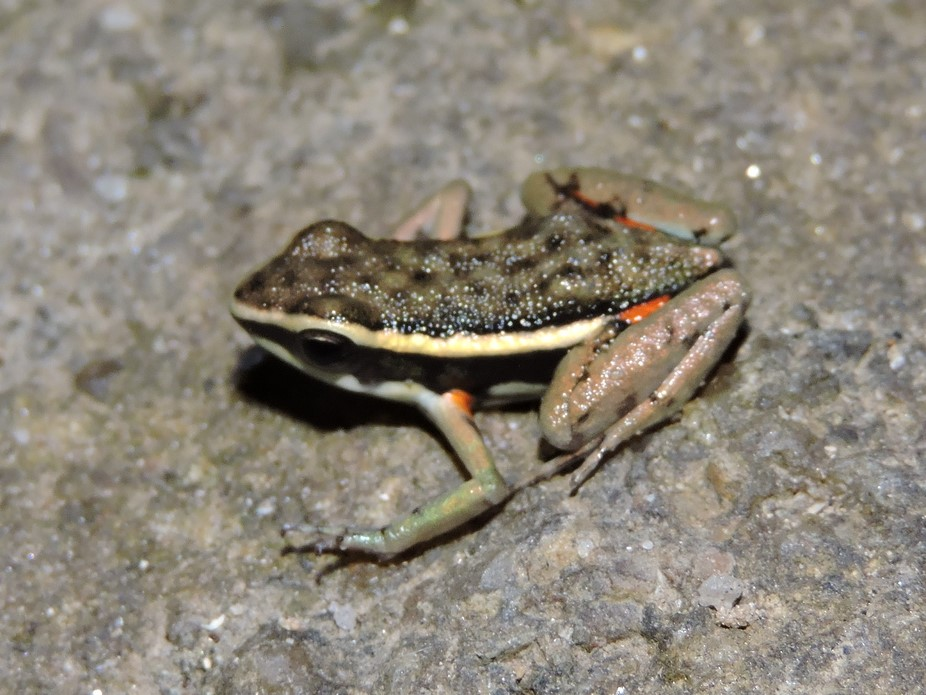

Conservation status
- Least Concern (IUCN 3.1)

Scientific classification
- Kingdom: Animalia
- Phylum: Chordata
- Class: Amphibia
- Order: Anura
- Family: Dendrobatidae
- Genus: Ameerega
- Species: A. berohoka

Binomial name
- Ameerega berohoka Vaz-Silva & Maciel, 2011

= Ameerega berohoka =

Species of amphibian

Ameerega berohoka is a species of poison dart frog that is endemic to Goiás and Mato Grosso in Brazil.

== Description ==
The adult male frog measures 19.2 to 23.4 mm long in snout-vent length and the adult female frog 21.9 to 24.3 mm. It has disks on the toes for climbing and no webbed skin. There are bright orange spots on the hind legs and groin. There are light yellow stripes on both sides of the body. The sides of the body are black in color and the venter is white or blue in color. Scientists note its aposematic coloration. The pupil of the eye is round in shape.

== Etymology ==
The name berohoka means "big river" in the Karajas language.

== Habitat ==
It can be found near the Araguaia River and near Itiquira. It can be found in cerrado biome, open and forested areas, and cultivated lands. It is associated with Brachiaria grasses. It is especially known in the sub-basins below the Araguaia River. Most sightings of the frog have taken place between 200 and 500 meters above sea level.

The frog's known range includes one protected area: Parque Estadual Serra Azul. It has also been found near Emas National Park.

== Reproduction ==
Scientists infer that this frog has the same breeding habits as other frogs in Ameerega: The female frog lays eggs on the leaf litter. After the eggs hatch, the male frog carries the tadpoles to water.

== Threats ==
The IUCN classifies this frog as least concern of extinction. What threat it faces comes from habitat loss associated with agriculture, livestock grazing, and charcoal. The construction of hydroelectric dams also poses a threat because it changes the subbasins below the Araguaia River.

== Original publication ==
- Vaz-Silva W; Medeiros Maciel N. (2011). "A new cryptic species of Ameerega (Anura: Dendrobatidae) from Brazilian Cerrado". Zootaxa. 2826: 57–68.
