= Bioparque Los Ocarros =

Zoo in Villavicencio, Colombia

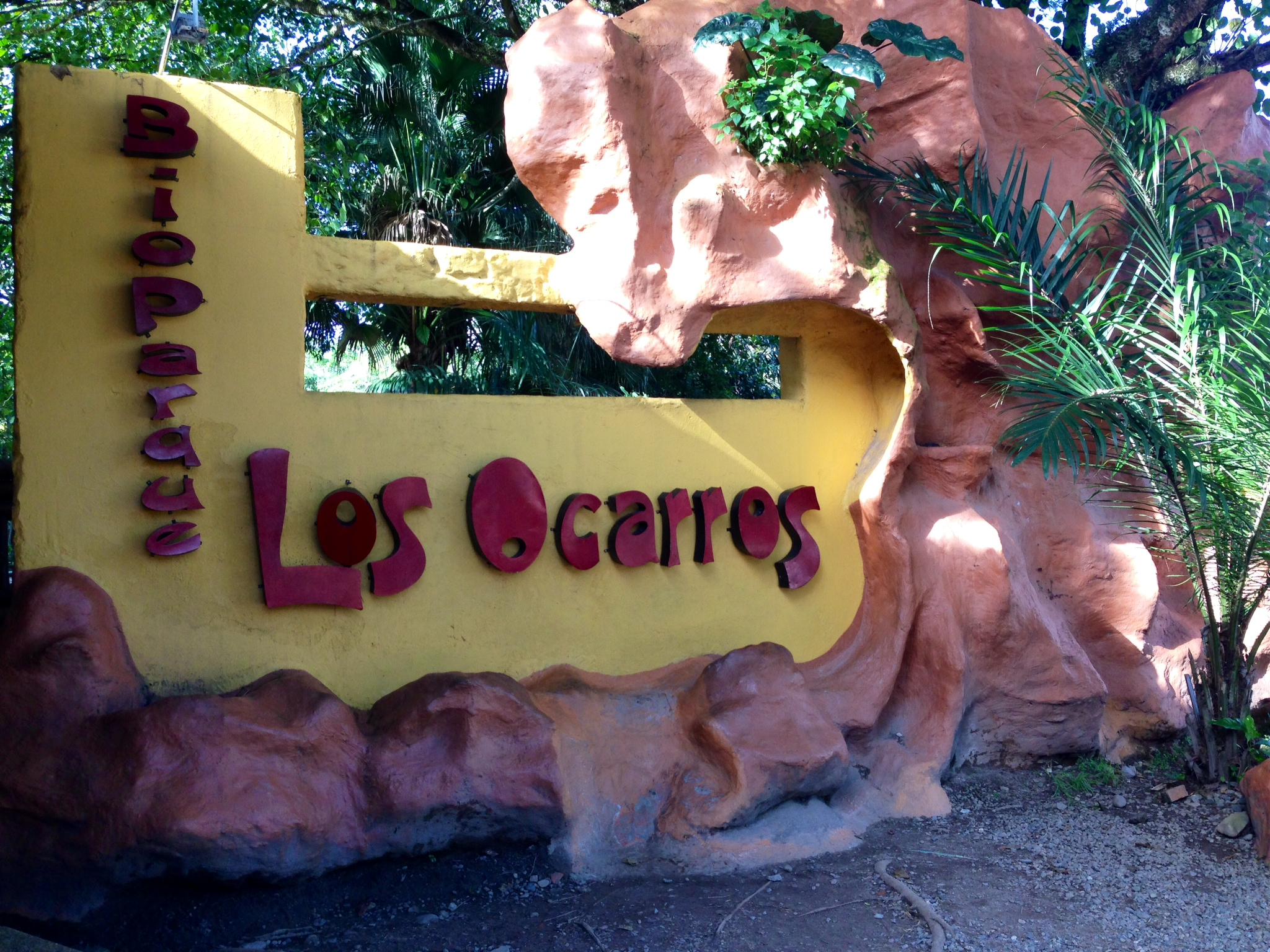
- Logo
- Interactive map of Bioparque Los Ocarros
- 4°11′06.18″N 73°36′31.2″W
- Date opened: 2003
- Location: Villavicencio, Meta, Colombia
- Land area: 5.5 hectares (14 acres)
- No. of species: 181
- Major exhibits: 38

Bioparque Los Ocarros or Los Ocarros is a zoo park located in the city of Villavicencio in Colombia. The biopark houses animals of the region and works closely with the environmental authorities to preserve the local fauna.

The zoo's 5.5 hectares (14 acres) are divided into 7 different sections with 38 habitats that are home to about 181 species of animals. The biological park also has an artificial lake that is home to a variety of turtles, fish and birds.

== Gallery ==
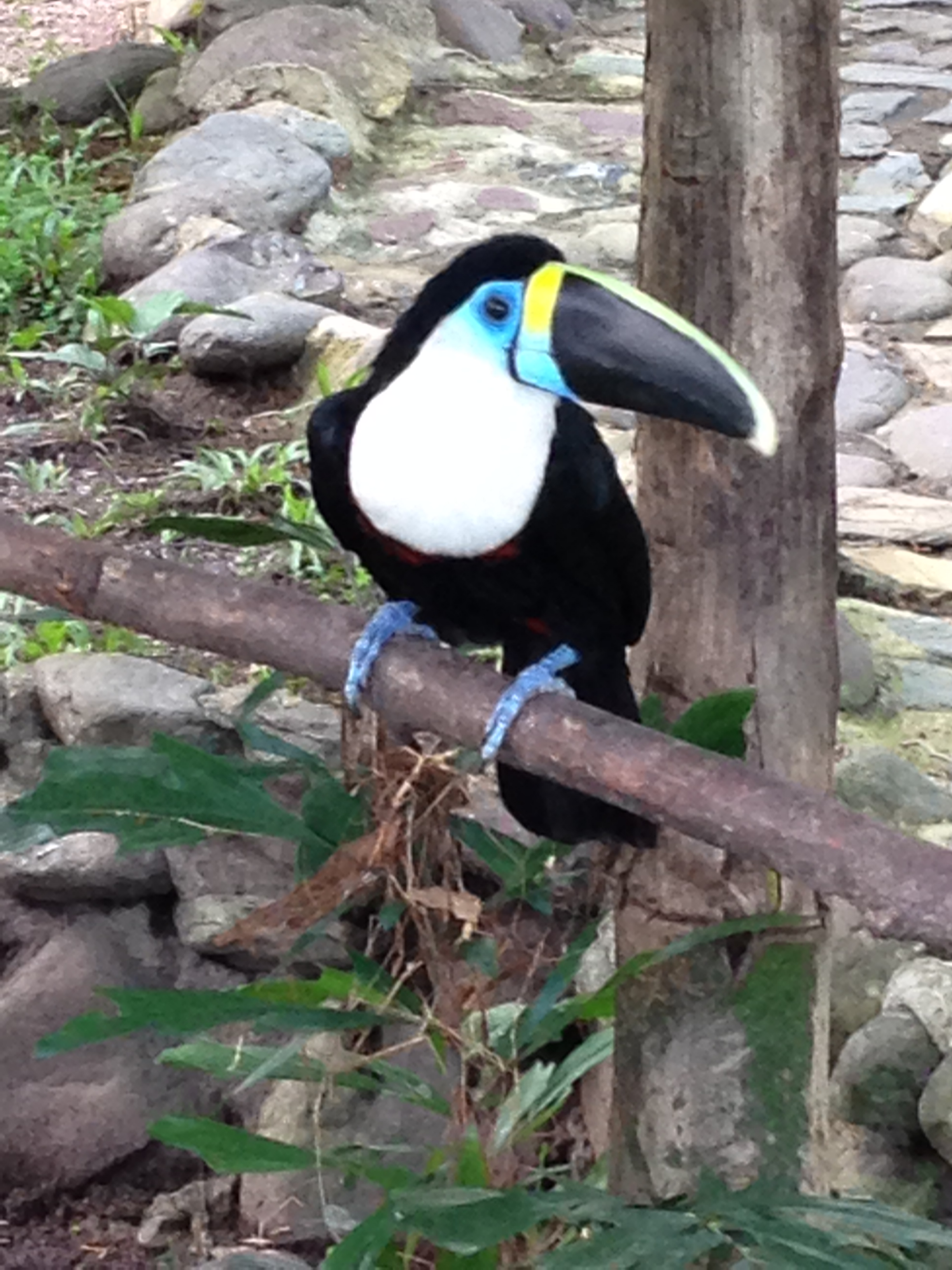
A Ramphastos tucanus at the toucan exhibit

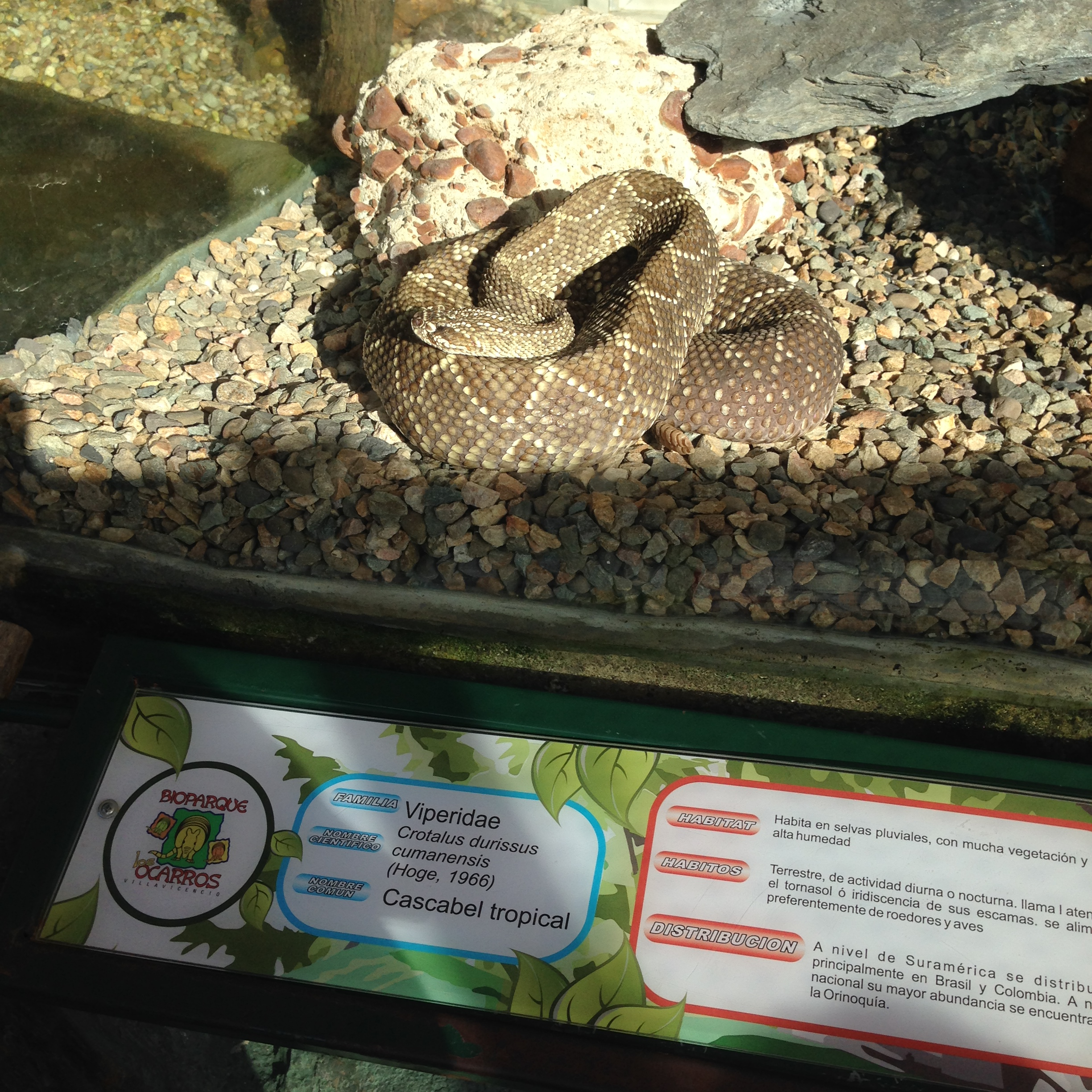
A Crotalus durissus at the snake exhibit

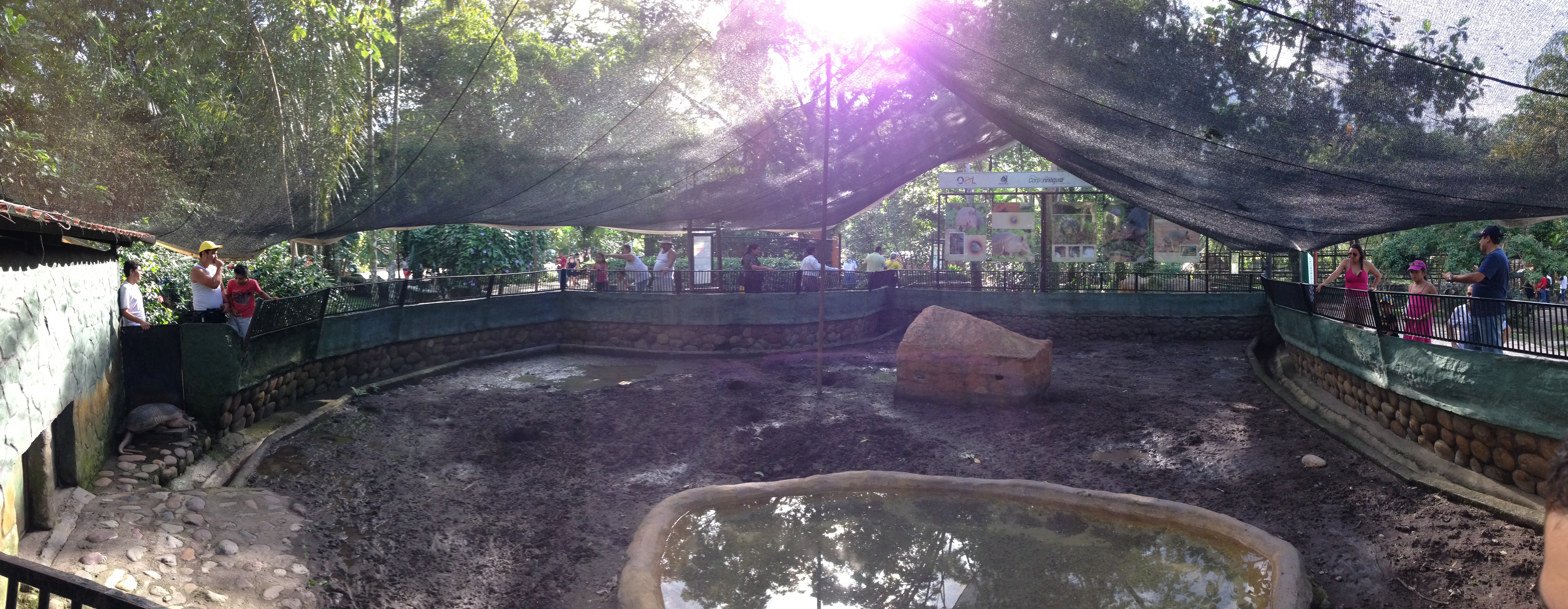
A giant armadillo enclosure

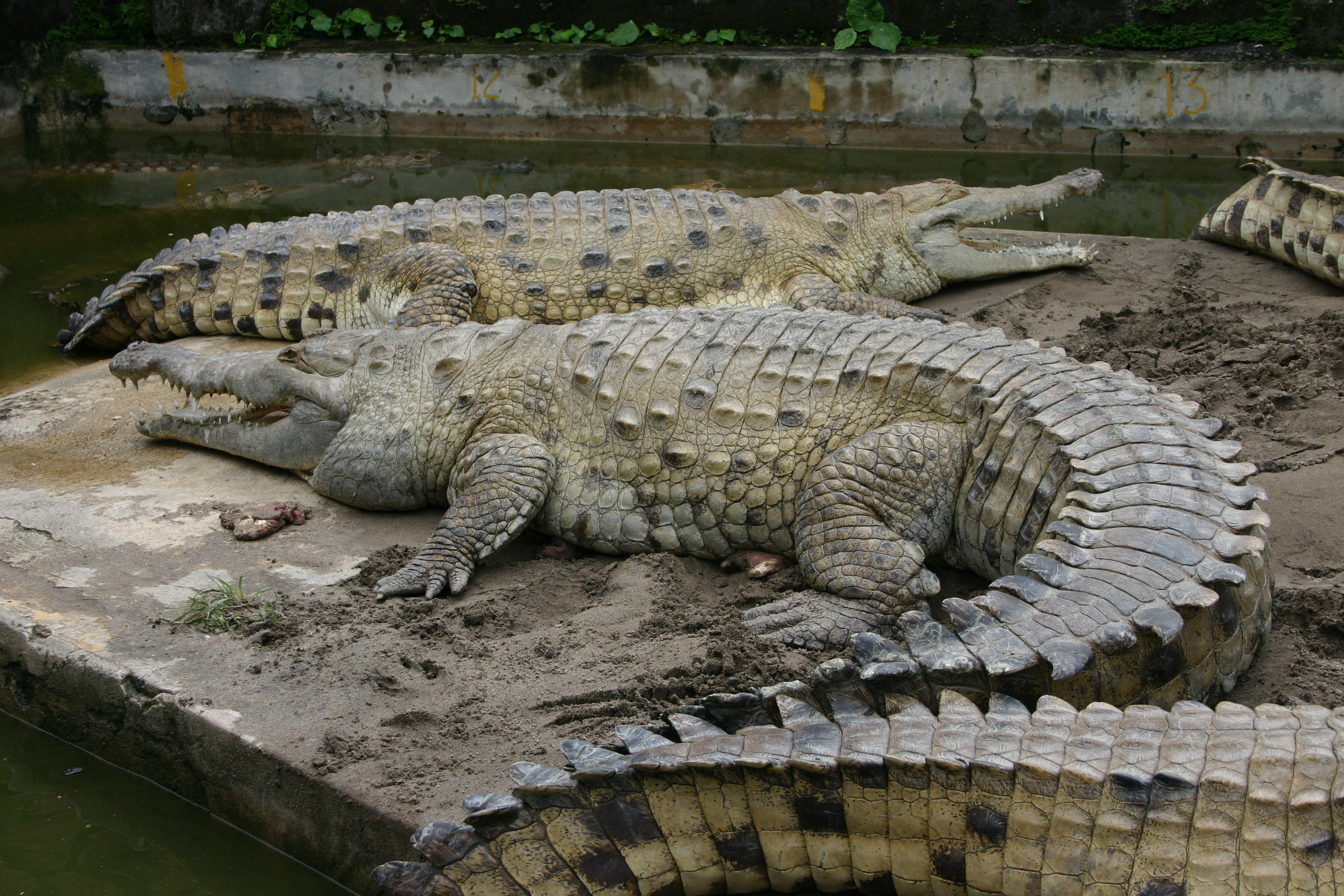
Orinoco crocodiles

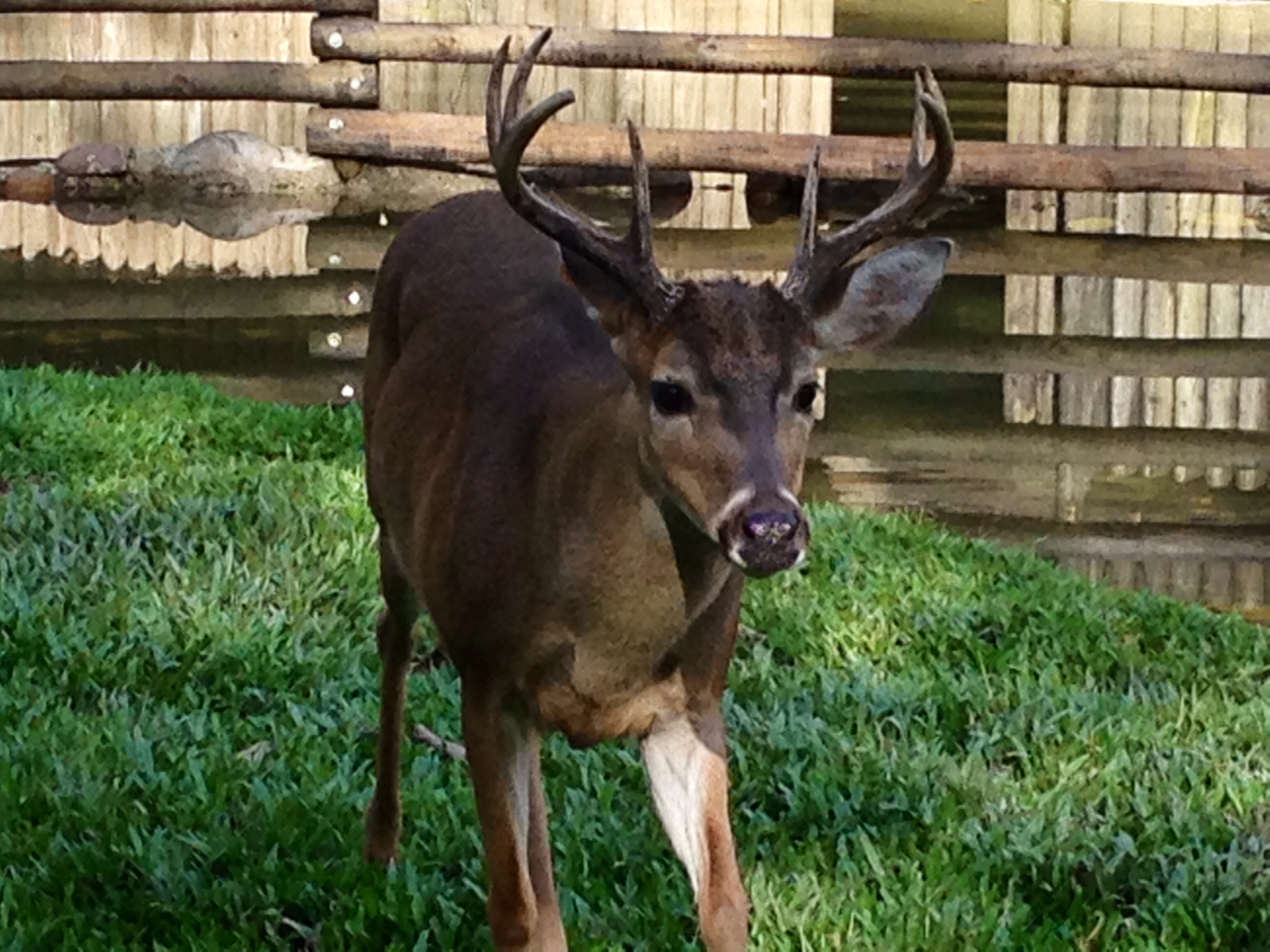
White-tailed deer

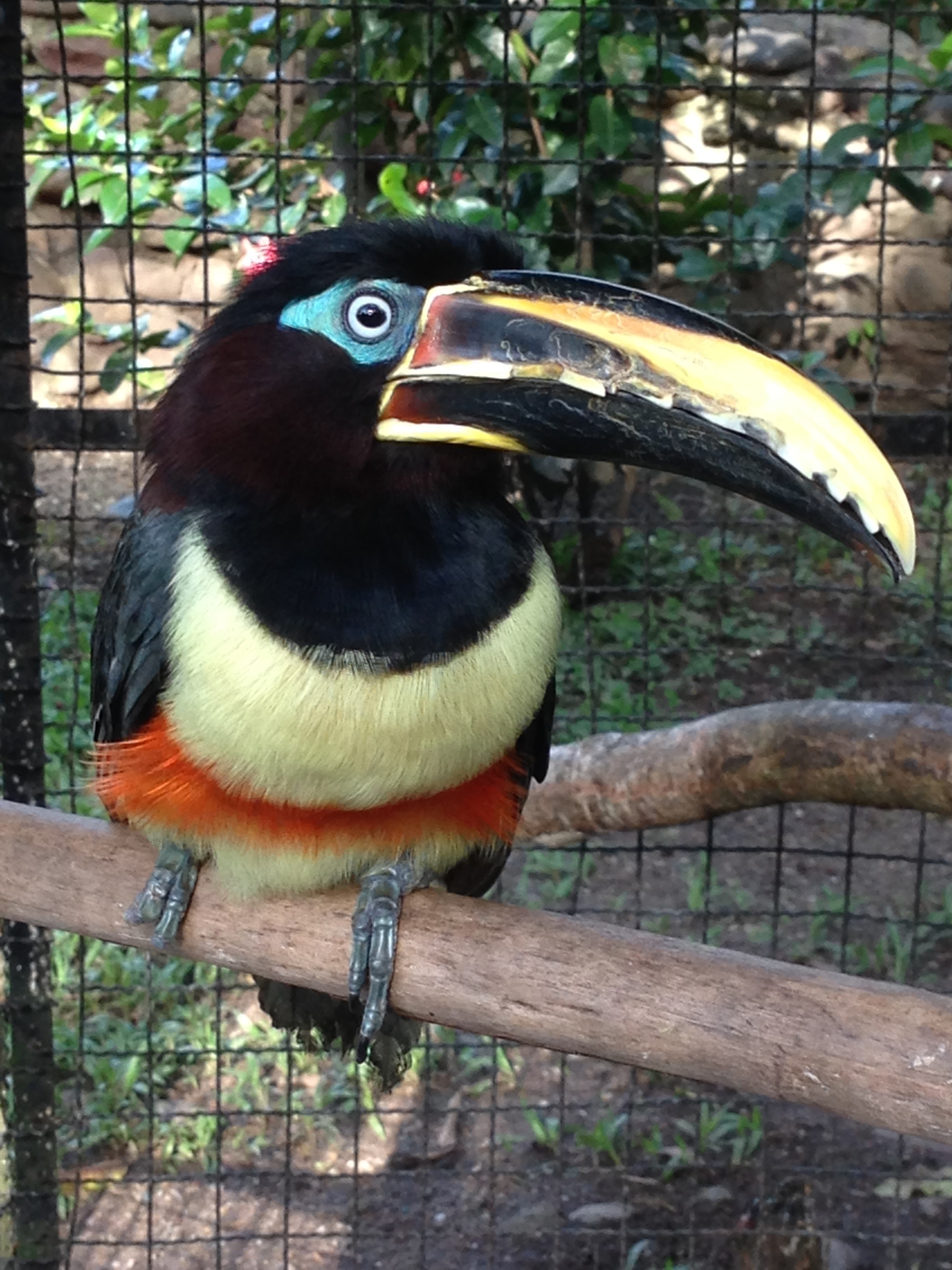
Chestnut-eared aracari at the toucan exhibit
