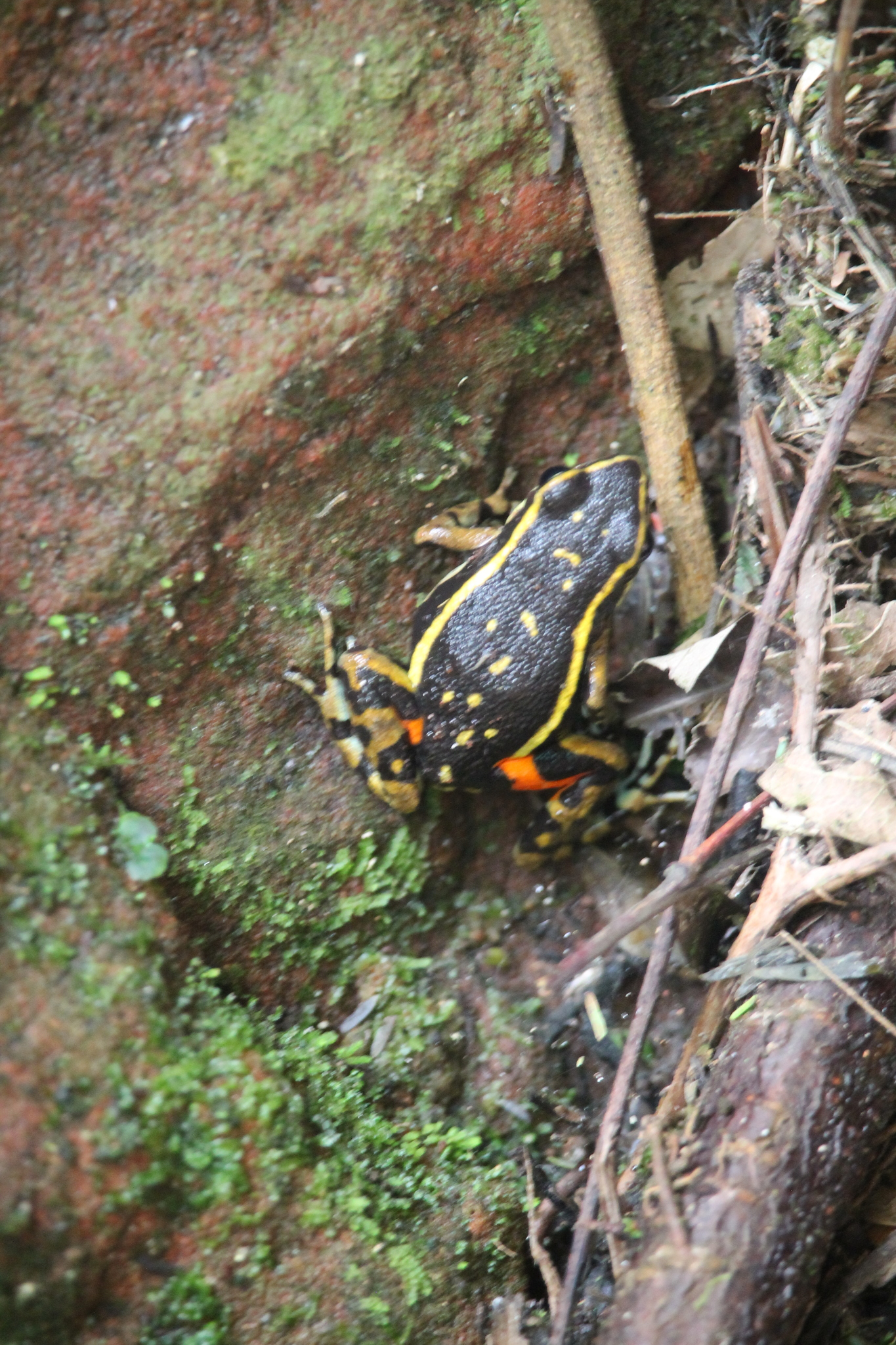

Conservation status
- Endangered (IUCN 3.1)

Scientific classification
- Kingdom: Animalia
- Phylum: Chordata
- Class: Amphibia
- Order: Anura
- Family: Dendrobatidae
- Genus: Ameerega
- Species: A. boehmei

Binomial name
- Ameerega boehmei Lötters, Schmitz, Reichle, Rödder, and Quennet, 2009

= Ameerega boehmei =

Species of frog

Ameerega boehmei is a species of frog in the family Dendrobatidae. It is endemic to the Chiquitania region in the Santa Cruz Department, Bolivia, where it is known from two isolated sandstone massifs, Serranía de Santiago and Serranía de Chochis. It is similar to Ameerega flavopicta and has been confused with that species. The specific name boehmei honors Wolfgang Böhme, for "his support of the scientific careers of all authors from early days on". Common name Boehmei's poison arrow frog has been proposed for this species. (Note: boehmei being the genitive of "Böhme", a more logical common name would be "Böhme's poison arrow frog")

== Description ==
Adults measure 19–35 mm (0.7–1.4 in) in snout–vent length; although the largest specimen was a female, males and females do not differ in size overall. The body is slender and the head is narrower than the body. The snout is rounded. The tympanum is distinct. The fingers and toes have no webbing. Skin is dorsally slightly granular. The dorsal background color is black. There are bright yellow dorsolateral and labial lines as well as mid-dorsal spots and/or dots. The limbs are brown with black or black with bright yellow markings. The ventral surfaces are light grey to light brown with black marbling.

The male advertisement call is a series of indistinctly pulsed, upward modulated notes. The dominant frequency is about 2.7–3.2 kHz.

== Habitat and conservation ==
Ameerega boehmei are associated with rocky areas of open Cerrado grassland at elevations of 500–1,200 m (1,600–3,900 ft) above sea level. They are diurnal and commonly occur close to slowly running streams, but can also be found as far as 50 m from a waterbody. Reproduction appears to take place during the wet season in November–April. The eggs are deposited on land. The adults will later transport the tadpoles to shallow pools and temporary puddles where they develop further.

This species can be locally abundant, but some populations appear to have declined. It is threatened by fires, which are used for improving and expanding pasture land for cattle. It occurs in Tucavaca Valley Municipal Reserve.
