= Serra da Bodoquena National Park =

National park in Mato Grosso do Sul, Brazil

- Parque Nacional da Serra da Bodoquena
- IUCN category II (national park)
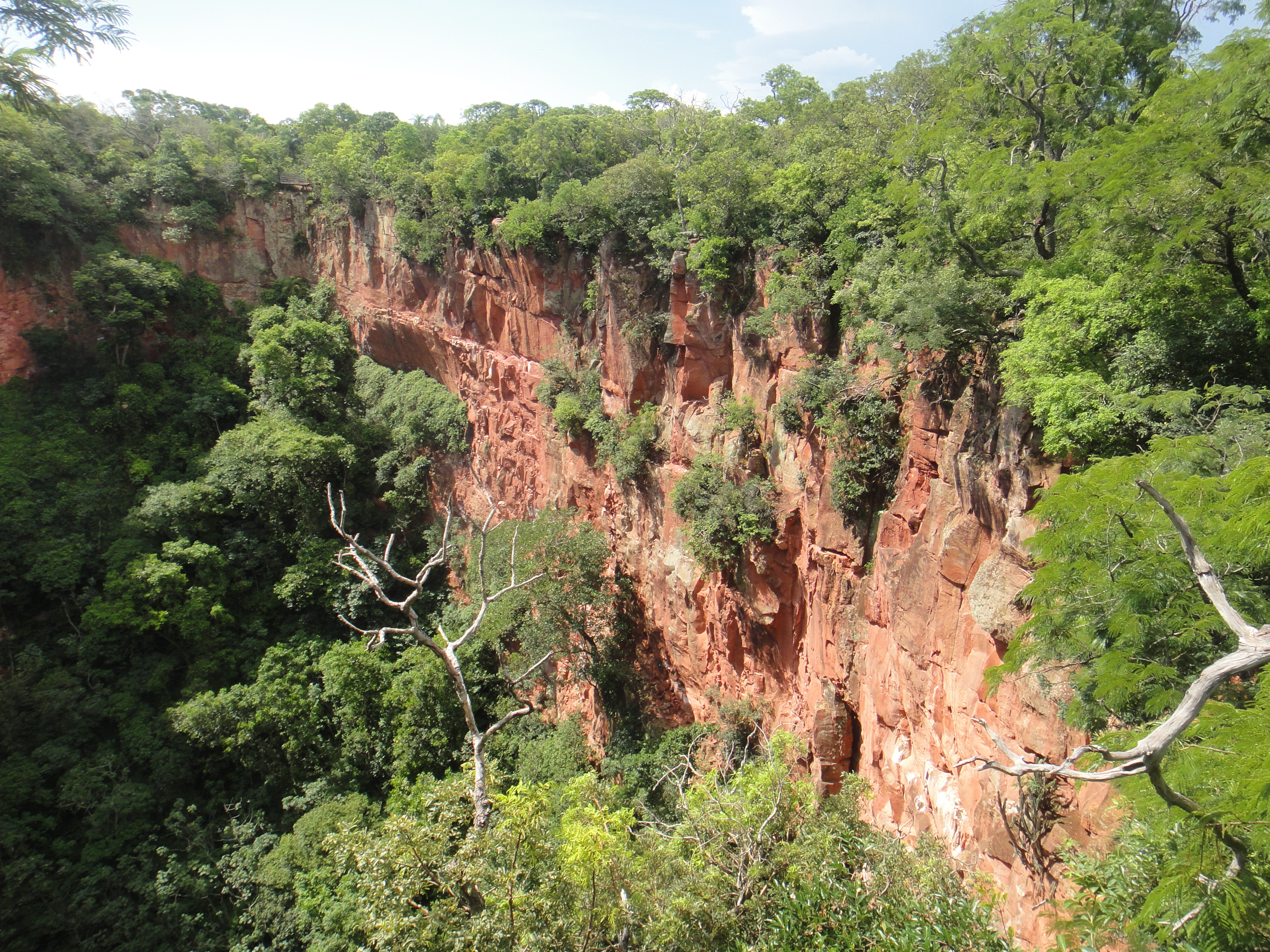
- Serra da Bodoquena

- Location within Brazil
- Nearest city: Bonito, Mato Grosso do Sul
- Coordinates: 21°14′24″S 56°41′49″W
- Area: 77,022 hectares (190,330 acres)
- Designation: National park
- Created: 21 September 2000
- Administrator: ICMBio

Serra da Bodoquena National Park (Portuguese: Parque Nacional da Serra da Bodoquena) is a national park in the state of Mato Grosso do Sul, Brazil.

== Location ==
The park belongs to the cerrado biome. It covers an area of 77,022 hectares (190,330 acres), was created on 21 September 2000 and is administered by the Chico Mendes Institute for Biodiversity Conservation. The park is in the Pantanal Biosphere Reserve, which also includes the Pantanal, Chapada dos Guimarães and Emas national parks, and the Serra de Santa Bárbara, Nascentes do Rio Taquari and Pantanal de Rio Negro state parks. It covers parts of the municipalities of Porto Murtinho, Jardim, Bonito and Bodoquena, Mato Grosso do Sul.

== Conservation ==
The park is classified as IUCN protected area category II (national park). It has the objectives of preserving natural ecosystems of great ecological relevance and scenic beauty, enabling scientific research, environmental education, outdoors recreation and eco-tourism. Protected species include the catfish Ancistrus formoso, Jaguar (Panthera onca), and cougar (Puma concolor).

== Sources ==
- Carrijo, Martha GilkaGutiérrez; Torrecilha, Sylvia (June 2009), Plano de Manejo do Parque Estadual das Nascentes do Taquari (PDF), Campo Grande – Mato Grosso do Sul: IMASUL: Instituto do Meio Ambiente de Mato Grosso do Sul
- Parque Nacional da Serra da Bodoquena (in Portuguese), Chico Mendes Institute for Biodiversity Conservation, archived from the original on 2016-03-03
- Unidade de Conservação: Parque Nacional da Serra da Bodoquena (in Portuguese), MMA: Ministério do Meio Ambiente
