= Ancistrus formoso =

Conservation status
- Vulnerable (IUCN 3.1)

Scientific classification
- Kingdom: Animalia
- Phylum: Chordata
- Class: Actinopterygii
- Order: Siluriformes
- Family: Loricariidae
- Genus: Ancistrus
- Species: A. formoso

Binomial name
- Ancistrus formoso Sabino & Trajano, 1997

Species of fish

Ancistrus formoso is a species of freshwater ray-finned fish belonging to the family Loricariidae, the suckermouth armoured catfishes, and the subfamily Hypostominae, the suckermouth catfishes. This catfish is a cavefish which is endemic to Brazil.

== Taxonomy ==
Ancistrus formoso was first formally described in 1997 by the Brazilian ichthyologists José Sabino and Eleanora Trajano with its type locality given as the Buraco do Ducho cave, in the Serra da Bodoquena, Bonito, at 21°08'S, 56°28'W, in the Brazilian state of Mato Grosso do Sul. Eschmeyer's Catalog of Fishes classified the genus Ancistrus in the subfamily Hypostominae, the suckermouth catfishes, within the suckermouth armored catfish family Loricariidae. It has also been classified in the tribe Ancistrini by some authorities.

== Etymology ==
Ancistrus formoso is classified in the genus Ancistrus, a name coined by Rudolf Kner when he proposed the genus but Kner did not explain the etymology of the name. It is thought to be from the Greek ágkistron, meaning a "fish hook" or the "hook of a spindle", a reference to the hooked odontodes on the interopercular bone. The specific name, formoso, refers to the Formoso groundwater system in the Formoso River basin in the state of Mato Grosso do Sul.

== Description ==
Ancistrus formoso reaches a standard length of 7.9 cm (3.1 in). Ancistrus species develop soft, bushy tentacles on the snout when sexually mature, these are better developed in the males than they are in females. Alongside Ancistrus galani and A. cryptophthalmus, this species displays characteristics unusual among loricariids, such as reduced pigmentation and atrophied eyes, which are adaptations to a subterranean habitat that can be found in various types of cavefish.

== Distribution and habit ==
Ancistrus formoso is endemic to Brazil where it is known to occur only in flooded caves in the Formoso River system, the re-emergencies of the Formoso and Formosinho Rivers, and the Buraco do Ducho cave, a karst area of the Serra da Bodoquena in the upper Paraguay River basin, in Bonito and Jardim in Mato Grosso do Sul. This catfish is found in flooded caves, but it is not as photophobic as other cavefishes, but shows a strong prefernce for caves.

== Conservation status ==
Ancistrus formose is restricted to the Formoso River cave system which lies outside the boundaries of the Serra da Bodoquena National Parkin Mato Grosso do Sul. Limestone quarrying for cement manufacture is growing in the area, and this could impact this species in future.The cave system should be protected by expanding the National Park or by creating an adjacent conservation unit. The International Union for Conservation of Nature has classified this species as Vulnerable.
