= Serra Monte Cristo =

- Location within Brazil

Highest point
- Peak: Unnamed location
- Elevation: 1,118 m (3,668 ft)
- Coordinates: 16°04′00″S 59°28′00″W

Geography
- Country: Brazil
- Borders on: Serra Monte Cristo

Serra Monte Cristo is a Brazilian mountain range located within the state of Mato Grosso. The state's highest point is located there, measuring 1,118 meters (3,668 feet).

The range is protected by the 120,092 hectares (296,750 acres) Serra de Santa Bárbara State Park, created in 1997.
