= Barbado River =

- Location within Brazil
- Native name: Rio Barbado (Portuguese)

Location
- Country: Brazil

Physical characteristics
- Source
  - location: Mato Grosso state
- Mouth
  - coordinates: 15.220275°S 59.974675°W

Basin features
- River system: Guaporé River
- Tributaries
  - left: Gomalina River

The Barbado River is a river of Mato Grosso state in western Brazil. It is a tributary of the Alegre River, which in turn is a tributary of the Guaporé River. Swamps can be found between the river and the mouth of Guaporé River.

== See also ==
- List of rivers of Mato Grosso
