= Emas National Park =

UNESCO World Heritage Site
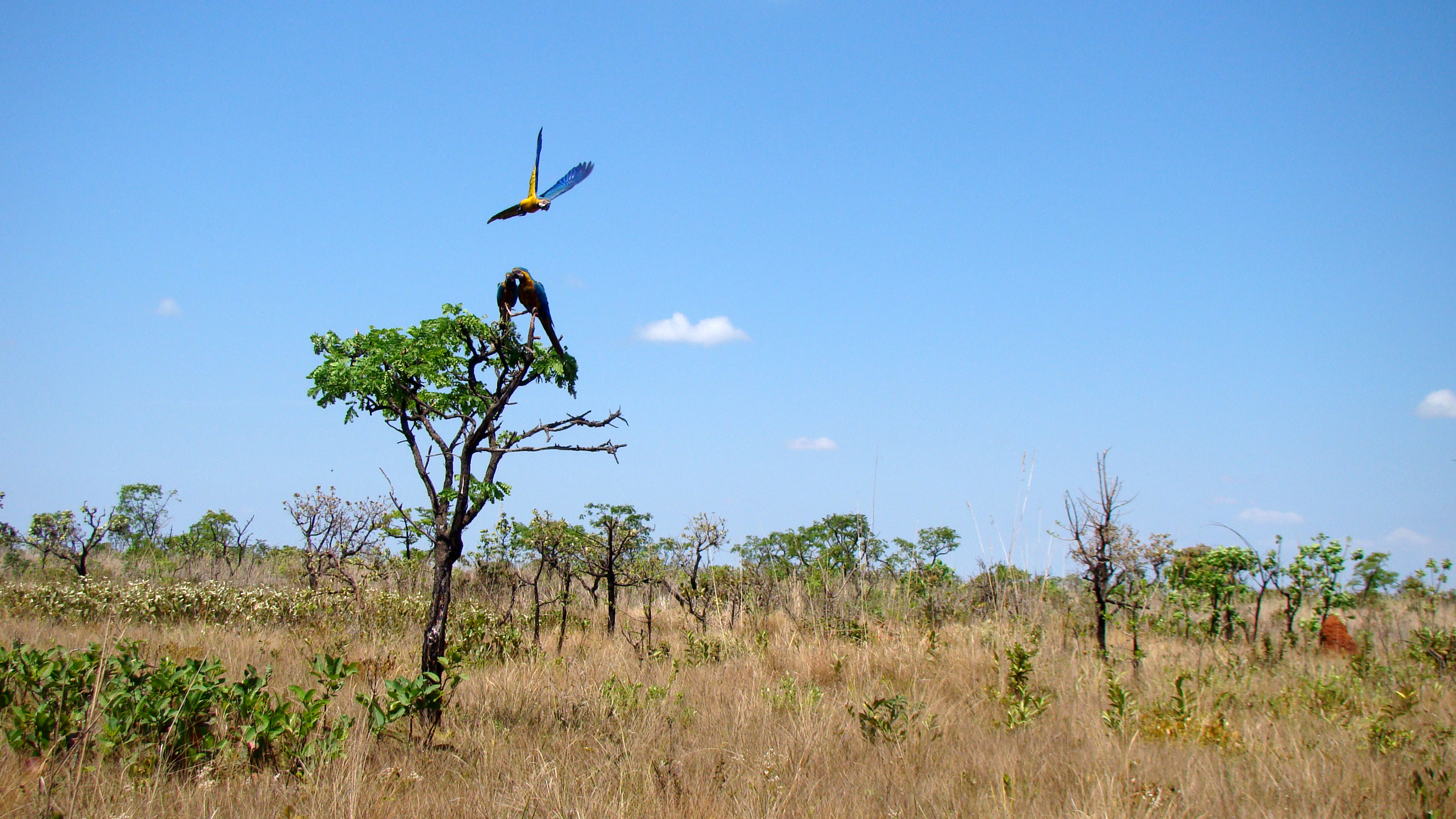

- Location within Brazil
- Location: Goiás, Brazil
- Part of: Cerrado Protected Areas: Chapada dos Veadeiros and Emas National Parks
- Criteria: Natural: (ix)(x)
- Reference: 1035-002
- Inscription: 2001 (25th Session)
- Area: 131,386 ha (324,660 acres)
- Coordinates: 18°S 53°W

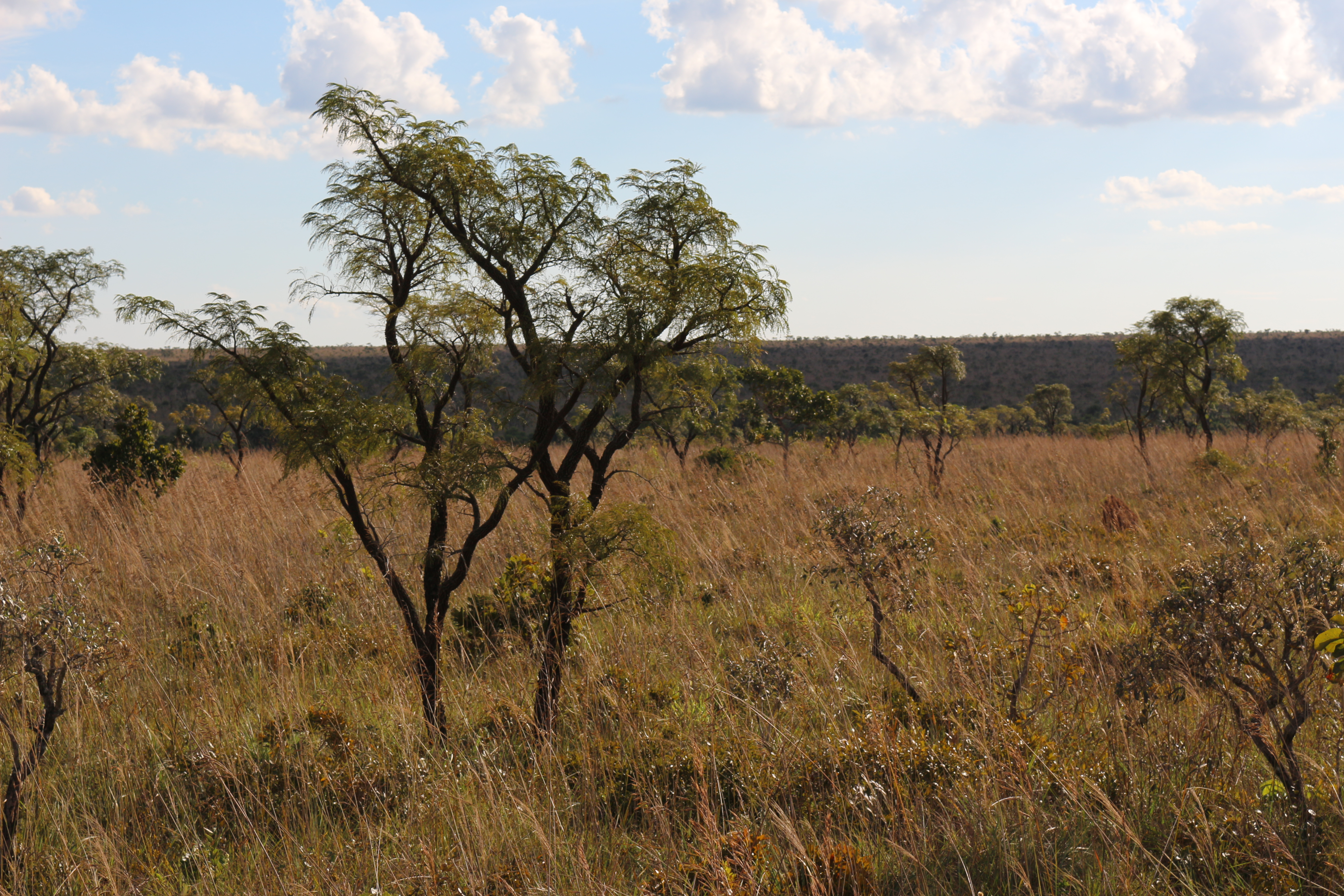

The Emas National Park (Portuguese: Parque Nacional das Emas, literally meaning "Rhea National Park") is a national park and a UNESCO World Heritage Site in the states of Goiás and Mato Grosso do Sul in Brazil.

== Description ==
The National Park is located between the states of Goiás and Mato Grosso do Sul in the Center-West Region of Brazil, between 17º50’—18º15’S and 52º39’—53º10’W. It covers 1,320 square kilometres (510 sq mi) of cerrado savannah. The park is in the Pantanal Biosphere Reserve, which also includes the Pantanal, Chapada dos Guimarães and Serra da Bodoquena national parks, and the Serra de Santa Bárbara, Nascentes do Rio Taquari and Pantanal de Rio Negro state parks. The surrounding area is dominated by large soybean plantations.

== Flora and fauna ==
Emas National Park shows a typical cerrado ecosystem; a treeless savannah with tall termite mounds and an interesting amount of wildlife: the giant anteater, the maned wolf, giant armadillo, pampas deer and the namesake greater rhea, among others.

Emas National Park also holds a small jaguar population, perhaps consisting of about 10-12 animals. Only about 40% of the reserve, which covers 1,320 square kilometres (510 sq mi) in total, is good jaguar habitat.

Other larger mammals include puma, ocelot, Brazilian tapir, collared peccary, white-lipped peccary, marsh deer, red brocket, gray brocket, black howler monkey and capybara.

== Sources ==
- Carrijo, Martha GilkaGutiérrez; Torrecilha, Sylvia (June 2009), Plano de Manejo do Parque Estadual das Nascentes do Taquari (PDF), Campo Grande – Mato Grosso do Sul: IMASUL: Instituto do Meio Ambiente de Mato Grosso do Sul, archived from the original (PDF) on 2016-12-20
