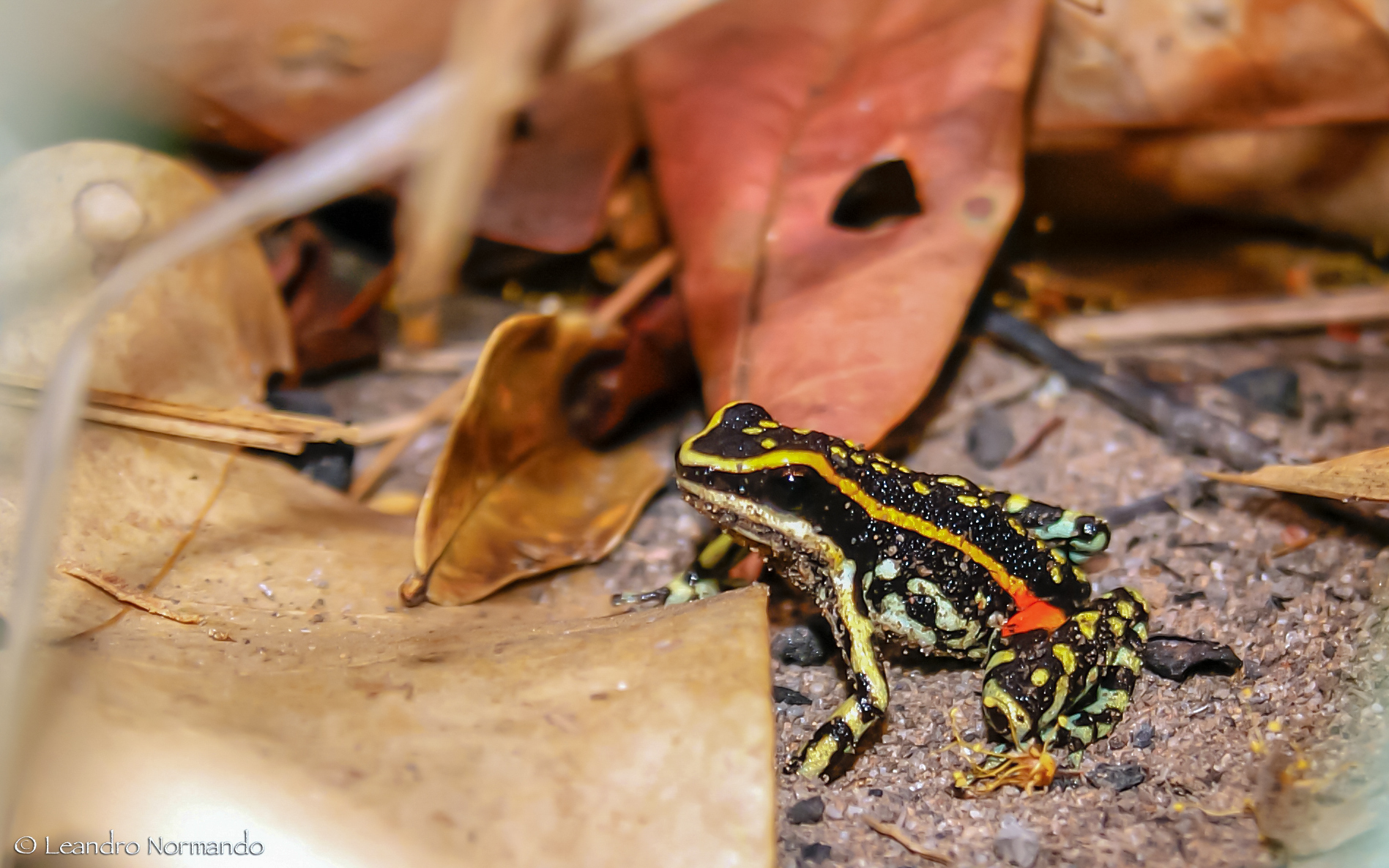

Conservation status
- Least Concern (IUCN 3.1)

Scientific classification
- Kingdom: Animalia
- Phylum: Chordata
- Class: Amphibia
- Order: Anura
- Family: Dendrobatidae
- Genus: Ameerega
- Species: A. flavopicta

Binomial name
- Ameerega flavopicta (A. Lutz, 1925)

Synonyms
- Epipedobates flavopictus

= Lutz's poison frog =

Species of amphibian

Lutz's poison frog (Ameerega flavopicta; formerly Epipedobates flavopicta) is a species of frog in the family Dendrobatidae found in Bolivia and Brazil.

== Habitat ==
Its natural habitats are subtropical or tropical moist lowland forests, subtropical or tropical moist montane forests, moist savanna, subtropical or tropical moist shrubland, rivers, intermittent freshwater marshes, and rocky areas. Reproduction occurs in rocky pools and streams. Eggs are laid on leaf litter and the adult transports tadpoles to wet trenches or small rocky pools.

The frog's known range includes many protected parks: Área de Preservação Ambiental da Nascente do Rio das Balsas, Área de Preservação Ambiental Lago de São Salvador do Tocantins, Paranana e Palmeirópolis, Área de Preservação Ambiental Morro da Pedreira, Área de Preservação Ambiental Pouso Alto, Área de Preservação Ambiental Serra da Jibóia, Área de Preservação Ambiental Serra do Cabral Augusto de Lima, Estação Ecológica de Pirapitinga, Floresta Nacional de Carajás, Parque Estadual Cristalino II, Parque Estadual da Serra de Caldas Novas, Parque Nacional da Chapada dos Veadeiros, Parque Nacional da Serra da Canastra, Parque Nacional da Serra do Cipo, Parque Nacional do Jamanxim, RPPN Fazenda Arruda, and RPPN Fazenda Pioneira.

== Breeding ==
Lutz's poison frog males call for females in breeding sites, such as rock crevices, termite nests, low vegetation or trenches. Breeding periods for this species were seen to begin with male calling during months of October to December, then sights of tadpoles were during November to April, and finally froglets were recorded during January to April.

== Threats ==
The IUCN classifies this frog as least concern of extinction. It does face some localized threat from habitat loss associated with farming, mining, logging, and livestock cultivation. While there is both breeding and wild capture for the international pet trade, scientists do not believe this poses a threat to the population.
