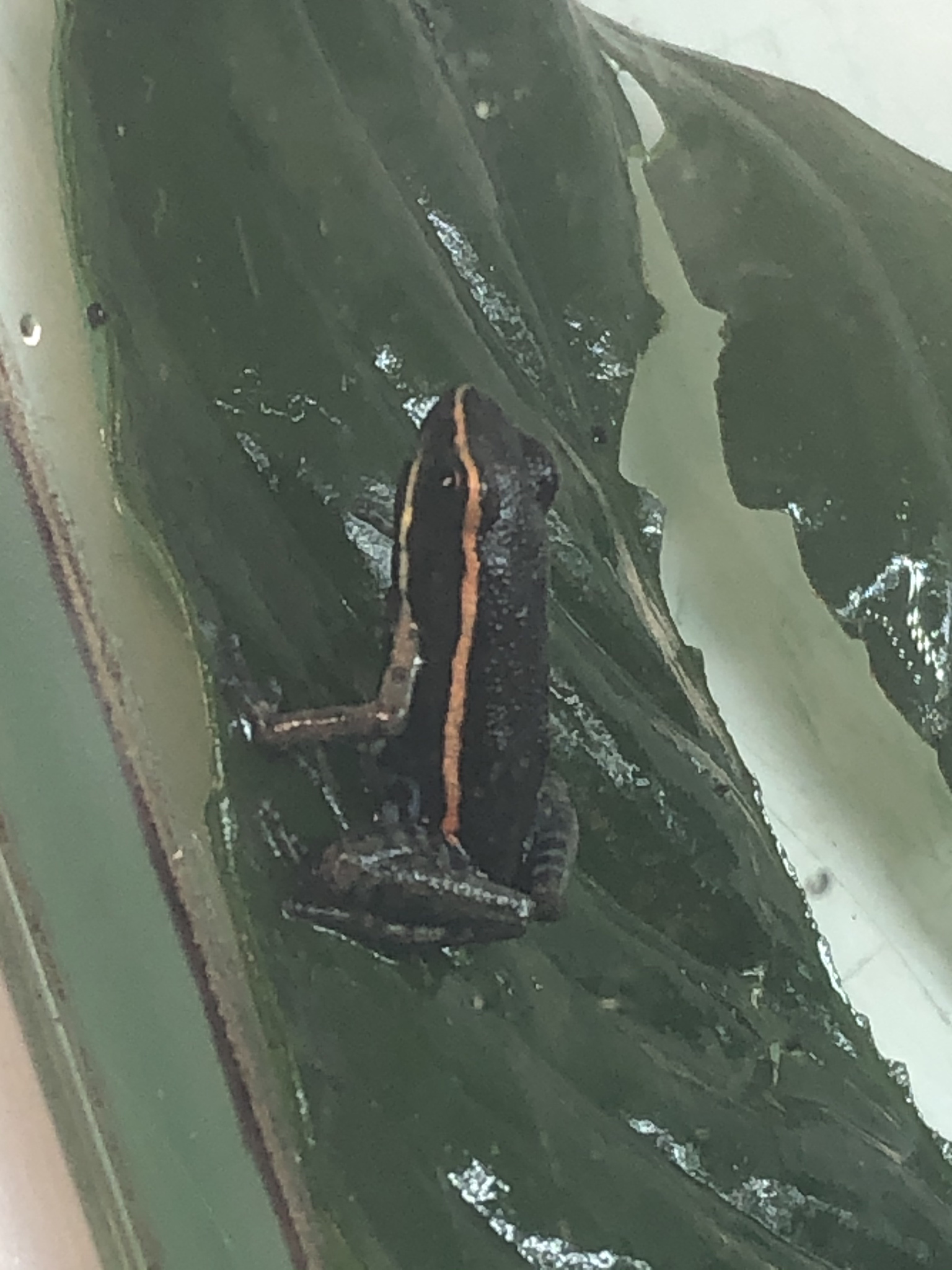
- Ameerega shihuemoy at the Manu Learning Centre

Conservation status
- Endangered (IUCN 3.1)

Scientific classification
- Kingdom: Animalia
- Phylum: Chordata
- Class: Amphibia
- Order: Anura
- Family: Dendrobatidae
- Genus: Ameerega
- Species: A. shihuemoy

Binomial name
- Ameerega shihuemoy Serrano-Rojas, Whitworth, Villacampa, Von May, Gutierrez, Padial & Chaparro, 2017

= Ameerega shihuemoy =

Amarakaeri poison frog

Species of frog

Ameerega shihuemoy, the Amarakaeri poison frog, is a species of dart frog endemic to a small region in southeastern Peru in the Manú District where it lives in the transition zone between montane rainforest and the lowland rainforest. The frog is a member of the Ameerega picta group. It was discovered at the Manú Learning Centre where it is known to occur in pieces of selectively logged forest. This species is threatened by habitat loss due to agriculture, gold mining, oil extraction, road construction, and logging. Currently the frog is only known from nine locations globally; three sites in the Manú Biosphere Reserve, and six in Amarakaeri Communal Reserve.

== Etymology ==
The word shihuemoy in the species' scientific name is the Harakmbut word for a poison dart frog. The Amarakaeri People who are an indigenous group in southeastern Peru are speakers of the Harakmbut linguistic group, and live within the known range of the frog species.

== Habitat and ecology ==
Ameerega shihuemoy is a terrestrial frog which primarily inhabits fast-flowing rocky streams, and low disturbance forested areas in the Andean foothills of the Manú District. The frogs have only been found within primary rainforest, and minimally disturbed regenerating rainforest, often near rocky fast-moving streams, at elevations of 340–850 meters (1,120–2,790 ft). In areas of low disturbance they can also be found near wetlands, and during the rainy season near small temporary pools of standing water. They are most active at dusk and dawn, being primarily crepuscular, during which times the males can be heard calling. Females deposit clutches of 20–25 eggs inside of rock shelters near permanent and seasonal streams. The males will then protect the clutches of eggs until they hatch, and then carry them to the stream. One such individual was observed at the Manú Learning Centre carrying a group of 10 tadpoles on its back along a stream. Reproduction is believed to take place during both the dry and rainy seasons, as mating calls can be heard throughout the year. During the dry season the frogs can typically be found around boulders near rocky streams. In the rainy season they move further into the rainforest interior. Males usually call from exposed positions on rocks, leaf litter, and woody debris. The frogs have been observed using small crevices under roots, logs, and boulders for refuge. At night the frogs have been witnessed resting on low growing vegetation.

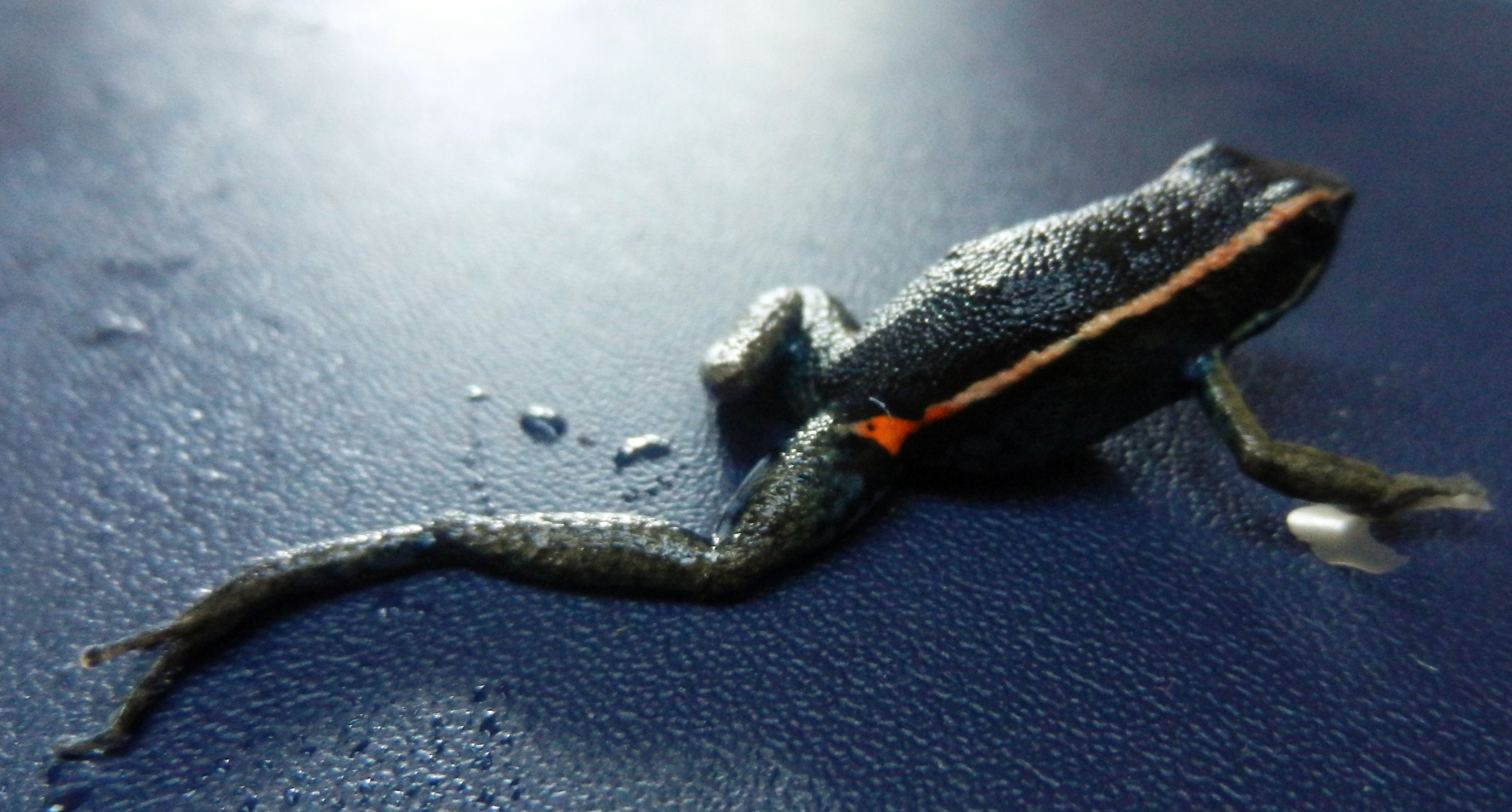
Ameerega shihuemoy showing thigh patterning

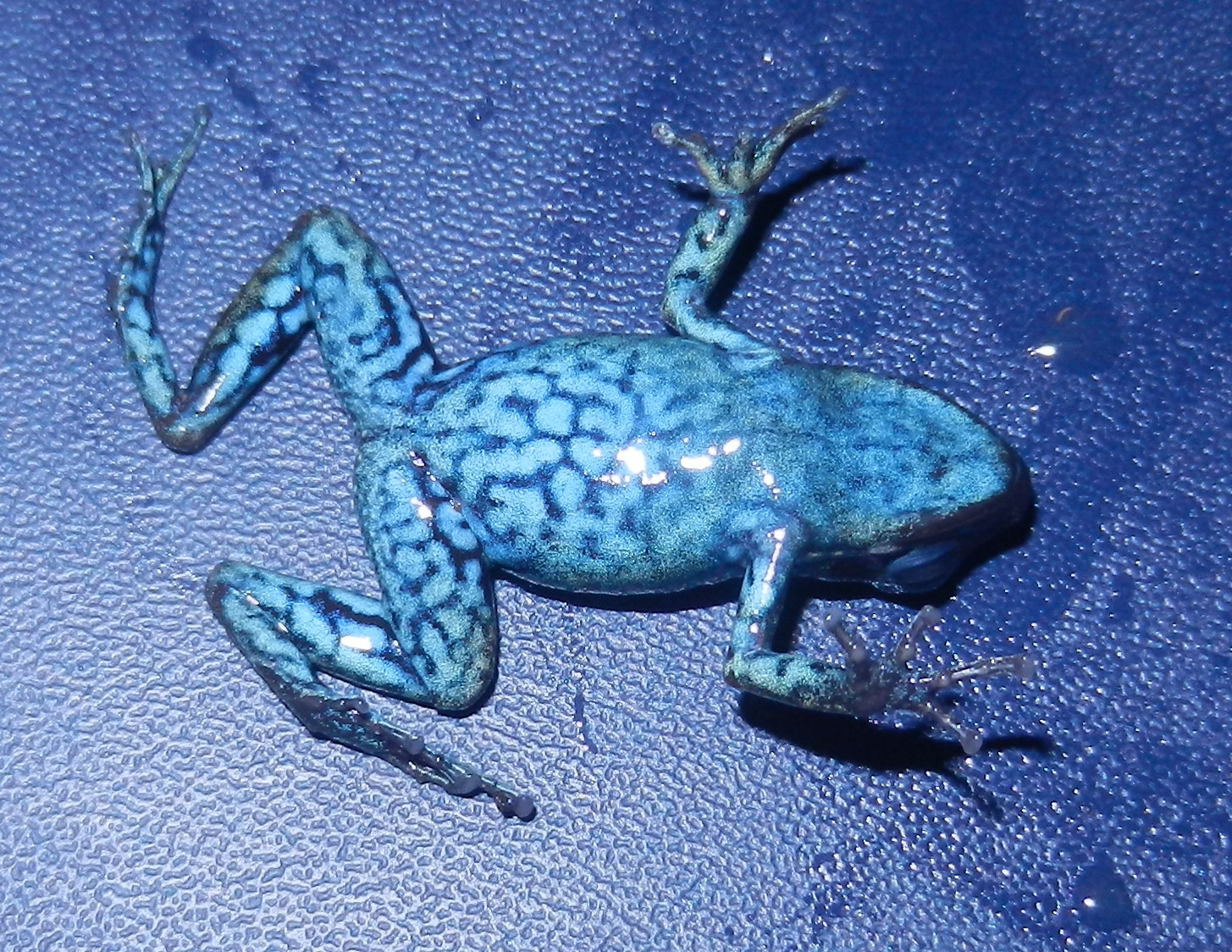
Ameerega shihuemoy showing ventral coloration

Tadpoles and metamorphs of this species have been found living alongside the tadpoles and metamorphs of Ameerega macero also known as the Manú poison frog. Both species tadpoles are found in streams with shallow, slow moving, clear water with a sediment of sand and dead leaves. As adults this species is known to coexist in the same habitats as several other Ameerega species. At the Manú Learning Centre it is known to share habitat with Ameerega macero, and Ameerega hahneli. It likely also occurs alongside Ameerega trivittata, and Ameerega simulans in parts of its range.

The frog is reported to have a distinct call from the other Ameerega species found in the area. This species mating call can be characterized as a series of chirp-like, pulsed notes. These notes are repeated at a rate of around 0.8–1.0 notes per second, and the duration of individual notes can range from around 84–109 ms, spaced around 969–1,196 ms apart, typically with around eight pulses per note. Their dominant call frequency ranges from around 4,478.9–4,909.6 Hz. Calling typically occurs most prominently during the early morning between 5:00-9:00 AM and late afternoon and dusk between 4:00-6:00 PM.

Additionally a second call has been reported in A. shihuemoy which consists of three notes in quick succession (within around 174.9 ms of each other), repeated once every 4–5 seconds. Each of the three notes in the second call have different durations; the first note (~87.2 ms) is usually longer than the second note (~69.4 ms) and the third note (~72.8 ms). The secondary call seems to function as some form of territorial call to challenge or deter other individual frogs. Call ecology has been reported from three individual frogs at the Manu Learning Centre.

== Description ==
The Amarakaeri poison frog is a medium-sized dart frog with a black unmarked dorsum, and an orange dorsolateral stripe running from the tip of the snout to the groin where it turns into a bright orange blotch that extends slightly to the anterior surface of the thigh. Under the eye the frog has a whitish-bronze labial stripe which extends under the tympanum to the base of the upper arm. The legs are brown with faint dark mottling. All ventral surfaces are a bright blue against a bold black reticulated pattern. The blue pattern fades to a pale grey or bronze color on the lateral sides of the frog before fading away entirely. Their iris is black with copper flecks. The eggs are covered in a transparent orange mucilage.

They range between around 19.2–25.7 mm (0.76–1.01 in) long in snout vent length. The males are smaller on average being measured between 19.2–21.8 mm (0.76–0.86 in) in length compared to the females measured 21.5–25.7 mm (0.85–1.01 in).

== Threats ==
Initially it was considered for a status of vulnerable or near-threatened, but due to its low number of known localities, the IUCN considers it endangered. Principal threats include habitat loss associated with subsistence farming, road construction, illegal logging, and both legal and illegal mining.

== Similar species ==
Several Ameerega species closely resemble Ameerega shihuemoy but can be easily distinguished through different coloration. Ameerega hahneli and Ameerega picta are the most similar species, but can be distinguished by being smaller, having white dorsolateral stripes, and yellow blotches on the shanks. Another similar species is Ameerega boliviana which can be distinguished by having a yellow dorsolateral stripe, white ventrolateral stripe, and a cream colored ventral side with black marbling. Ameerega yungicola has also been noted as similar, but has a white ventrolateral stripe, and a non-marbled throat.
