= Ameerega ignipedis =

Conservation status
- Least Concern (IUCN 3.1)

Scientific classification
- Kingdom: Animalia
- Phylum: Chordata
- Class: Amphibia
- Order: Anura
- Family: Dendrobatidae
- Genus: Ameerega
- Species: A. ignipedis

Binomial name
- Ameerega ignipedis Brown & Twomey, 2009

Species of amphibian

Ameerega ignipedis is a species of poison frog found in central Peru. It is similar to Ameerega petersi, but differs from the latter in call and size, by having allopatric distributions, and by not being close relatives (Bayesian phylogeny). It is also similar in appearance to A. pongoensis, although the latter doesn't possess flash marks above its groin and has a different call. It is also related to A. bassleri, a much larger species which usually possesses a yellow or orange dorsum.

== Description ==
The adult frog measures 20.3 to 24.2 mm in snout-vent length. The skin of the dorsum is brown near the spine and patterned black nearer to the sides until it is all black on the flanks. There are yellow stripes from the nares over the eyelids down to the groin. There are also yellow labial stripes from the mouth to the axilla. The legs have brown, black, blue, and yellow coloration. The iris of the eye is black in color.

== Habitat and range ==
Scientists first described this frog from two type localities in Serranía de Contamana, but they believe it ranges beyond the area. It lives in forests near streams, especially geothermal streams. While it is more common near streams where the water is 90 °C or hotter, it can also live in colder streams. Scientists saw the frog between 220 and 331 meters above sea level.

The frog's range includes the buffer zone of one protected park, Sierra del Divisor National Park. This has been a protected area since 2015.

== Reproduction ==
Scientists have observed the male frog carrying tadpoles on his back. They infer that, like other male frogs in Ameerega, he is carrying his newly hatched offspring to water for further development.

== Threats ==
The IUCN classifies this frog as least concern of extinction. What threat it faces coming from ongoing mining and oil extraction in the Sierra del Divisor, a planned roadway, and logging and agriculture.
