= Ameerega pepperi =

Conservation status
- Vulnerable (IUCN 3.1)

Scientific classification
- Kingdom: Animalia
- Phylum: Chordata
- Class: Amphibia
- Order: Anura
- Family: Dendrobatidae
- Genus: Ameerega
- Species: A. pepperi

Binomial name
- Ameerega pepperi Brown and Twomey, 2009

Species of amphibian

Ameerega pepperi is a species of poison frogs found in central Peru. It is similar morphologically to A. bassleri, A. cainarachi and A. yoshina; but can be distinguished by its advertisement call.

== Description ==
Two adult male specimens were both 28.6 mm long in snout-vent length and the female frogs were 30.8–34.4 mm long. The skin of the dorsum back is black with red, orange, or yellow patterning. There is more color near the head and less near the vent. There are two yellow stripes from each eye down the body. There are two yellow labial stripes starting at the nares. The ventrum is dark blue with black patterning. The legs are black or dark green in color. There are stripes on the back legs. The iris of the eye is black in color. These frogs can differ in color geographically. Frogs from further south have more red on their backs and frogs from further north have more yellow and orange on their backs.

== Etymology ==
Scientists named this frog for Canadian conservationist Mark Pepper.

== Habitat ==
This frog lives in undisturbed primary and secondary forest. The adult frogs have been found hiding next to boulders near streams. Scientists observed the frog between 380 and 1000 meters above sea level.

The frog's known range includes at least one protected park, Parque Nacional Cordillera Azul.

== Reproduction ==
The male frogs perch on boulders near streams and call to the female frogs. The female frog lays eggs on the leaf litter. She lays 22–44 eggs per clutch. The male frog guards the eggs. Tadpoles have been observed in slow eddies and in pools next to streams, presumably left there after the water level declined.

The tadpoles can grow into frogs in as short a time as five weeks.

== Threats ==
The IUCN classifies this frog as vulnerable to extinction. In parts of its range, it is at risk due to habitat loss, especially in Huallaga. People alter habitat in favor of farms for both legal and illegal crops, for example coffee, bananas, and coca.

People do keep this frog as a pet, but scientists say this is not a danger to wild frogs. The law permits captive breeding.
