= Ameerega yoshina =

Conservation status
- Endangered (IUCN 3.1)

Scientific classification
- Kingdom: Animalia
- Phylum: Chordata
- Class: Amphibia
- Order: Anura
- Family: Dendrobatidae
- Genus: Ameerega
- Species: A. yoshina

Binomial name
- Ameerega yoshina Brown and Twomey, 2009

Species of amphibian

Ameerega yoshina is a species of poison frogs found in central Peru.

== Habitat ==
It was found in the Huallaga Province. The frog has been found in two places, one in Serranía de Contamana and the other in Cordillera Azul. It seems to have specific habitat needs: It lives in undisturbed premontane forests and has only been found near streams. The adult frogs have been under logs and under piles of leaf litter. Scientists saw the frog between 230 and 600 meters above sea level.

The frog's known range includes Cordillera Azul National Park, and it has been found in the buffer zone of Sierra del Divisor National Park.

== Description ==
This frog resembles A. bassleri and A. pepperi, but can be differentiated by its advertisement call being slower than its relatives; approximately one-half the speed of A. bassleri and one-quarter the speed of A. pepperi. The adult frog measures 26–35 mm in snout-vent length. This frog has small forefeet for a frog its side. There are yellow stripes from the eyes to the vent. Other than that, these frogs differ in color geographically. Frogs that live near Contamana have brick-red or orange backs and green-gold or yellow-green bellies. Frogs from Callanayacu can have orange or red backs but are usually orange and they have blue bellies with black marks on them. In both groups of frogs, the legs can be black, light olive green, or any color in between.

== Etymology ==
Scientists named this frog yoshina for the Panoan word yoshin, which means "evil spirit," a reference to the difficulty of finding the frog and to its haunting voice.

== Reproduction ==
The male frog sits on the dead leaves on the ground and calls to the female frogs. The tadpoles have been observed in shallow forest pools.

== Threats ==
The IUCN classifies this frog as endangered. The principal threat is habitat loss, especially near Río Huallaga. The habitats the frog favors are converted to farms, particularly for palm oil, coffee, and bananas. In Seirra del Divisor, the principal threats are road and pipeline construction building, mining, and oil drilling. There is also some threat from illegal logging.
