= Rhadinoloricaria macromystax =

Conservation status
- Data Deficient (IUCN 3.1)

Scientific classification
- Kingdom: Animalia
- Phylum: Chordata
- Class: Actinopterygii
- Order: Siluriformes
- Family: Loricariidae
- Genus: Rhadinoloricaria
- Species: R. macromystax

Binomial name
- Rhadinoloricaria macromystax (Günther, 1869)

Synonyms
- Loricaria macromystax Günther, 1869

Species of fish

Rhadinoloricaria macromystax is a species of freshwater ray-finned fish belonging to the family Loricariidae, the suckermouth armored catfishes, and the subfamily Loricariinae, the mailed catfishes. The genus was monotypic until 2020, when a new species, R. stewarti, was described.

Rhadinoloricaria macromystax is endemic to Peru where it occurs in the upper Amazon. It is known to occur over sandy substrates. The species reaches a standard length of 14.2 cm (5.6 in). This detrivorous, benthic species lives in white and clear water rivers with soft substrates made up of sand or lime.
