= Spot-legged frog =

Spot-legged frog may refer to:

- Spot-legged poison frog (Ameerega picta), a frog in the family Dendrobatidae found in Bolivia, Brazil, Peru, and Venezuela
- Spot-legged tree frog (Polypedates megacephalus), a frog in the family Rhacophoridae found in China and Taiwan
