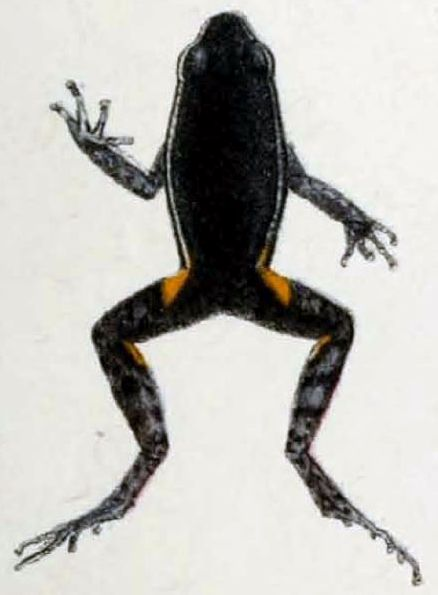

Conservation status
- Least Concern (IUCN 3.1)

Scientific classification
- Kingdom: Animalia
- Phylum: Chordata
- Class: Amphibia
- Order: Anura
- Family: Dendrobatidae
- Genus: Ameerega
- Species: A. hahneli

Binomial name
- Ameerega hahneli (Boulenger, 1884)

Synonyms
- Dendrobates hahneli Boulenger, 1884 "1883"; Epipedobates hahneli (Boulenger, 1884)

= Ameerega hahneli =

Species of frog

Ameerega hahneli is a species of frog in the family Dendrobatidae. It is found in the Amazonian lowlands of Brazil, Bolivia, Peru, Ecuador, Colombia, Venezuela, Guyana, French Guiana, and Suriname. It is named after Paul Hahnel, the collector of the type series.

== Taxonomy ==
Ameerega hahneli has been mixed with Ameerega picta, and also considered its synonym. It may represent several species; Ameerega altamazonica has already been split off from the former Ameerega hahneli.

== Description ==
Males measure 17–19 mm (0.67–0.75 in) and females 19–22 mm (0.75–0.87 in) in snout–vent length. The back and limbs are finely granular and brown in colour, with or without black spots. The flanks are black and bordered above by a narrow, white or cream colored dorsolateral line that extends from the tip of the snout to the groin. There is also a white or cream coloured labial stripe that does not extend onto the arm. The venter is blue with black reticulations. There are yellow-orange oval spots on the ventral surfaces of the arms, inner surfaces of the shanks, and in the groin. The iris is dark brown.

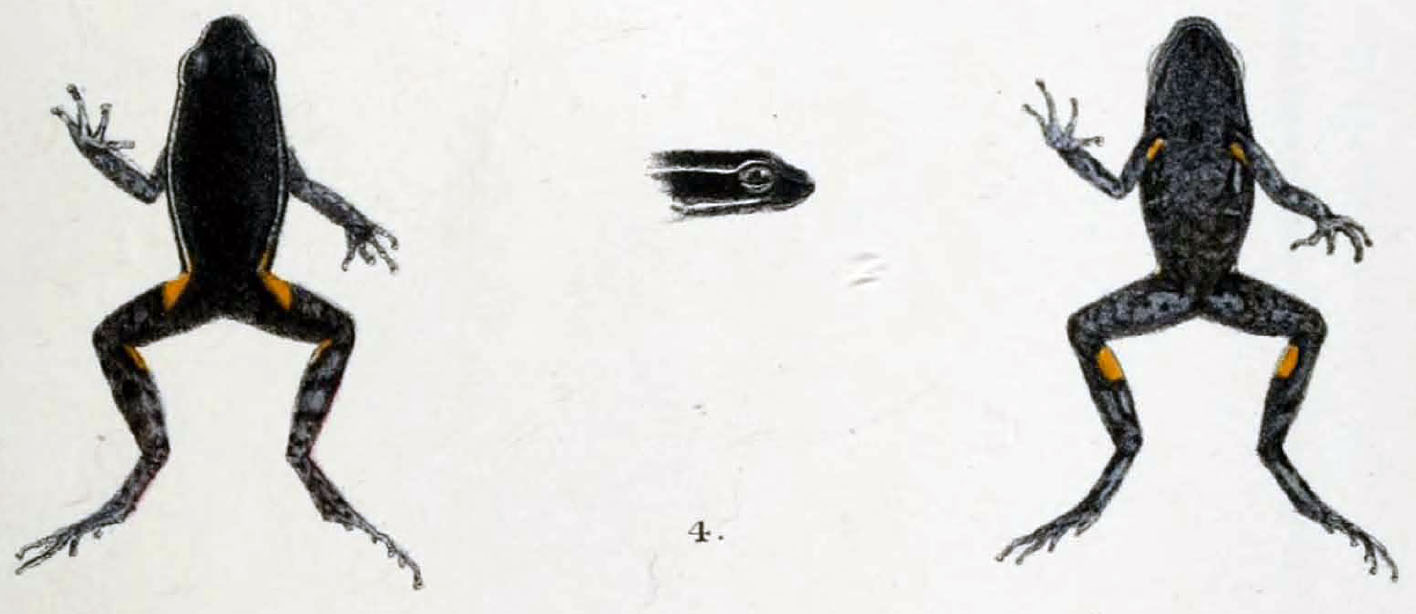
Original illustration of the holotype (dorsal view, head, and ventral view).

== Reproduction ==
Males are territorial. The territorial call is a long series of short "peep" notes, whereas the courtship call is similar but consists of only three notes. Females lay 6–33 pigmented eggs on the leaf-litter. Eggs hatch after 4–16 days and are carried on the back of their father to a creek. The tadpoles require running water. Tadpoles are brown, with a depressed body, and long tail. They metamorphose after two months.

== Habitat and conservation ==
Ameerega hahneli is a common frog, apart from the Guianas where it is uncommon. It occurs on the forest floor in the tropical rainforest. It is usually associated with fallen palm fronds, branches, and small gaps in the forest. They are active during the day and hide in low vegetation at night.

It can be threatened by habitat loss, but the total population is stable and the species is not threatened. There is legal captive breeding for the international pet trade, but scientists do not consider this a threat.
