= Ameerega rubriventris =

Conservation status
- Endangered (IUCN 3.1)

Scientific classification
- Kingdom: Animalia
- Phylum: Chordata
- Class: Amphibia
- Order: Anura
- Family: Dendrobatidae
- Genus: Ameerega
- Species: A. rubriventris

Binomial name
- Ameerega rubriventris (Lötters, Debold, Henle, Glaw, and Kneller, 1997)

Synonyms
- Epipedobates rubriventris Lötters, Debold, Henle, Glaw, and Kneller, 1997; Epipedobates hahneli rubriventris Schulte, 1999; Ameerega rubiventris Frost, Grant, Faivovich, Bain, Haas, Haddad, de Sá, Channing, Wilkinson, Donnellan, Raxworthy, Campbell, Blotto, Moler, Drewes, Nussbaum, Lynch, Green, and Wheeler, 2006

Species of frog

Ameerega rubriventris is a small species of poison dart frog. It is found in secondary wet forests of Peru at an elevation of 350–1000 m.

== Description ==
Ameerega rubriventris exhibits a dark black-brown coloration on its upper body, which may be adorned with marbled patterns in certain specimens, featuring cream or copper-colored stripes along the sides of its back. Additionally, it possesses a complete or fragmented cream or rosé-colored stripe on its lips. The dorsal region of the frog appears granular, as does the surface of its hind limbs, while the anterior limbs display slight granulation. Yellow spots can be observed above the armpits, groin, and calves, with the belly exhibiting a reticulated pattern in shades of red-black or orange-black. The limbs range in color from gray to brown, with some individuals displaying black reticulation. When the frog's fingers are pressed together, the first finger appears longer than the second. The palms and soles of Ameerega rubriventris are black-brown in color, and webbing is either absent or only rudimentary. Notably, this species lacks teeth.

The only sign of sexual dimorphism is that males are slightly smaller than females. Adult Ameerega rubriventris measures around 21.1–24.5 mm.

== Habitat ==
This frog lives in the Cordillera Azul mountains. It dwells on the leaf litter in dense primary and secondary forest. Scientists saw the frog between 300 and 550 meters above sea level.

The frog's known range includes a protected park: Parque Nacional Cordillera Azul.

== Reproduction ==
The female frog lays eggs on the ground. After the eggs hatch, the male frog carries the tadpoles to water.

== Threats ==
The IUCN classifies this frog as endangered. It enjoys legal protection from the government of Peru. The principal threat is habitat loss associated with logging, subsistence farming (both crops and cattle) and ornamental tree farming. This frog is also sold illegally on the international pet trade, but scientists do not classify this as a major threat.
