= Ameerega imasmari =

Conservation status
- Least Concern (IUCN 3.1)

Scientific classification
- Kingdom: Animalia
- Phylum: Chordata
- Class: Amphibia
- Order: Anura
- Family: Dendrobatidae
- Genus: Ameerega
- Species: A. imasmari

Binomial name
- Ameerega imasmari Brown et al., 2019

Species of frog

Ameerega imasmari, commonly known as riddle poison frog, is a species of poison dart frog that lives in Peru and was described in 2019. The specific epithet imasmari means "riddle" in the indigenous Quechua language.

== Description ==
Ameerega imasmari is a small species of Ameerega, adult males are slightly smaller than females (sexual dimorphism): males' size ranges from 18.3 to 19.0 mm and females' size ranges from 19.8 to 21.8 mm.

== Habitat ==
Ameerega imasmari is found in southern Peru (Cuzco, Junín and Pasco) at elevations of 200–400 m, especially purma forest.

The frog's range includes many protected areas.

== Reproduction ==
After the eggs hatch, the adult frogs carry the tadpoles to water.

== Threats ==
The IUCN classifies this frog as not at least concern of extinction. What danger it faces takes the form of habitat loss from fires and subsistence farming and logging.
