= Silverstone's poison frog =

Conservation status
- Endangered (IUCN 3.1)

Scientific classification
- Kingdom: Animalia
- Phylum: Chordata
- Class: Amphibia
- Order: Anura
- Family: Dendrobatidae
- Genus: Ameerega
- Species: A. silverstonei

Binomial name
- Ameerega silverstonei (Myers & Daly, 1979)

Synonyms
- Epipedobates silverstonei (Myers & Daly, 1979)

Species of amphibian

Silverstone's poison frog (Ameerega silverstonei; formerly Epipedobates silverstonei) is a species of frog in the family Dendrobatidae endemic to Peru. Its natural habitats are subtropical or tropical moist lowland forests and rivers.

== Description ==
Silverstone's poison frog is a large Dendrobatid frog with males growing to a snout–vent length of about 38 mm (1.5 in) and females to 43 mm (1.7 in). The head has a rounded sloping snout and is as wide as the body. Males have a small vocal sac in the throat. The skin of the head, fore limbs and underparts is smooth while that of the dorsal surface and hind limbs is granular. The fingers are flattened and have expanded discs at their tips. There is no webbing between the digits of either hands or feet. The head and back of this frog is orange-red, sometimes with black spots or mottling, especially towards the rear. The hind limbs are largely black and the forelimbs and underparts vary in colour, sometimes being black and sometimes orange. The palms of the hands and feet and the underside of the digits are grey or orange.

The tadpoles begin gray or brown-black in color and slowly gain some yellow pigmentation in some areas as they age, for example over the eyelids and on the growing forelimbs. Their brown areas slowly turn black and their yellow areas turn light orange or red as they grow into froglets. The young frogs develop full adult colors around the time they are 12 months old.

== Distribution ==
Silverstone's poison frog is endemic to Peru. It is found in Cordillera Azul mountain range in Huánuco Department, where it is found at an altitude of about 1,330 m (4,364 ft) above sea level. Its range is not precisely known and might be wider than is thought. It has also been introduced to the vicinity of Tarapoto in the San Martín Region but the result of this introduction is unknown.

The frog's known range includes one protected area: Parque Nacional Cordillera Azul.

== Biology ==
Silverstone's poison frog is a terrestrial species that is found among the leaf litter of the forest floor in tropical montane forests. Males are territorial during the breeding season and call to attract females. The eggs are laid in small clutches of about thirty eggs in a closely packed single layer underneath leaves. The male guards them till they hatch. He then carries them on his back to a suitable ephemeral pool or water-filled crevice where the tadpoles develop until undergoing metamorphosis. The bright colors of this frog probably deter potential predators and this frog is known to be distasteful to snakes.

== Poison ==
This frog secretes toxins through its skin, specifically pumiliotoxin-A alkaloids. It lacks the more potent batrachotoxin alkaloids that have been observed in other poison dart frogs. Scientists observed a frog-eating snake capture an A. silverstonei frog, but the snake let the frog go immediately. The snake then appeared disoriented and tried to rub its mouth on branches. The snake did not die. Scientists think this means that the frog had enough poison to deter predators.

== Threats ==
The IUCN classifies this frog as endangered. One threat is habitat loss. Human beings convert forest to cattle grazing space, legal farms (such as tea plantations), and illegal cropland. The past fifteen years have seen losses from the international pet trade, despite laws protecting the frog from capture and sale. Scientists believe that most captured frogs die before reaching their new homes. Scientists also say that climate change could affect this frog.
