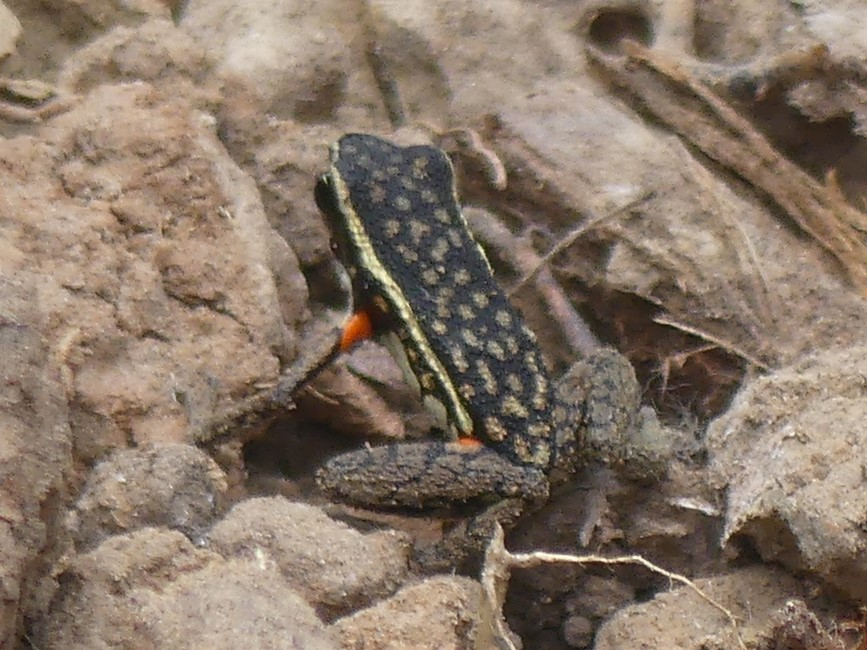

Conservation status
- Least Concern (IUCN 3.1)

Scientific classification
- Kingdom: Animalia
- Phylum: Chordata
- Class: Amphibia
- Order: Anura
- Family: Dendrobatidae
- Genus: Ameerega
- Species: A. panguana

Binomial name
- Ameerega panguana Brown, Siu-Ting, von May, Twomey, Guillory, Deutsch, and Chávez, 2019

= Ameerega panguana =

Species of frog

Ameerega panguana is a species of poison dart frog found in Peru that was first described in 2019.

== Description ==
Ameerega panguana is a small species of Ameerega, adult males are slightly smaller than females (the only sign of sexual dimorphism): males' size ranges from 16.9 to 19.7 mm and females' size ranges from 16.6 to 22.1 mm.

== Habitat ==
Ameerega panguana is found at elevations of 200–400m in Huánaco, Peru in small streams in disturbed forested habitats, especially purma forest.

The frog's known range includes four protected areas: San Matías–San Carlos Protection Forest, El Sira Communal Reserve, Yánesha Communal Reservation, and a private concession called ACP Panguana.

== Reproduction ==
The males frog perches on leaves and calls to the female frogs. After the eggs hatch, the adult frogs carry the tadpoles to terrestrial pools of water.

== Threats ==
The IUCN classifies this frog as least concern of extinction. It suffers from habitat loss in parts of its range from fires, conversion of forest to cattle grazing area, conversion of forest to farms for subsistence agriculture, and logging.
