= Ameerega ingeri =

Conservation status
- Data Deficient (IUCN 3.1)

Scientific classification
- Kingdom: Animalia
- Phylum: Chordata
- Class: Amphibia
- Order: Anura
- Family: Dendrobatidae
- Genus: Ameerega
- Species: A. ingeri

Binomial name
- Ameerega ingeri (Cochran & Goin, 1970)

Synonyms
- Dendrobates ingeri Cochran & Goin, 1970; Phyllobates ingeri (Cochran & Goin, 1970); Epipedobates ingeri (Cochran & Goin, 1970)

Species of frog

Ameerega ingeri, also known commonly as Niceforo's poison frog, Brother Niceforo's poison frog, or Inger's poison frog, is a species of frog in the family Dendrobatidae. The species is endemic to the Colombian Amazon. It is known with certainty only from its type locality in the Caquetá Department. Records from the Putumayo Department ascribed to this species likely refer to Ameerega bilinguis, although other sources continue to include Putumayo in the range of Ameerega ingeri.

== Etymology ==
The specific name ingeri honors Robert F. Inger, an American zoologist from the Field Museum of Natural History. "Niceforo" in the common name refers to Brother Nicéforo María, a missionary and naturalist in Colombia, who collected the type series.

== Description ==
The type series of A. ingeri consists of four specimens, the largest of which (the holotype) measures 27.5 mm (1.1 in) in snout-to-vent length (SVL). The body is elongate. The eyes are large and prominent. The tympanum is small but distinct. The fingers are long and have relatively small discs and slight lateral fringes; no webbing is present. The toes are long and have slight basal webbing. The skin is dorsally coarsely granular. The dorsum in preserved specimens is slate black, but the top of head is little lighter, and there are traces of a gray chevron mark in front of the eyes. The venter is slate black, with slight indications of a coarse, light reticulation on the belly.

== Habitat and conservation ==
Ameerega ingeri occurs in tropical rainforest at 200 m (660 ft) above sea level, or if more broadly defined, at 100–400 m (330–1,310 ft). It is threatened by habitat loss—the area of the type locality is already deforested.
