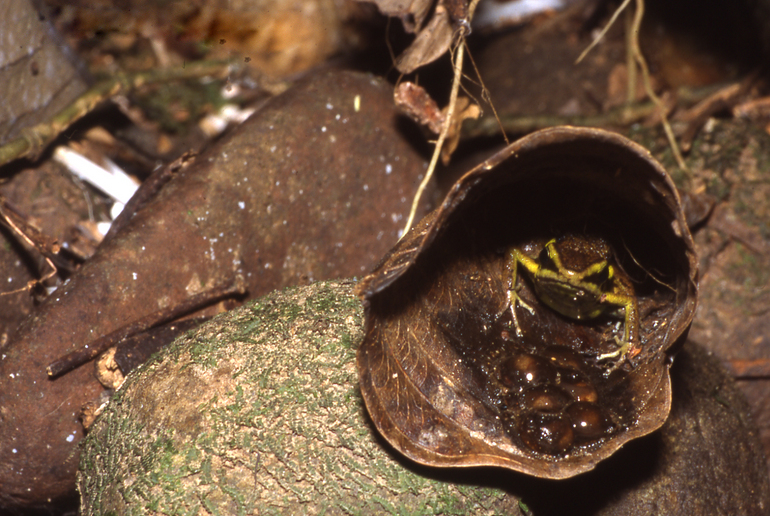

Conservation status
- Least Concern (IUCN 3.1)

Scientific classification
- Kingdom: Animalia
- Phylum: Chordata
- Class: Amphibia
- Order: Anura
- Family: Dendrobatidae
- Genus: Ameerega
- Species: A. petersi

Binomial name
- Ameerega petersi (Silverstone, 1976)

Synonyms
- Epipedobates macero Rodríguez & Myers, 1993; Ameerega smaragdinus (Silverstone, 1976)

= Peru poison frog =

Species of amphibian

The Peru poison frog (Ameerega petersi), also known as Peruvian poison frog, Peruvian poison-arrow frog and emerald poison frog, is a species of frog in the family Dendrobatidae.

== Habitat ==
It is found in eastern Peru (Ucayali River and Huallaga River basins) and western Brazil (Acre state). Its natural habitats are primary premontane and subtropical or tropical forests, but not in disturbed habitats. It has been observed between 274 and 800 meters above sea level in other places

The frog's known range includes several protected parks: Yanachaga-Chemillén National Park, and Parque Nacional Cordillera Azul, Parque Nacional da Serra do Divisor, and Reserva Extrativista do Alto Juruá. It is suspected in San Matias-San Carlos Protected Forest.

== Reproduction ==
The female frog lays her eggs on the leaf litter. After the eggs hatch, the adult frogs carry the tadpoles to water.

== Threats ==
The IUCN classifies this frog as least concern of extinction. It is subject to some habitat loss in favor of agriculture.

== Academic description ==
- "Ameerega smaragdina is synonymized with A. petersi after French et al 2019". Molec. Phylog. Evol. doi:10.1016/j.ympev.2019.05.021.
