= Manu Learning Centre =

Biological research institute in Peru

Fundo Mascoitania Reserve
- Interactive map of Fundo Mascoitania Reserve
- Location: Manú Province, Madre de Dios Region, Peru
- Nearest city: Cusco
- Coordinates: 12°47′22″S 71°23′32″W
- Area: 643 ha
- Established: September 26, 2002

The Manú Learning Centre (MLC) is located within the Fundo Mascoitania Reserve, a 643 hectare private nature reserve, encompassed within the cultural zone of the Manú Biosphere Reserve, a UNESCO World Heritage site and one of the largest protected areas in Peru. It is home to a variety of rainforest types including lowland Andean, pre-montane, bamboo and high terrace forests. This geographical complexity creates habitats for a diversity of flora and fauna. The MLC is operated by the CREES group, a non-profit and business collaboration working towards sustainability for the Manú Region. The MLC serves local schools and communities as well as international researchers and volunteers. It has hosted workshops for the Organization for Tropical Studies, and on behalf of the Manú National Park Guards, as well as research projects from the University of Oxford, Aberdeen, and Glasgow University in addition to the SOAS. The MLC has also worked alongside schools from the UK including Southbank International School and Tonbridge School.

== History ==
The MLC was built in 2004 on an abandoned hacienda, the first to be developed in the region. The initial concept was to demonstrate that it was possible to use novel land use techniques to rehabilitate large areas of degraded land and to empower and educate local communities throughout this process. There is a large body of work that had been completed at the MLC incorporating aspects of biology, geography, zoology, anthropology, tropical agriculture, politics, and art. Specific projects have focused on reforestation, mammal behaviour patterns, human impact studies, environmental management, monitoring of the blue headed macaw (CITES Red listed), soil & agricultural sustainability, forest dynamics, carbon offsetting, and the legitimacy of local power structures to name a handful.

In 2017 a new species of frog, Ameerega shihuemoy was described from the research station, where it was found occurring in SLR (selectively logged rainforest) habitat at the back of the reserve.

== CREES ==
CREES (Conservation, Research & Education towards Environmental Sustainability) was established in 2003 prior to the construction of the MLC and the creation of Fundo Mascoitania. It is the only organisation to be in operation within the Manú region of Peru who regularly consults with local populations about their development priorities and leads the consequential local development projects.

== Access ==
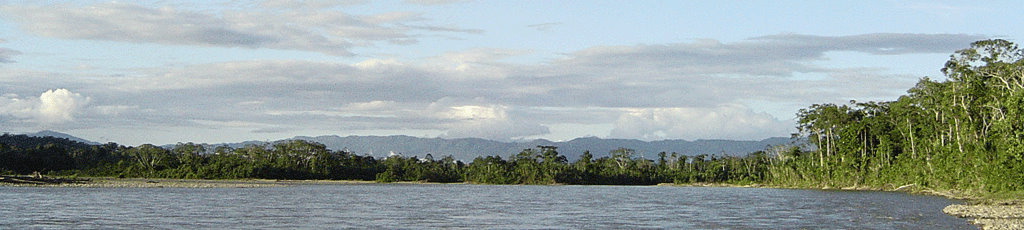
The Alto Madre de Dios River from the Fundo Mascoitania Reserve

The MLC is accessible from Cusco by road until Atalaya and then by lancha until the port at the MLC. During the dry season boats may not be able to navigate the river from Atalaya in which case transport is needed up until the Aguanos settlement on the opposite side of the Alto Madre de Dios River. Crossing is then possible by raft or by lancha.

== Biodiversity and wildlife ==
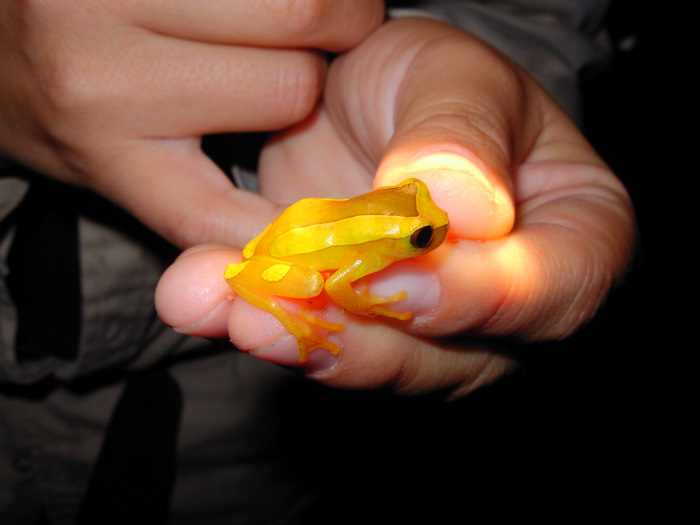
Dendropsophus leucophyllatus frog found in Fundo Mascoitania Reserve

Macaw Collpa

The MLC reserve attracts an array of parrots and macaws thanks to the spectacular clay mineral lick, or Collpa carved out by the Alto Madre de Dios river. This collpa is the only one of its type in the zone, and is visited daily by hundreds of colourful and noisy parrots and macaws, the most notable of these being the Blue Headed Macaw. These in turn draw raptors such as the ornate hawk eagle and crested eagle.

Mammal Collpa

The MLC boasts two large mammal collpas which attracts smaller mammals as well as large groups of white-lipped peccary and their natural Jaguar predators.

Wildlife Monitoring Array

The MLC's wildlife monitoring array was established in 2005. The array comprises a 1 km^{2} monitoring grid mapped using GPS. It provides a quantified area in which researchers can complete research on plants, animals and birds.

== Species lists and forest types ==
- List of mammal species catalogued within the MLC (by order, family, genus and species definitions)
- Lists of the birds catalogued within the MLC Reserve and the common plant species in forest types can be found on this link .
