= Rhadinoloricaria condei =

Conservation status
- Least Concern (IUCN 3.1)

Scientific classification
- Kingdom: Animalia
- Phylum: Chordata
- Class: Actinopterygii
- Order: Siluriformes
- Family: Loricariidae
- Genus: Rhadinoloricaria
- Species: R. condei

Binomial name
- Rhadinoloricaria condei (Isbrücker & Nijssen, 1986)

Synonyms
- Apistoloricaria condei Isbrücker & Nijssen, 1986

Species of fish

Rhadinoloricaria condei is a species of freshwater ray-finned fish belonging to the family Loricariidae, the suckermouth armored catfishes, and the subfamily Loricariinae, the mailed catfishes. This catfish is endemic to Ecuador where it is found in the Napo River basin. This species can be found in turbid and dark waters, in moderately fast flowing streams, between 2–10 m (6 ft 7 in – 32 ft 10 in) deep; no submerged vegetation is found here, and the bottom is made of sand, mud, dead leaves, twigs, branches, and trunks. This species grows to a standard length of 14.1 cm (5.6 in).

== Etymology ==
The catfish is named in honor of zoologist Bruno Condé (1920–2004), the director of the Aquarium Museum of Nancy.
