= Oxapampa poison frog =

Conservation status
- Critically Endangered (IUCN 3.1)

Scientific classification
- Kingdom: Animalia
- Phylum: Chordata
- Class: Amphibia
- Order: Anura
- Family: Dendrobatidae
- Genus: Ameerega
- Species: A. planipaleae

Binomial name
- Ameerega planipaleae (Morales and Velazco, 1998)

Synonyms
- Epipedobates planipaleae Morales and Velazco, 1998

Species of amphibian

A member of the Dendrobatidae family, the Oxapampa poison frog (Ameerega planipaleae; formerly Epipedobates planipaleae) is a diurnal, ground-dwelling frog endemic to the Oxapampa province of Peru. It has an extremely limited range, and has been observed between 1924 and 2200 meters above sea level in fields, forest edges, and high jungle forest in close proximity to streams and moving water.

The Oxapampa Poison Frog is rarely observed, so many details regarding the species remain unknown. Characteristics such as population size, diet, behavior (including mating practices and reproduction), sexual dimorphism, and predation risk remain largely unstudied.

The IUCN classifies A. planipaleae as critically endangered. It is one of two known endemic species of Oxapampa (the other being Atelopus oxapampae).

== Description ==
Dorsal coloring is predominantly dark brown or black, but becomes yellow-green at the head. The frog has two dorsolateral stripes. The upper stripe is yellow or green and begins at the head above the eye, stretching to the groin. The second set of bilateral stripes is thinner and runs from the snout to the elbow, below the eye. Ventral color pattern is mottled blue and black. Many individuals have a red-orange spot on the upper thighs, below the dominant dorsolateral stripe, as well as a red inguinal spot at the groin.

However, a study by Chavez et al. observed a wide range of variation in both coloring and presence in the species’ dorsolateral striping and thigh spots. Every recorded individual had two sets of dorsolateral stripes, but the exact coloration (entirely yellow or green compared to portions of the stripe containing shades of blue, red, orange, etc.) and presence of red thigh and inguinal spots varied.

Chavez notes these findings are significant because yellow dorsolateral stripes and red thigh spots were previously recommended traits to identify A. planipaleae. This may also indicate that the Oxapampa poison frog experiences higher variation in intra-species color patterning than other Ameerega species. Further study is needed on this topic.

Color pattern remains the quickest way to identify the Oxapampa Poison Frog.

== Geographic Range ==
Ameerega planipaleae is found only in the Oxapampa province of the Eastern Pasco region of Peru. Oxapampa is broadly classified as high jungle, but the province holds a range of ecosystems, from cloud forest to low valley farmland.

== Habitat ==
A. planipaleae is commonly observed in leaf litter near moving water, in secondary forest and disturbed habitats. Sightings have occurred at a pine plantation, disused fish farm, agriculture fields and plantations, recovering pastureland, and the grassy bank of a small trout pond. It is unclear if reports exist of the frog living in primary forest locations or within the borders of reserves such as Yanachaga-Chemillén National Park and Municipal Conservation Area Ameerega La Colina. However, it has been seen close to both locations.

Previous sightings recorded the frog’s elevation range between 1924 and 2080 meters above sea level. Three new sightings at 2,200 meters between 2024 and 2026 suggest a broader range (and larger population) than previously thought. Public record of A. planipaleae is limited, but the frog was seen as recently as April 2026, at 2,200 meters above sea level.

== Threats ==
A. planipaleae’s high altitude habitat and elusive nature make it difficult to accurately assess population abundance. However, due to its limited endemic range in Oxapampa and susceptibility to environmental factors, the frog is classified as critically endangered by The International Union for Conservation of Nature (IUCN)'s Red List of Threatened Species.

Agriculture presents the largest concerns to the A. planipaleae population, with habitat loss — particularly from granadilla (passion fruit) and rocoto (chili pepper) farming — and use of agrochemicals being primary threats. Selective logging, pollution, and climate change also present considerable challenges for the species.

Citizen science plays a vital role in learning more about the Oxapampa Poison Frog, as locals know the land and the species found there best. Locals can also take important conservation steps, such as avoiding agrochemical use and preventing habitat degradation.
