= Rhadinoloricaria =

Scientific classification
- Kingdom: Animalia
- Phylum: Chordata
- Class: Actinopterygii
- Order: Siluriformes
- Family: Loricariidae
- Subfamily: Loricariinae
- Genus: Rhadinoloricaria; Isbrücker & Nijssen, 1974

Type species
- Rhadinoloricaria macromystax (Günther, 1869)

Synonyms
- Apistoloricaria Isbrücker & Nijssen, 1986

Genus of fishes

Rhadinoloricaria is a genus of freshwater ray-finned fishes belonging to the family Loricariidae, the suckermouth armored catfishes, and the subfamily Loricariinae, the mailed catfishes. The catfishes in this genus are endemic to South America. It was considered to be monotypic until the 2020 discovery of a second species.

Rhadinoloricaria is part of the Pseudohemiodon group of the tribe Loricariini in the subfamily Loricariinae. Apistoloricaria and Crossoloricaria include fish that are very similar to Rhadinoloricaria, and it has been proposed that the former two genera be synonymized with the latter.

== Species ==
There are currently nine recognized species:

- Rhadinoloricaria andaki Provenzano, Chaves-Moreno, Ordoñez & Ortega-Lara, 2024
- Rhadinoloricaria bahuaja (F. Chang & E. Castro, 1999)
- Rhadinoloricaria condei (Isbrücker & Nijssen, 1986)
- Rhadinoloricaria laani (Nijssen & Isbrücker, 1988)
- Rhadinoloricaria listrorhinos (Nijssen & Isbrücker, 1988)
- Rhadinoloricaria macromystax (Günther, 1869)
- Rhadinoloricaria ommation (Nijssen & Isbrücker, 1988)
- Rhadinoloricaria rhami (Isbrücker & Nijssen, 1983)
- Rhadinoloricaria stewarti Provenzano & Barriga Salazar, 2020

== Distribution and habitat ==
Representatives of this genus are distributed in the upper Amazon and Orinoco drainages, along the Atlantic slope of the Andes.

== Appearance and ecology ==
These fish range from 10–14.2 centimetres (3.9–5.6 in) SL. In members of this genus and other closely related genera, the body is strongly depressed and the pelvic fins are used for locomotion, enabling these fish to appear to "walk" on the substrate. Sexual dimorphism is apparent through differentiated lip structure. The lip surfaces of the male are rather papillose while those of the female are filamentous.

These species are abdomino-lip brooders; eggs are laid in a single layered mass, and are attached to the surface of the lower lip and abdomen of the male.
