= Confusing poison frog =

Conservation status
- Data Deficient (IUCN 3.1)

Scientific classification
- Kingdom: Animalia
- Phylum: Chordata
- Class: Amphibia
- Order: Anura
- Family: Dendrobatidae
- Genus: Ameerega
- Species: A. maculata

Binomial name
- Ameerega maculata (Peters, 1873)

Synonyms
- Dendrobates trivittatus var. maculata Peters, 1873; Dendrobates maculatus Myers, 1982; Epipedobates maculatus (Peters, 1873)

Species of amphibian

The confusing poison frog (Ameerega maculata) is a species of frog in the family Dendrobatidae endemic to Panama. It is only known from its type locality, "Chiriqui" (which at the time of the description included both Atlantic and Pacific versants of western Panama).

Its natural habitat is unknown but might be forest. It is threatened by habitat loss and may already be extinct given the level of deforestation within the region of collection.
