= Rhadinoloricaria listrorhinos =

Conservation status
- Data Deficient (IUCN 3.1)

Scientific classification
- Kingdom: Animalia
- Phylum: Chordata
- Class: Actinopterygii
- Order: Siluriformes
- Family: Loricariidae
- Genus: Rhadinoloricaria
- Species: R. listrorhinos

Binomial name
- Rhadinoloricaria listrorhinos (Isbrücker & Nijssen, 1988)

Synonyms
- Apistoloricaria listrorhinos Nijssen & Isbrücker, 1988

Species of fish

Rhadinoloricaria listrorhinos is a species of freshwater ray-finned fish belonging to the family Loricariidae, the suckermouth armored catfishes, and the subfamily Loricariinae, the mailed catfishes. This catfish is endemic to Colombia, where its only known locality is on the Metica River. This species grows to a standard length of 13.6 cm (5.4 in).
