= Ameerega kuriinti =

Scientific classification
- Kingdom: Animalia
- Phylum: Chordata
- Class: Amphibia
- Order: Anura
- Family: Dendrobatidae
- Genus: Ameerega
- Species: A. kuriinti

Binomial name
- Ameerega kuriinti Geralds, Twomey, Deutsch, Chávez, and Brown, 2026

Species of frog

Ameerega kuriinti, known commonly as Inti poison frog, is a species of poison dart frog in the family Dendrobatidae. It is endemic to Peru and occurs in the Department of San Martín. The species was formally described in 2026 by Geralds, Twomey, Deutsch, Chávez and Brown.
