= Rhadinoloricaria laani =

Conservation status
- Least Concern (IUCN 3.1)

Scientific classification
- Kingdom: Animalia
- Phylum: Chordata
- Class: Actinopterygii
- Order: Siluriformes
- Family: Loricariidae
- Genus: Rhadinoloricaria
- Species: R. laani

Binomial name
- Rhadinoloricaria laani (Isbrücker & Nijssen, 1988)

Synonyms
- Apistoloricaria laani Nijssen & Isbrücker, 1988

Species of fish

Rhadinoloricaria laani is a species of freshwater ray-finned fish belonging to the family Loricariidae, the suckermouth armored catfishes, and the subfamily Loricariinae, the mailed catfishes. This catfish occurs in Brazil, Colombia and Venezuela in the drainage systems of the Amazon and Orinoco rivers. This species grows to a standard length of 13.0 cm (5.1 in).

== Etymology ==
The catfish is named in honor of Louis André van der Laan, of the Zoölogisch Museum in Amsterdam.
