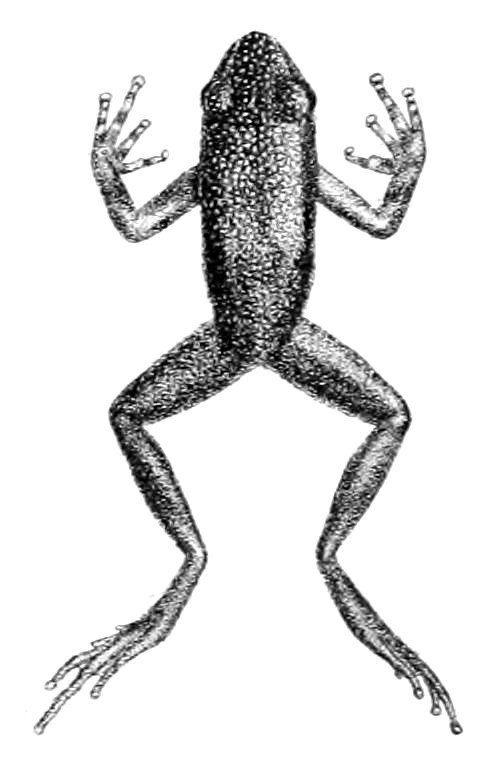

Conservation status
- Least Concern (IUCN 3.1)

Scientific classification
- Kingdom: Animalia
- Phylum: Chordata
- Class: Amphibia
- Order: Anura
- Family: Dendrobatidae
- Genus: Ameerega
- Species: A. parvula

Binomial name
- Ameerega parvula Boulenger, 1882

Synonyms
- Dendrobates parvulus Boulenger, 1882; Prostherapis festae Peracca, 1904; Phyllobates festae Barbour and Noble, 1920; Colostethus festae Edwards, 1971; Phyllobates parvulus Silverstone, 1975; Dendrobates parvulus Myers, Daly, and Malkin, 1978; Epipedobates parvulus Myers, 1987; Phyllobates (Pseudendrobates) parvulus Bauer, 1988; Ameerega parvula Frost et al., 2006

= Ameerega parvula =

Species of amphibian

Ameerega parvula is a species of poison dart frog that lives in Colombia, Ecuador and Peru.

== Description ==
The size of Ameerega parvula ranges between 17.5 and 24 mm. Mature frogs display a black base color and a dark red spotted back. Their body and limb undersides exhibit either black with blue marbling or blue with black marbling. The marbling pattern extends partially onto the body's sides. Additionally, there is an unfinished light blue stripe that starts at the forelimbs, runs along the upper lip, and concludes near the outer edge of the eye or nostril.

== Reproduction ==
The female frog lays her eggs on the ground. After the eggs hatch, the frogs carry the tadpoles to water.

The tadpoles measure 12.10 to 27.13 mm long during stages 25–40. They are brown in color with dark brown-black spots. The tail is light brown near the body and lighter gray-tan near the end. There are small gray and brown spots on the tail. The top fin is clear. The belly is transparent and the intestines are visible.

Young frogs are blue-black in color. Some of them do not have spots.

== Etymology ==
Scientists named this frog parvula from the Latin word parvulus, "young."

== Habitat ==
This diurnal frog has been observed on the leaf litter near streams in rainforests, including secondary rainforests. Scientists observed the frog between 150 and 1200 meters above sea level.

The frog's range includes several protected parks, for example Parque Nacional Yasuní, Parque Nacional Sangay, Limoncocha Reserva Biológica, and the Santiago Comaina Reserved Zone.

== Threats ==
The IUCN classifies this frog as least concern of extinction. In some places, it suffers habitat loss associated with agriculture and livestock cultivation. There may be some international pet trade.
