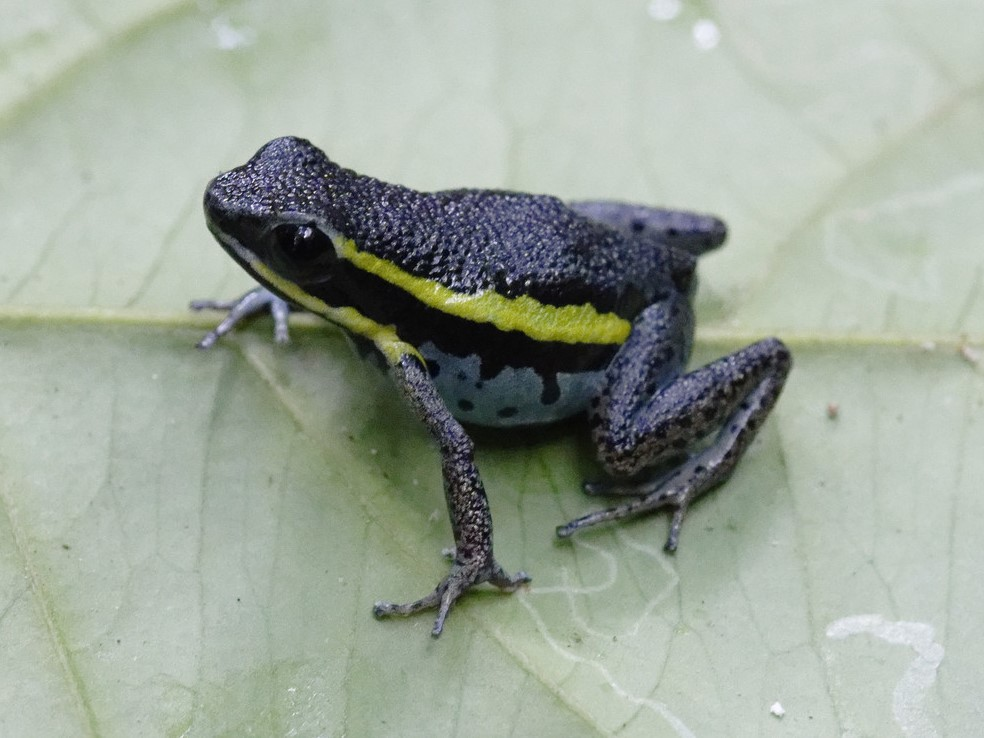

Conservation status
- Vulnerable (IUCN 3.1)

Scientific classification
- Kingdom: Animalia
- Phylum: Chordata
- Class: Amphibia
- Order: Anura
- Family: Dendrobatidae
- Genus: Ameerega
- Species: A. pongoensis

Binomial name
- Ameerega pongoensis (Schulte, 1999)

Synonyms
- Epipedobates pongoensis Schulte, 1999

= Ameerega pongoensis =

Species of frog

Ameerega pongoensis, formerly Epipedobates pongoensis, is a species of frog in the family Dendrobatidae that is endemic to the San Martín and Loreto Regions of Peru.

== Habitat ==
This frog lives in primary and secondary forest and lowland riparian forest. The frog has been observed exclusively near streams with slow-moving current. Scientists saw the frog between 200 and 800 meters above sea level.

The frog's known range includes two protected parks: Cordillera Azul National Park and Cordillera Escalera Regional Conservation Area.

== Young ==
The tadpoles have been observed in slow-moving streams.

== Threats ==
The IUCN classifies this frog as vulnerable to extinction. Its principal threat is habitat loss associated with agriculture, especially commercial palm cultivation. It is also illegally harvested for international trade.
