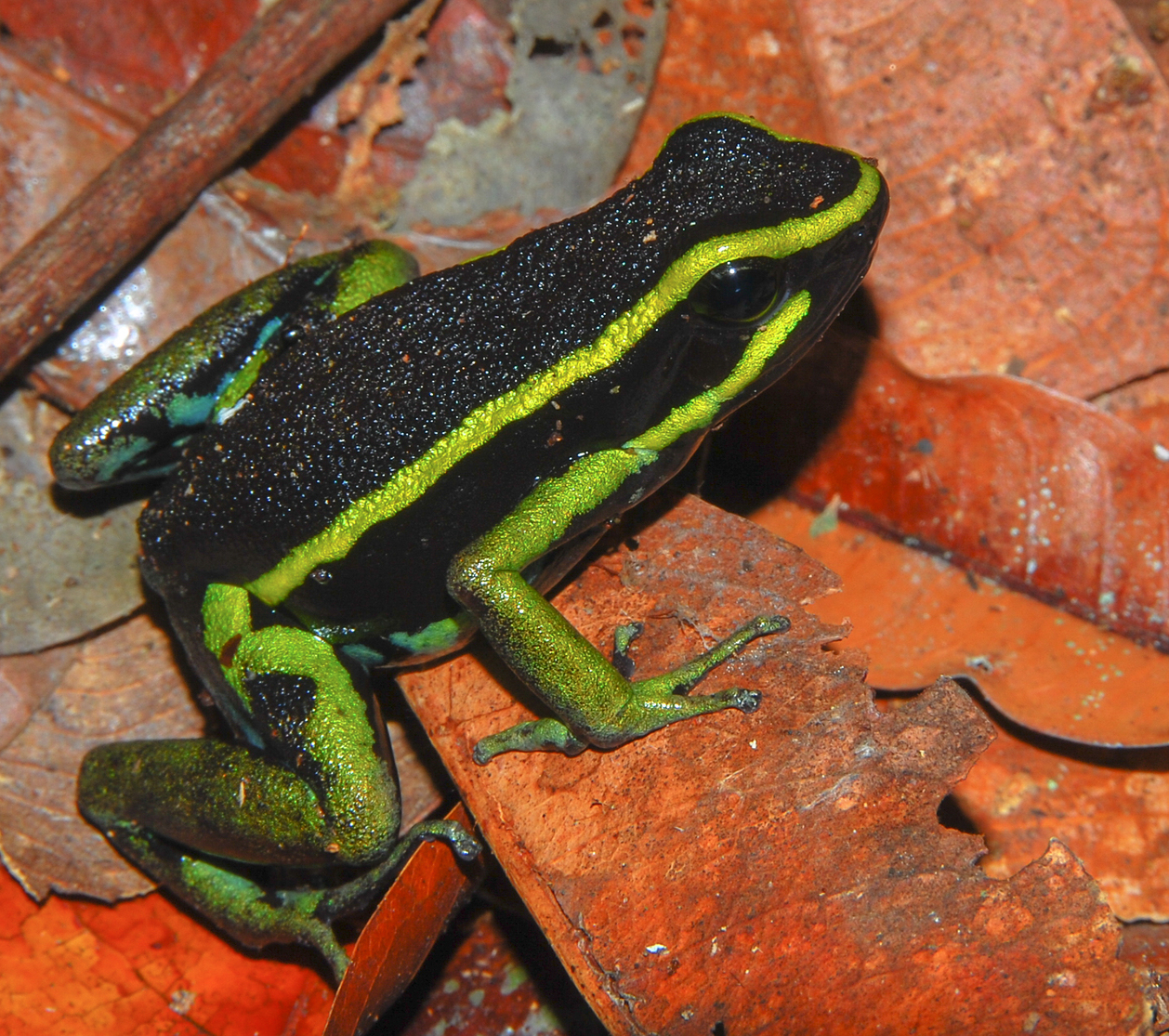
- Ameerega trivittata

Scientific classification
- Kingdom: Animalia
- Phylum: Chordata
- Class: Amphibia
- Order: Anura
- Family: Dendrobatidae
- Subfamily: Colostethinae
- Genus: Ameerega; Bauer, 1986

Diversity
- See text

= Ameerega =

Genus of amphibians

Ameerega is a genus of poison dart frogs in the family Dendrobatidae. These frogs live around rocks that are nearby streams. They are found in central South America north to Panama. It contains many former species of the genus Epipedobates.

== Species ==
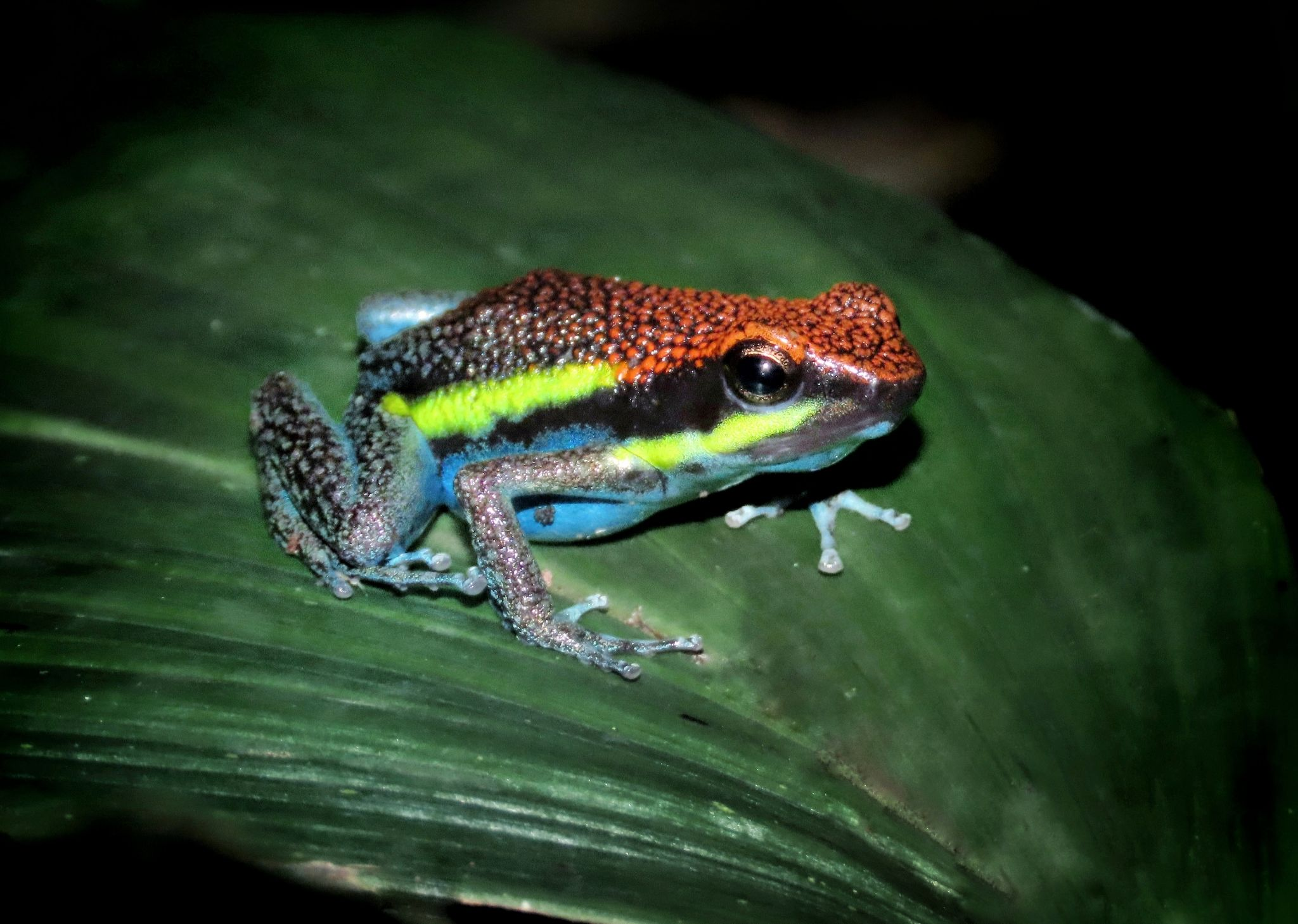
Ameerega macero

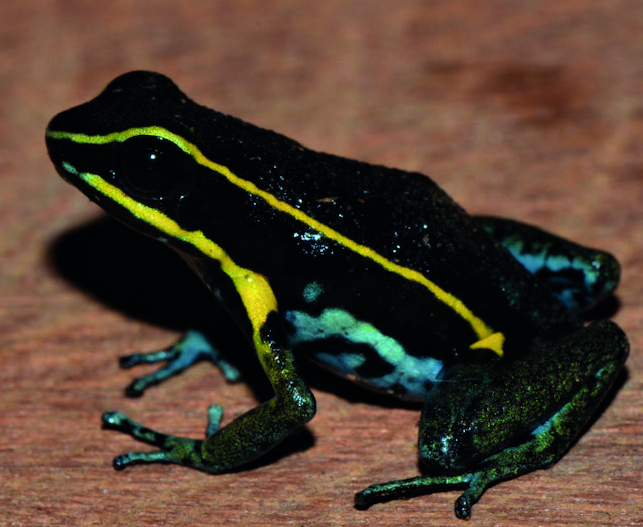
Ameerega pulchripecta

The following species are recognised in the genus Ameerega:

- Ameerega altamazonica (Twomey and Brown, 2008)
- Ameerega bassleri (Melin, 1941)
- Ameerega berohoka Vaz-Silva and Maciel, 2011
- Ameerega bilinguis (Jungfer, 1989)
- Ameerega boehmei Lötters, Schmitz, Reichle, Rödder, and Quennet, 2009
- Ameerega boliviana (Boulenger, 1902)
- Ameerega braccata (Steindachner, 1864)
- Ameerega cainarachi (Schulte, 1989)
- Ameerega flavopicta (Lutz, 1925)
- Ameerega hahneli (Boulenger, 1884)
- Ameerega ignipedis Brown and Twomey, 2009
- Ameerega imasmari (Brown, 2019)
- Ameerega ingeri (Cochran and Goin, 1970)
- Ameerega kuriinti (Geralds, Twomey, Deutsch, Chávez & Brown, 2026)
- Ameerega labialis (Cope, 1874)
- Ameerega macero (Rodriguez and Myers, 1993)
- Ameerega maculata (Peters, 1873)
- Ameerega munduruku Neves et al, 2017
- Ameerega panguana (Brown, 2019)
- Ameerega parvula (Boulenger, 1882)
- Ameerega pepperi Brown and Twomey, 2009
- Ameerega peruviridis Bauer, 1986
- Ameerega petersi (Silverstone, 1976)
- Ameerega picta (Bibron, 1838)
- Ameerega planipaleae (Morales and Velazco, 1998)
- Ameerega pongoensis (Schulte, 1999)
- Ameerega pulchripecta (Silverstone, 1976)
- Ameerega rubriventris (Lötters et al, 1997)
- Ameerega shihuemoy (Serrano, 2017)
- Ameerega silverstonei (Myers and Daly, 1979)
- Ameerega simulans (Myers, Rodriguez, and Icochea, 1998)
- Ameerega trivittata (Spix, 1824)
- Ameerega yoshina Brown and Twomey, 2009
- Ameerega yungicola (Lötters, Schmitz, and Reichle, 2005)
