= Rhadinoloricaria ommation =

Conservation status
- Least Concern (IUCN 3.1)

Scientific classification
- Kingdom: Animalia
- Phylum: Chordata
- Class: Actinopterygii
- Order: Siluriformes
- Family: Loricariidae
- Genus: Rhadinoloricaria
- Species: R. ommation

Binomial name
- Rhadinoloricaria ommation (Isbrücker & Nijssen, 1988)

Synonyms
- Apistoloricaria ommation Nijssen & Isbrücker, 1988

Species of fish

Rhadinoloricaria ommation is a species of freshwater ray-finned fish belonging to the family Loricariidae, the suckermouth armored catfishes, and the subfamily Loricariinae, the mailed catfishes. This catfish is found in the lower Marañón River basin, in Peru and is thought to also occur in the Madeira, Mamoré and Solimões drainage systems of Brazil and Colombia. This species grows to a standard length of 9.8 cm (3.9 in).
