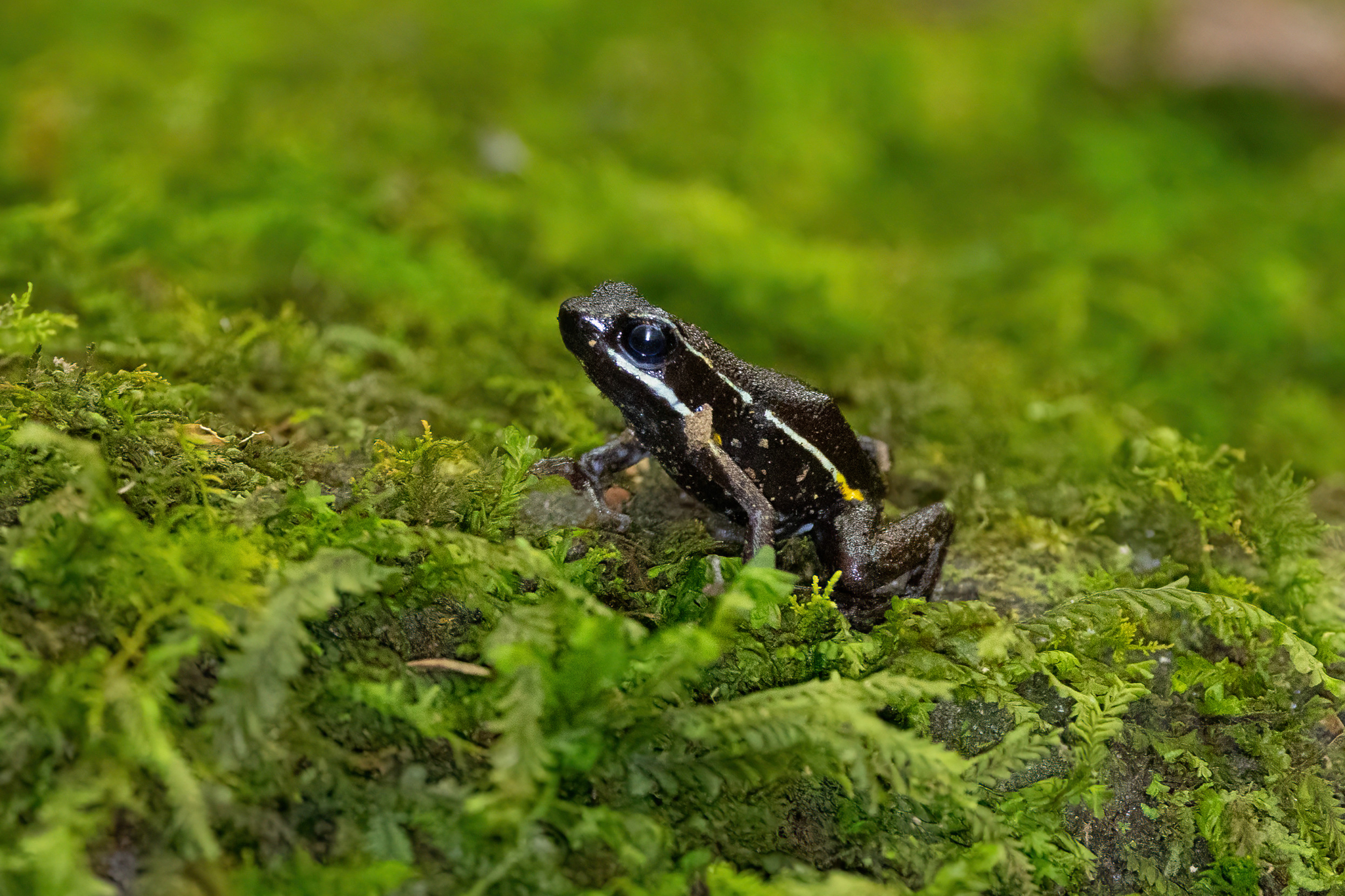

Conservation status
- Least Concern (IUCN 3.1)

Scientific classification
- Kingdom: Animalia
- Phylum: Chordata
- Class: Amphibia
- Order: Anura
- Family: Dendrobatidae
- Genus: Ameerega
- Species: A. altamazonica

Binomial name
- Ameerega altamazonica Twomey and Brown, 2008

Synonyms
- Ameerega altamazonica Twomey and Brown, 2008

= Ameerega altamazonica =

Species of frog

Ameerega altamazonica is a small species of poison dart frog that lives in central Peru described in 2008. It can be found at an elevation of 150–865 m.

== Description ==
The adult frog of 18–24.5 mm are slightly larger than males that measure on average 17.4–22.9 mm (a sign of sexual dimorphism). These frogs differ in color geographically. Mostly, the skin of the frog's back is black or dark brown in color with two white stripes, one set from the head to the vent, and another set from the lips to the forelegs. Frogs that live further north are darker in color. Frogs that live in the southernmost part of the range have copper-colored skin and orange flash coloration.

Scientists infer from this frog's aposematic coloration that it is toxic, like its congeners.

== Habitat ==
This frog is found in a range of habitats, including disturbed habitats, but only occasionally secondary forest. It is usually found near roads or streams. It can be found at an elevation of 150–865 m.

The frog's known range includes at least one protected park, Parque Nacional Río Abiseo. Scientists think it might also live in Área de Conservación Cordillera Escalera and Parque Nacional Cordillera Azul.

== Reproduction ==
The male frog perches on the dead leaves on the ground and calls to the female frogs. His voice sounds like "peep." Scientists have not observed the female frog laying eggs in the wild, but captive frogs lay eggs on leaf litter or other leaves near the ground. She lays 14–22 eggs per clutch. After the eggs hatch, the adult male frog carries the tadpoles tow water.

The tadpoles are dark brown in color with two white spots, one on each side of the mouth.

== Threats ==
The IUCN classifies this animal as least concern of extinction. It enjoys a large range and has some tolerance to habitat disturbance. This frog does appear on the international pet trade, but scientists say this is not a major threat. There seems to be less demand for this frog than for other frogs.

== Original description ==
- Twomey E; Brown JL (2008). "A partial revision of the Ameerega hahneli complex (Anura: Dendrobatidae) and a new cryptic species from the East-Andean versant of central Peru". Zootaxa. 1757: 49–65.
