= Rhadinoloricaria bahuaja =

Conservation status
- Least Concern (IUCN 3.1)

Scientific classification
- Kingdom: Animalia
- Phylum: Chordata
- Class: Actinopterygii
- Division: Teleostei
- Order: Siluriformes
- Family: Loricariidae
- Genus: Rhadinoloricaria
- Species: R. bahuaja

Binomial name
- Rhadinoloricaria bahuaja (Fonchi Chang & Edgardo Castro, 1999)

Synonyms
- Crossoloricaria bahuaja F. Chang & E. Castro, 1999

Species of fish

Rhadinoloricaria bahuaja is a species of freshwater ray-finned fish belonging to the family Loricariidae, the suckermouth armored catfishes, and the subfamily Loricariinae, the mailed catfishes. It is found in Peru, where it is found in the Madre de Dios River basin, and Bolivia, where it is found in the Rio Grande and the Rio Manuripe. This species grows to a standard length of 16.4 cm (6.5 in).

== Ecology ==
Stomach contents of R. bahuaja include larvae of aquatic insects, small seeds and debris. R. bahuaja males have been found carrying eggs on their lips.
