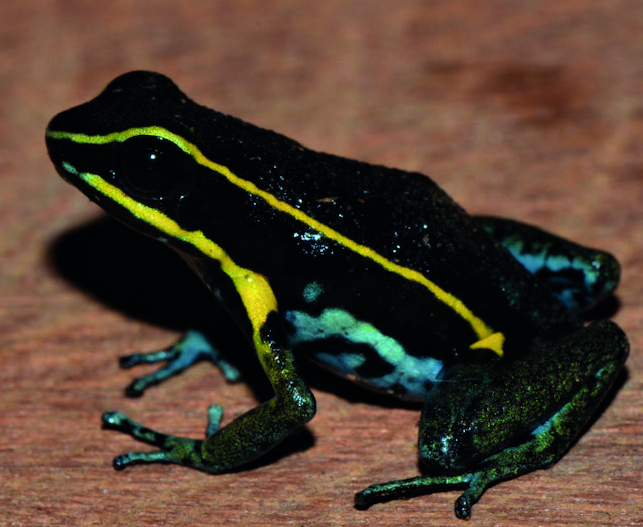
- Amapá, Brazil

Conservation status
- Least Concern (IUCN 3.1)

Scientific classification
- Kingdom: Animalia
- Phylum: Chordata
- Class: Amphibia
- Order: Anura
- Family: Dendrobatidae
- Genus: Ameerega
- Species: A. pulchripecta

Binomial name
- Ameerega pulchripecta (Silverstone, 1976)

= Ameerega pulchripecta =

Species of frog

Ameerega pulchripecta, formerly Epipedobates pulchripecta, is a species of frog in the family Dendrobatidae endemic to Brazil.

== Habitat and range ==
This frog lives in the Amazon biome, where it has been observed between 100 and 310 meters above sea level on rainforest leaf litter.

Scientists have observed this frog exclusively in protected parks, including Floresta Nacional do Amapá and Parque Natural Municipal do Cancão.

== Reproduction ==
The adult male frogs perch in crevices in plant roots no higher than 40 cm above the forest floor. Then they call to the female frogs. Scientists believe that the female frog lays her eggs on the ground and that, after the eggs hatch, the adult frogs carry the tadpoles to water.

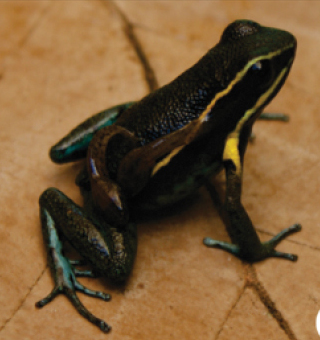
With tadpoles. Amapá, Brazil

== Threats ==
The IUCN classifies this frog as least concern of extinction. There is some habitat loss in its range associated with logging, mining, and agriculture. It is possible that this frog may be sold as part of the international pet trade, though there are no confirmed reports. Scientists believe that this does not pose a threat to the overall population as of 2022.
