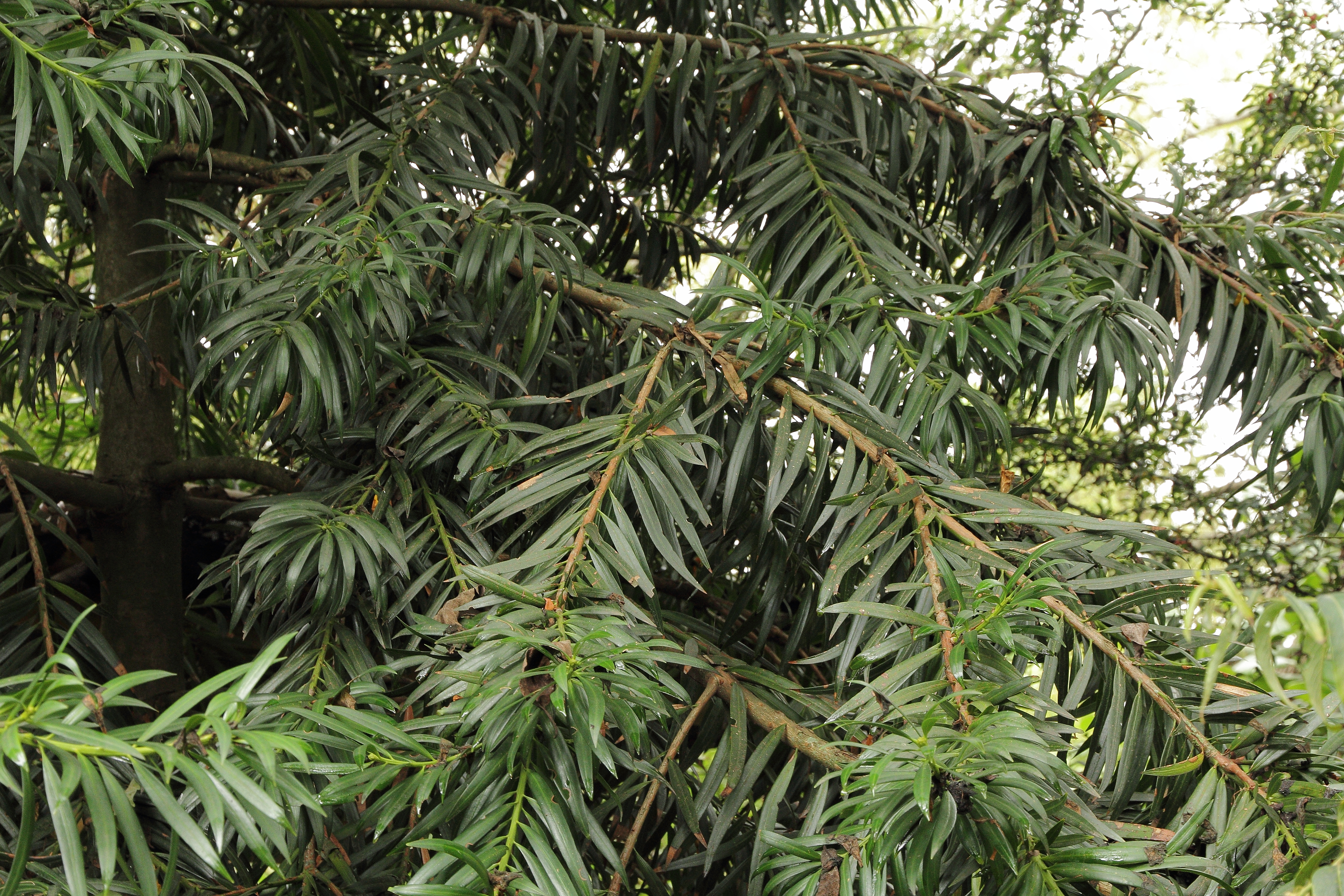
- Leaves

Conservation status
- Least Concern (IUCN 3.1)

Scientific classification
- Kingdom: Plantae
- Clade: Tracheophytes
- Clade: Gymnosperms
- Division: Pinophyta
- Class: Pinopsida
- Order: Araucariales
- Family: Podocarpaceae
- Genus: Podocarpus
- Species: P. oleifolius

Binomial name
- Podocarpus oleifolius D.Don

Subspecies
- Podocarpus oleifolius subsp. costaricensis (J.Buchholz & N.E.Gray) Silba; Podocarpus oleifolius subsp. oleifolius

Synonyms
- Nageia oleifolia (D.Don) Kuntze; synonyms of subsp. costaricensis: Podocarpus oleifolius var. costaricensis J.Buchholz & N.E.Gray; Podocarpus monteverdeensis de Laub.; synonyms of subsp. oleifolius: Nageia macrostachya (Parl.) Kuntze; Podocarpus ballivianensis Silba; Podocarpus ingensis de Laub.; Podocarpus macrostachys Parl.; Podocarpus oleifolius subsp. columbianus A.D.Silba & J.A.Silva; Podocarpus oleifolius subsp. equadorensis (Silba) Silba; Podocarpus oleifolius var. equadorensis Silba; Podocarpus oleifolius var. macrostachys (Parl.) J.Buchholz & N.E.Gray; Podocarpus oleifolius var. trujillensis J.Buchholz & N.E.Gray; Podocarpus oleifolius subsp. trujillensis (J.Buchholz & N.E.Gray) Silba

= Podocarpus oleifolius =

Species of conifer

Podocarpus oleifolius is a species of conifer in the family Podocarpaceae. It is a tree native to Colombia, Costa Rica, Ecuador, El Salvador, Guatemala, Honduras, southern Mexico, Panama, Peru, and northwestern Venezuela.

Podocarpus oleifolius contains one subspecies, P. oleifolius subsp. costaricensis, which is considered to encompass all Central American examples of the species.
