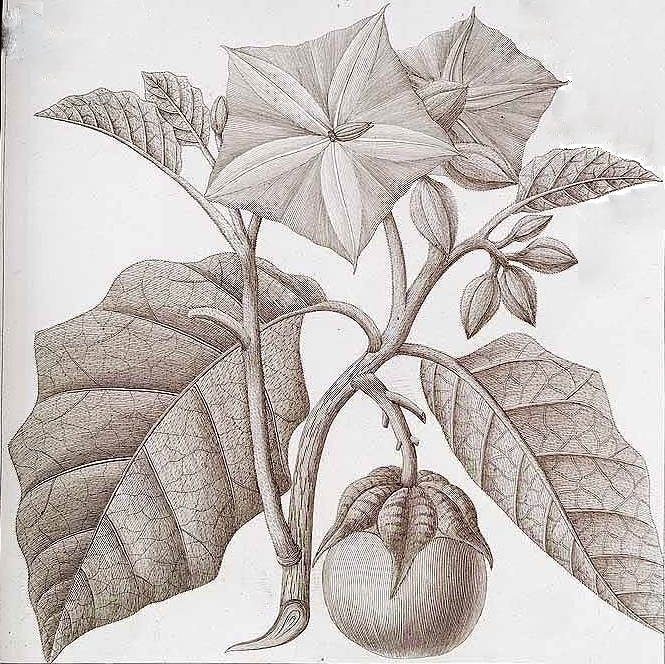

Conservation status
- Least Concern (IUCN 3.1)

Scientific classification
- Kingdom: Plantae
- Clade: Tracheophytes
- Clade: Angiosperms
- Clade: Eudicots
- Clade: Asterids
- Order: Solanales
- Family: Solanaceae
- Genus: Solanum
- Species: S. grandiflorum

Binomial name
- Solanum grandiflorum Ruiz & Pav.

Synonyms
- Solanum astroites Jacq.

= Solanum grandiflorum =

Species of tree

Solanum grandiflorum is a species of evergreen tree or treelet in the family Solanaceae. It is native to the wet lowland forests of the Amazon Basin; currently reported in Bolivia, Brazil, Colombia, Ecuador and Peru at 150–1600 meters above sea level.
