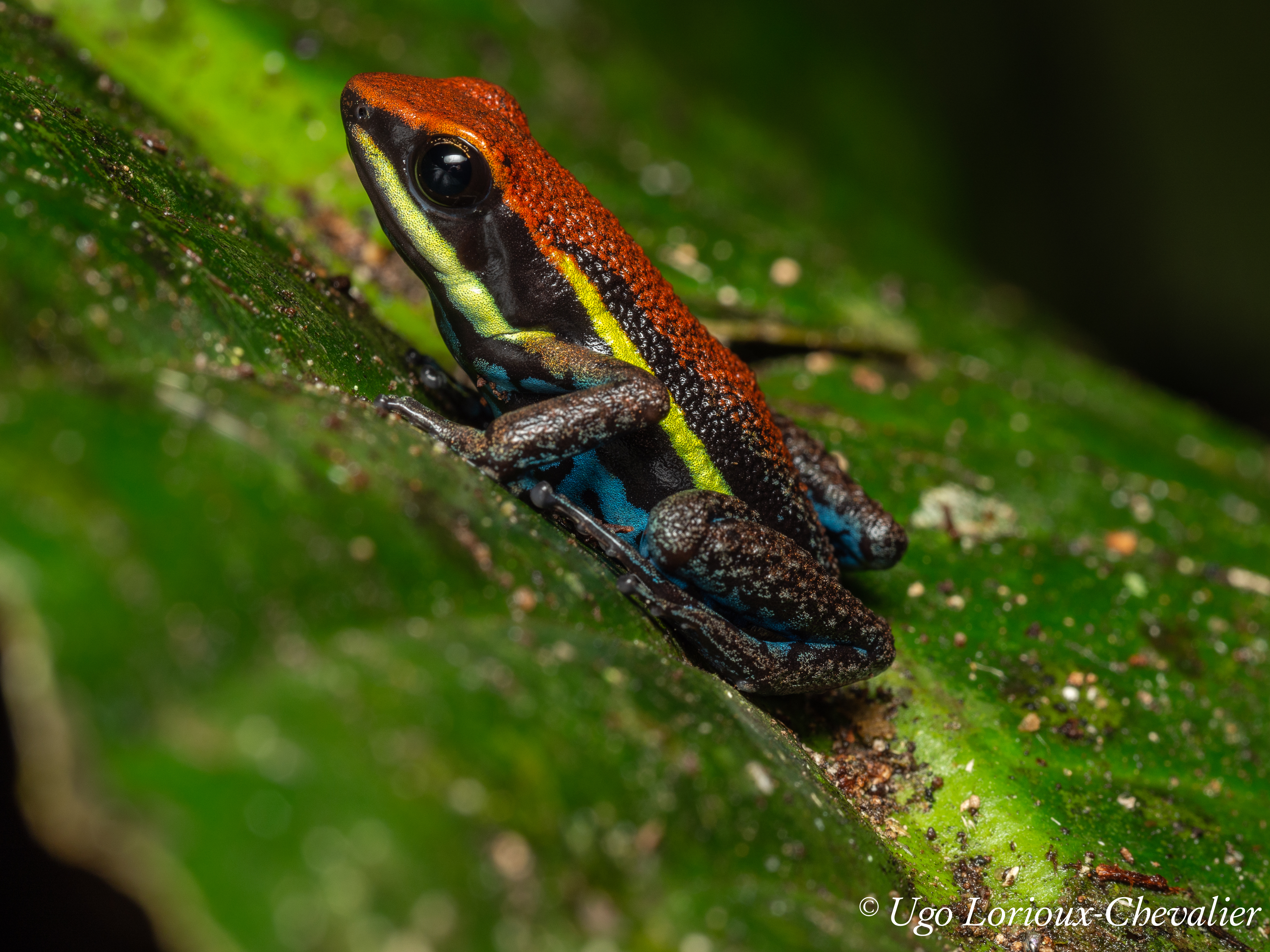

Conservation status
- Endangered (IUCN 3.1)

Scientific classification
- Kingdom: Animalia
- Phylum: Chordata
- Class: Amphibia
- Order: Anura
- Family: Dendrobatidae
- Genus: Ameerega
- Species: A. cainarachi

Binomial name
- Ameerega cainarachi (Schulte, 1989)

Synonyms
- Epipedobates cainarachi Schulte, 1989; Epipedobates ardens Jungfer, 1989

= Cainarachi poison frog =

Species of amphibian

The Cainarachi poison frog (Ameerega cainarachi) is a species of frog in the family Dendrobatidae. It is endemic to Amazonian Peru and found in the lowlands adjacent to the northern end of the Eastern Andes. It was named after the Rio Cainarache Valley, where it was first discovered.

== Taxonomy ==
Ameerega cainarachi was described as Epipedobates cainarachi by Rainer Schulte in a publication that appeared in May 1989, and as Epipedobates ardens by Karl-Heinz Jungfer in a publication that appeared in July 1989. The species was placed in Ameerega in the major revision of dendrobatids in 2006.

== Description ==
Males measure 25–26 mm (0.98–1.02 in) and females 28–31 mm (1.1–1.2 in) in snout–vent length. The back of this species is red. The sides are black.

== Habitat and conservation ==
Habitat for this species includes lowland forests between 150 m (490 ft) to 1,051 m (3,448 ft) above sea level. It is threatened by habitat loss caused by deforestation, as its native forests are cleared for agriculture (e.g., coffee and livestock production) and subsistence wood collection. Poison dart frogs, in general, are threatened by the capture and sale of wild individuals for the pet trade; A. cainarachi is also likely affected by this poaching.
