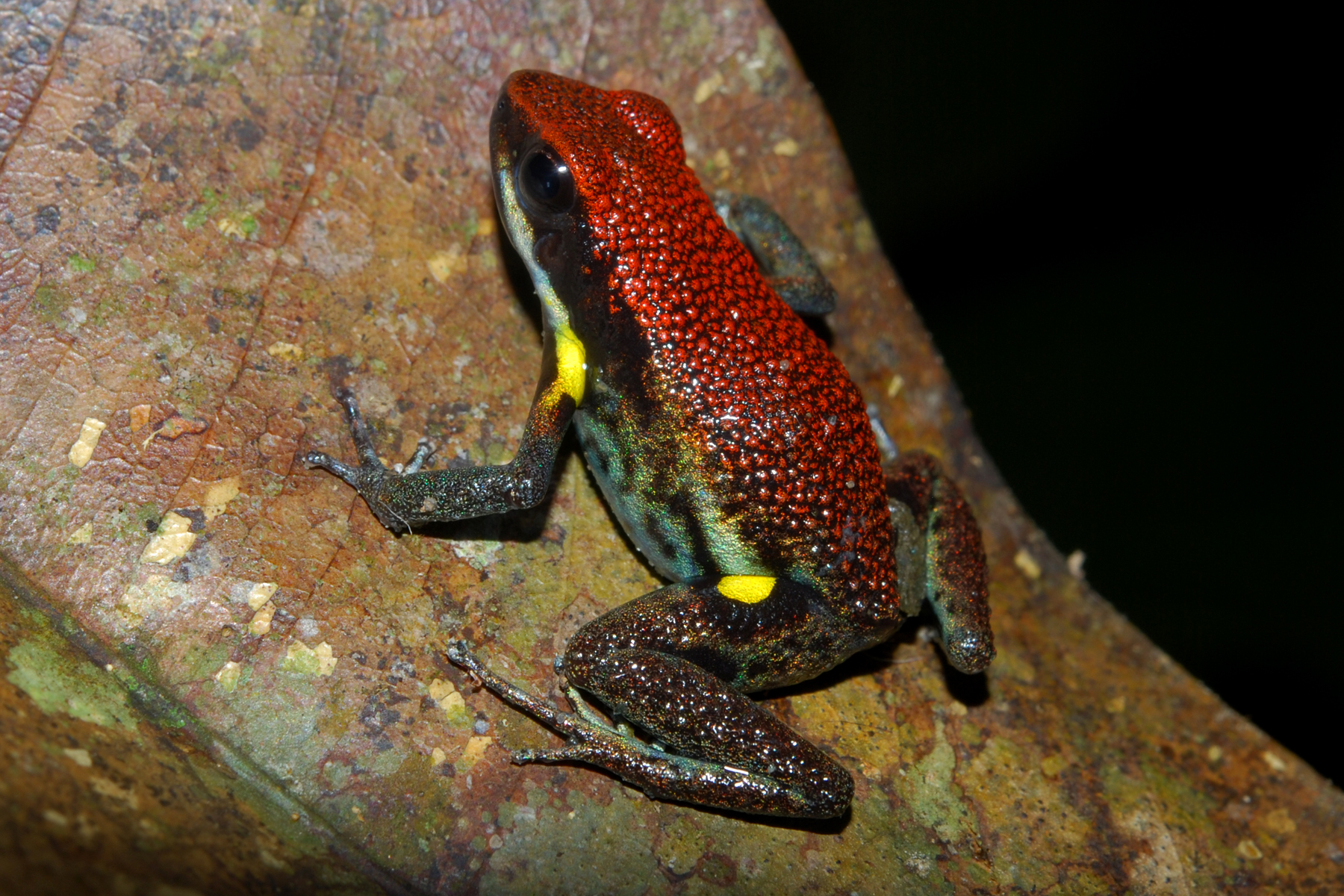
- In Ecuador

Conservation status
- Least Concern (IUCN 3.1)

Scientific classification
- Kingdom: Animalia
- Phylum: Chordata
- Class: Amphibia
- Order: Anura
- Family: Dendrobatidae
- Genus: Ameerega
- Species: A. bilinguis

Binomial name
- Ameerega bilinguis (Jungfer, 1989)

Synonyms
- Epipedobates bilinguis Jungfer, 1989

= Ameerega bilinguis =

Species of amphibian

Ameerega bilinguis, the Ecuador poison frog, is a species of frogs in the family Dendrobatidae found in Colombia, Ecuador, and possibly Peru.

== Etymology ==
Scientists gave this frog the Latin name bilinguis for its two-pulsed call.

== Habitat ==
This terrestrial frog's natural habitats are subtropical or tropical moist lowland primary forest and secondary forests, including areas that flood for part of the year, though the frogs only live there when they are not flooded. The frog has been found on the leaf litter between 125 and 800 meters above sea level.

The frog's range includes protected parks: Parque Nacional Yasuni, Reserva Biólogica Limoncocha, and Reserva de Produccion Faunística.

== Description ==
The adult male measures 16.5–20.2 mm in snout-vent length and the adult female frog 18.6–22.7 mm. The skin of the frog's back is black in color with red marks. The ventral areas are light blue in color with black bars with diffuse margins. The flanks are black with a light blue stripe. There is more blue color toward the vent. The tops of the feet are dark gray in color. There are yellow marks near where the legs meet the body. The iris of the eye is black in color. The sides of the head are black with some blue marks.

The flashy and brilliant colors of this species constitutes a warning for its potential predators that its skin produces poison, a feature that makes it an undesirable food source.

== Reproduction ==
It is very common to hear the male singing from slightly elevated areas in search of a female.

The female frog lays eggs on the leaf litter, 4 to 16 eggs per clutch. They measure about 2 mm in diameter. The male frog watches the eggs. The eggs take 18 to 22 days to open. After the eggs hatch, the male frog carries the tadpoles to pools of water or to streams with slow current.

== Threats ==
The IUCN classifies this frog as least concern of extinction. Habitat loss is a problem in some parts of its range, associated with agriculture and logging.

== Poison ==
This frog secretes a deadly neurotoxins called epibatidine, N-methylepibatidine, phantasmidine.
