= Ameerega boliviana =

Conservation status
- Near Threatened (IUCN 3.1)

Scientific classification
- Kingdom: Animalia
- Phylum: Chordata
- Class: Amphibia
- Order: Anura
- Family: Dendrobatidae
- Genus: Ameerega
- Species: A. boliviana

Binomial name
- Ameerega boliviana (Boulenger, 1902)

Synonyms
- Prostherapis bolivianus Boulenger, 1902; Phyllobates bolivianus Barbour and Noble, 1920; Colostethus bolivianus Edwards, 1971; Dendrobates bolivianus Myers, Daly, and Malkin, 1978; Epipedobates bolivianus Myers, 1987; Ameerega boliviana Frost, Grant, Faivovich, Bain, Haas, Haddad, de Sá, Channing, Wilkinson, Donnellan, Raxworthy, Campbell, Blotto, Moler, Drewes, Nussbaum, Lynch, Green, and Wheeler, 2006

Species of frog

Ameerega boliviana, formerly Epipedobates bolivianus, is a species of frog in the family Dendrobatidae endemic to Bolivia.

== Habitat ==
This terrestrial frog has been observed in riparian forests in Yungas. People have also seen it in grassy places where animals eat grass. Scientists observed the frog between 800 and 1400 meters above sea level. This frog can tolerate disturbed habitat so long as there is sufficient humidity.

The frog's range includes protected parks: Pilón Lajas Biosphere Reserve, Area Natural de Manejo Integado Nacional Apolobamba, and Area Protegida Municipal Cabeceras de Maniqui.

== Reproduction ==
The male frog sits near the edge of the forest and calls to the female frogs. The female frog lays eggs on the ground. After the eggs hatch, the male frogs carry the tadpoles to water, for example streams.

== Threats ==
The IUCN classifies this frog as near threatened. It suffers from habitat loss associated with wood collection, landslides, road construction, agriculture, and cattle pasturage. Scientists also cite climate change as a possible threat, as that could affect rainfall.
