= Ameerega simulans =

Conservation status
- Least Concern (IUCN 3.1)

Scientific classification
- Kingdom: Animalia
- Phylum: Chordata
- Class: Amphibia
- Order: Anura
- Family: Dendrobatidae
- Genus: Ameerega
- Species: A. simulans

Binomial name
- Ameerega simulans (Myers, Rodriguez, and Icochea, 1998)

Synonyms
- Epipedobates simulans Myers, Rodríguez, and Icochea, 1998; Ameerega simulans Frost, Grant, Faivovich, Bain, Haas, Haddad, de Sá, Channing, Wilkinson, Donnellan, Raxworthy, Campbell, Blotto, Moler, Drewes, Nussbaum, Lynch, Green, and Wheeler, 2006

Species of frog

Ameerega simulans is a small to medium-sized species of poison dart frog that lives in Peru in Puno described in 1998. It can be found at an elevation of 400–600 m.

== Description ==
Females with average size of 23.6–27 mm are slightly larger than males that measure on average 18.9–22.4 mm (a sign of sexual dimorphism).

== Habitat ==
This frog lives in lowland and submontane rainforests, where it has been observed on the leaf litter. Scientists saw the frog between 300 and 600 meters above sea level.

The frog's known range includes two protected parks: Bahuaja-Sonene National Park and Manu Biosphere Reserve.

== Reproduction ==
The female frog lays eggs on the ground. After the eggs hatch, the male frog carries the tadpoles to water.

== Threats ==
The IUCN classifies this frog as least concern of extinction. It suffers from localized habitat loss in some parts of its range, usually associated with agriculture and livestock cultivation.
