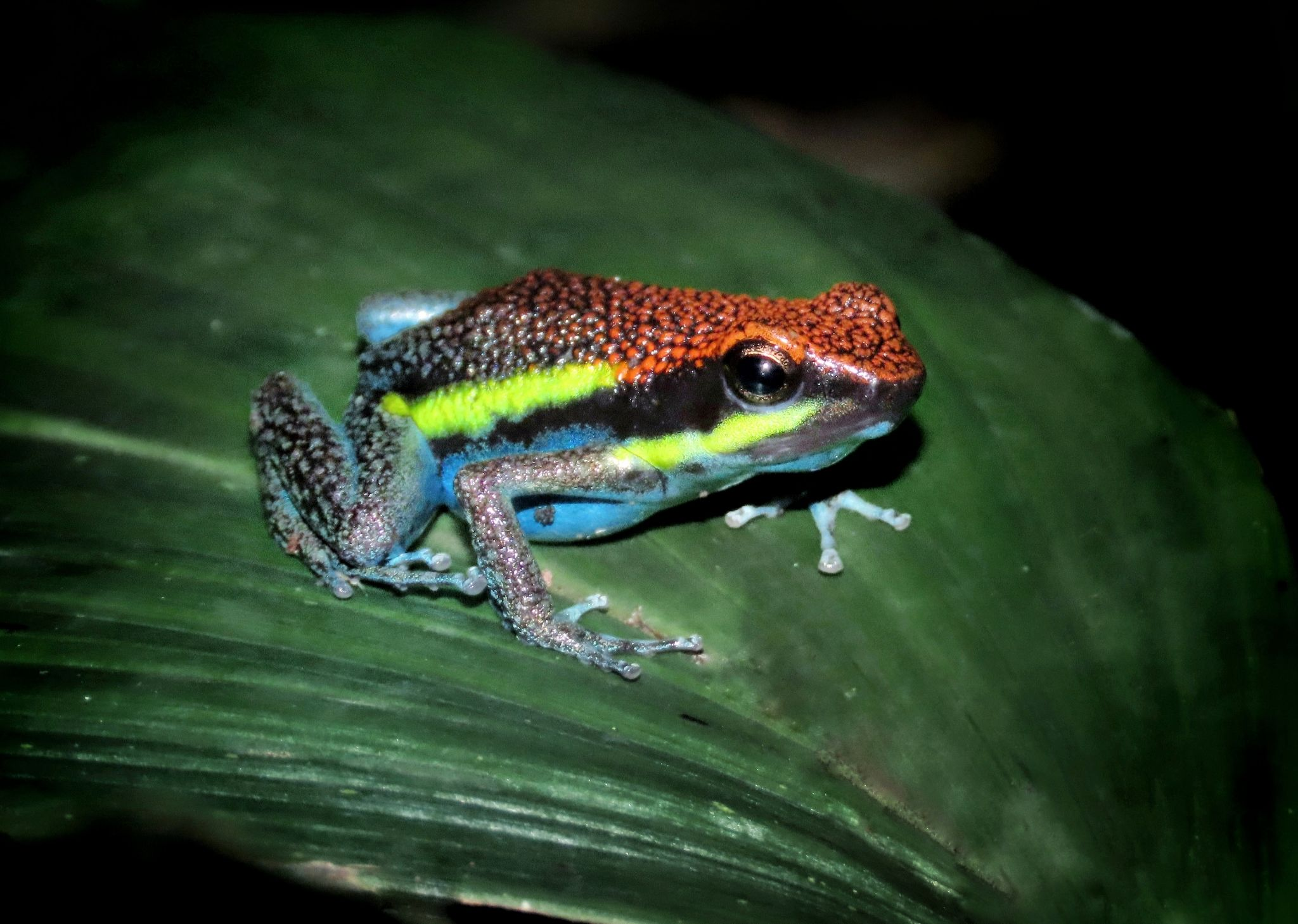

Conservation status
- Least Concern (IUCN 3.1)

Scientific classification
- Kingdom: Animalia
- Phylum: Chordata
- Class: Amphibia
- Order: Anura
- Family: Dendrobatidae
- Genus: Ameerega
- Species: A. macero

Binomial name
- Ameerega macero (Rodríguez & Myers, 1993)

Synonyms
- Epipedobates macero Rodríguez & Myers, 1993

= Manú poison frog =

Species of amphibian

The Manú poison frog (Ameerega macero) is a frog species in the family Dendrobatidae found in southern Peru and Brazil.

== Habitat ==
This frog can be found in the drainages of the Manú, Urubamba, Upper Purus and Ucayali Rivers. It can also be found in Serra do Divisor National Park and Alto Juruá Extractive Reserve. Its natural habitats are lowland tropical moist forests and montane forests, in particular bamboo forests, at elevations of 150–1,450 m.

== Reproduction ==
The female frog lays eggs on the ground. After the eggs hatch, the adult frog carries the tadpoles to slow-moving streams.

== Threats ==
The IUCN classifies this frog as least concern of extinction. It is locally threatened by habitat loss due to agriculture, and is illegally harvested for the pet trade.

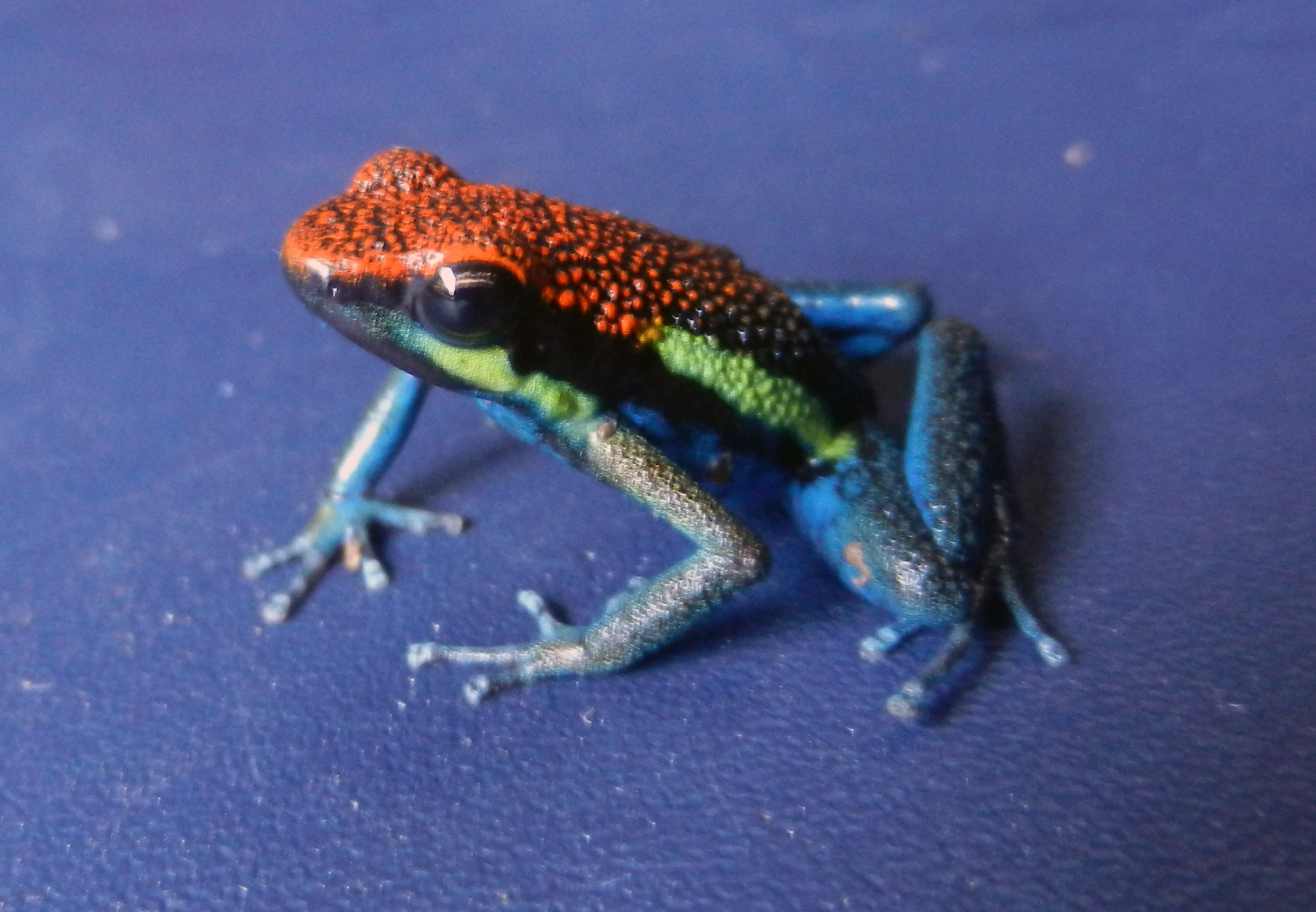
Dorsal view of a captive individual

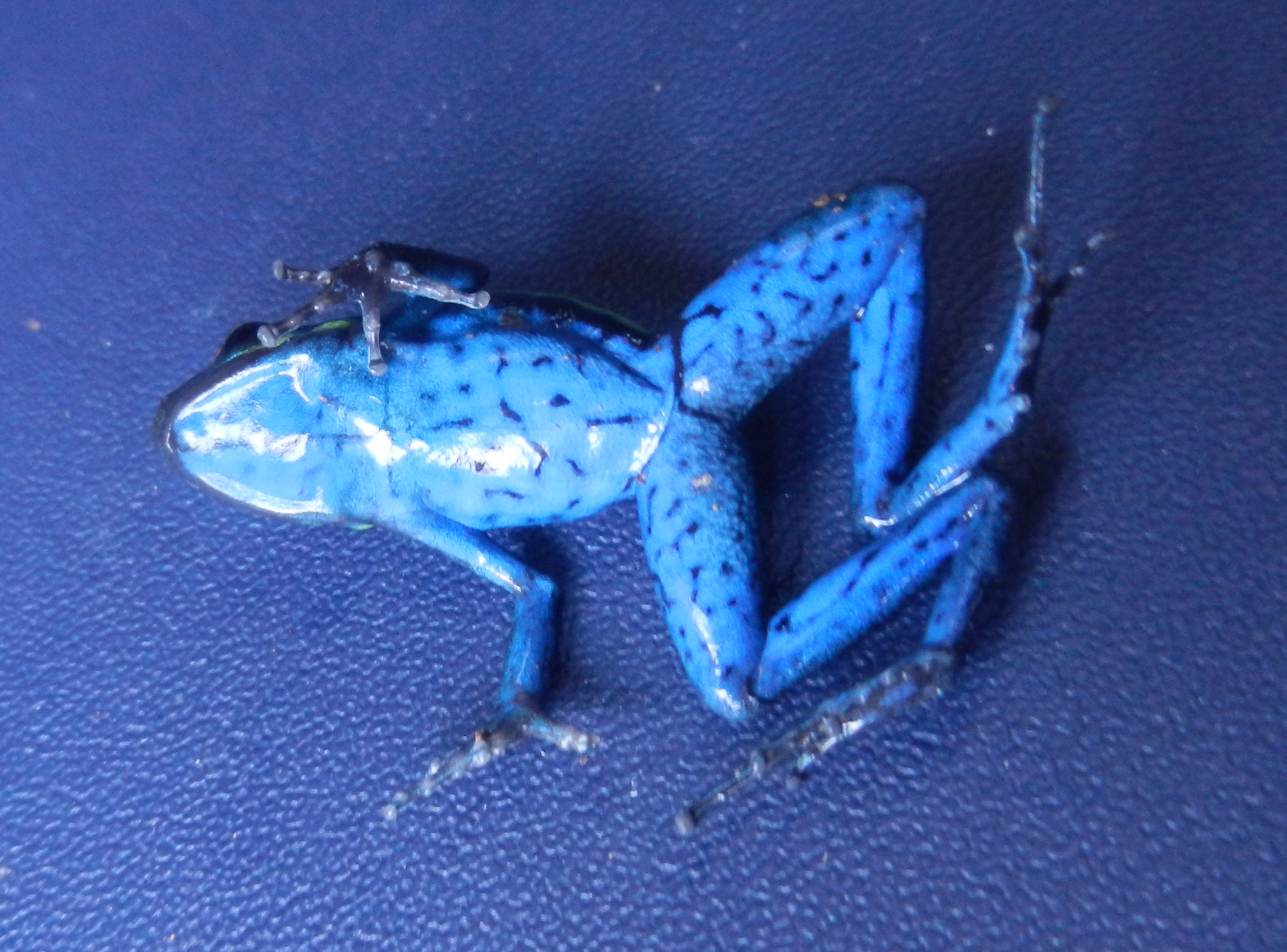
Ventral view of a captive individual
