= Rhadinoloricaria rhami =

Conservation status
- Least Concern (IUCN 3.1)

Scientific classification
- Kingdom: Animalia
- Phylum: Chordata
- Class: Actinopterygii
- Order: Siluriformes
- Family: Loricariidae
- Genus: Rhadinoloricaria
- Species: R. rhami

Binomial name
- Rhadinoloricaria rhami (Isbrücker & Nijssen, 1983)

Synonyms
- Crossoloricaria rhami Isbrücker & Nijssen, 1983

Species of fish

Rhadinoloricaria rhami is a species of freshwater ray-finned fish belonging to the family Loricariidae, the suckermouth armored catfishes, and the subfamily Loricariinae, the mailed catfishes. This catfish is found in the Urubamba and Ucayali River basins in Peru; the Amazon basin of Colombia and Madre de Dios-Beni-Orthon basin in Bolivia, it has also been found in the Yuruá River in southeastern Peru. This species grows to a standard length of 12.7 cm (5.0 in) .

== Etymology ==
Rhadinoloricaria rhami has a specific name which honors the Swiss ichthyologist and aquarist Patrick de Rham, who was the leader of the expedition on which the Isbrucker and Nijssen collected the type series, in which de Rham assisted.
