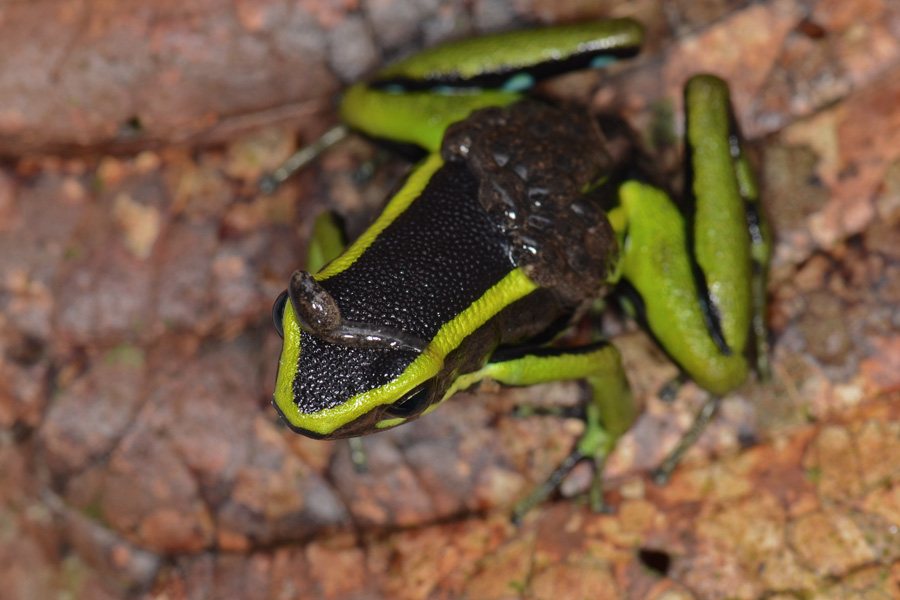

Conservation status
- Least Concern (IUCN 3.1)

Scientific classification
- Kingdom: Animalia
- Phylum: Chordata
- Class: Amphibia
- Order: Anura
- Family: Dendrobatidae
- Genus: Ameerega
- Species: A. trivittata

Binomial name
- Ameerega trivittata (Spix, 1824)

Synonyms
- Epipedobates trivittatus

= Ameerega trivittata =

Species of amphibian

Ameerega trivittata, formerly Epipedobates trivittatus, is a species of frog in the family Dendrobatidae commonly known as the three-striped poison frog. It is found in Bolivia, Brazil, Colombia, Guyana, Peru, Suriname, Venezuela, possibly Ecuador, and possibly French Guiana.

Its natural habitats are subtropical or tropical moist lowland forest floors and intermittent freshwater marshes. A. trivittata is diurnal and terrestrial. Its distinctive features include its large size (up to 50 mm), granular skin, lack of webbing between digits, and distinctive striped markings. The colour of these markings varies; typically the stripes are green, but yellow and orange specimens occur, as well. It lays terrestrial eggs, which are hidden in clutches under leaves. The males take care of the eggs and carry the tadpoles on their backs to pools once they have hatched. The species is currently threatened by habitat loss.

== Description ==
The male three-striped poison frog has a snout–vent length of about 42 mm (1.65 in) and the female reaches about 55 mm (2.17 in). It has a slightly protruding snout with no teeth, finely granulated skin on its dorsal surface and smooth skin on its flanks and ventral surface. The digits are unwebbed and the first finger is longer than the second finger. The colouring of this species varies somewhat between locations but in general it has a black back and sides, a black belly suffused blue posteriorly and yellowish-green or light-brown limbs. Two yellowish-green lateral stripes run from the snout to the hind legs.

== Biology ==
The three-striped poison frog is a diurnal, terrestrial species that is found among the leaf litter of the forest floor in both primary and secondary tropical forests. The main food of this frog is ants which are plentiful on the forest floor. Males are territorial during the breeding season but females are not. The eggs are laid in small clutches underneath fallen leaves during the rainy season. They take about 15 days to hatch during which time the male guards them. He then carries them to a suitable ephemeral pool or water-filled crevice where the tadpoles develop for from 41 to 54 days before undergoing metamorphosis.
