= Rhadinoloricaria stewarti =

Scientific classification
- Kingdom: Animalia
- Phylum: Chordata
- Class: Actinopterygii
- Order: Siluriformes
- Family: Loricariidae
- Genus: Rhadinoloricaria
- Species: R. stewarti

Binomial name
- Rhadinoloricaria stewarti Provenzano & Barriga Salazar, 2020

Species of catfish

Rhadinoloricaria stewarti s a species of freshwater ray-finned fish belonging to the family Loricariidae, the suckermouth armored catfishes, and the subfamily Loricariinae, the mailed catfishes. This catfish is found in South America, where it occurs in the drainage basin of the Cononaco River, a tributary of the Napo River, in Ecuador. The species was described in 2020 as part of a redescription of the genus Rhadinoloricaria conducted by Francisco Provenzano (of the Central University of Venezuela) and Ramiro Barriga-Salazar. This species grows to a standard length of 12.51 cm (4.93 in).

== Etymology ==
Rhadinoloricaria stewart has a specific name which honors the American ichthyologist Donald J. Stewart, of the State University of New York College of Environmental Science and Forestry, for his work on freshwater fishes, particularly the fish fauna of the Napo River.
