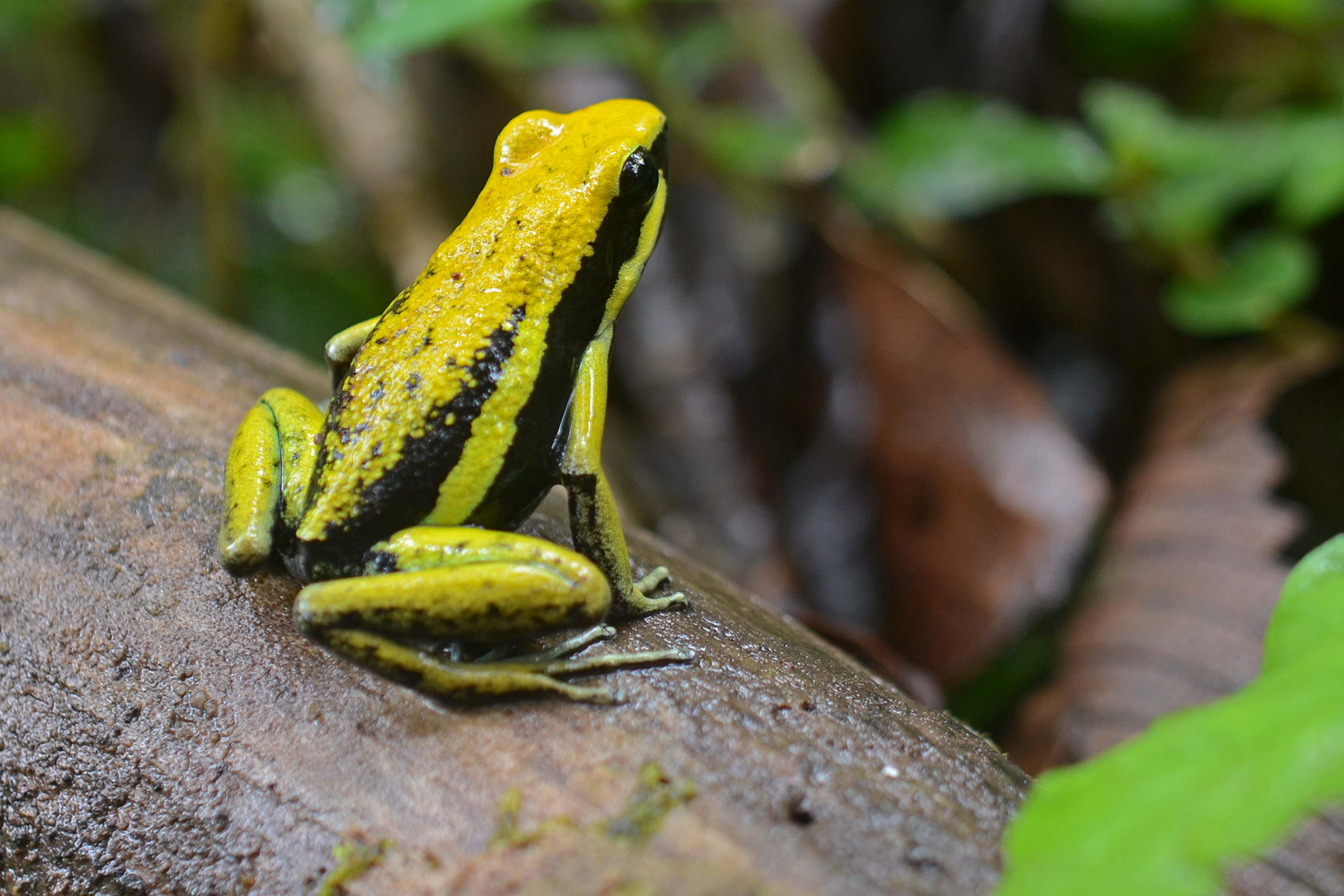

Conservation status
- Vulnerable (IUCN 3.1)

Scientific classification
- Kingdom: Animalia
- Phylum: Chordata
- Class: Amphibia
- Order: Anura
- Family: Dendrobatidae
- Genus: Ameerega
- Species: A. bassleri

Binomial name
- Ameerega bassleri (Melin, 1941)

Synonyms
- Dendrobates bassleri Melin, 1941; Phyllobates bassleri (Melin, 1941); Epipedobates bassleri (Melin, 1941); Phobobates bassleri (Melin, 1941)

= Pleasing poison frog =

Species of amphibian

The pleasing poison frog (Ameerega bassleri) is a species of frog in the family Dendrobatidae endemic to Peru. The specific name bassleri honors Harvey Bassler, an American geologist and paleontologist.

== Distribution and habitat ==
The species is found in lowland and montane tropical moist forests, in both pristine and slightly degraded habitat, in the Amazon drainage of Peru at elevations of 270–1,200 m. This frog is commonly found no more than 300 m from streams. At lower elevations, it seems to limited to moist microhabitats near streams at the bases of mountains, it seems to be less specific at higher elevations.

The frog's known range includes at least two protected parks: Parque Nacional Cordillera Azul and Parque Nacional Cordillera Esclera. Scientists believe it could also live in Bosque de Protección Alto Mayo.

== Conservation ==
Although it can be extremely common in places, the pleasing poison frog is currently classified as Vulnerable by the IUCN due to ongoing habitat loss, mostly caused by farming and ranching.

While this frog is seen on the international pet trade, scientists do not believe this is a threat to the species overall. Captive breeding for the pet trade is legal. However, they note it would be very easy to overharvest specific color morphs if people were to capture them in the wild.
