= Purma =

A purma is a type of early successional forest, or secondary forest, in the Amazon Basin.

In the Amazon, people convert forest to farms and plantations called chacras. If that farm should be abandoned, the local plants begin to recolonize the area. It is then called a purma.
