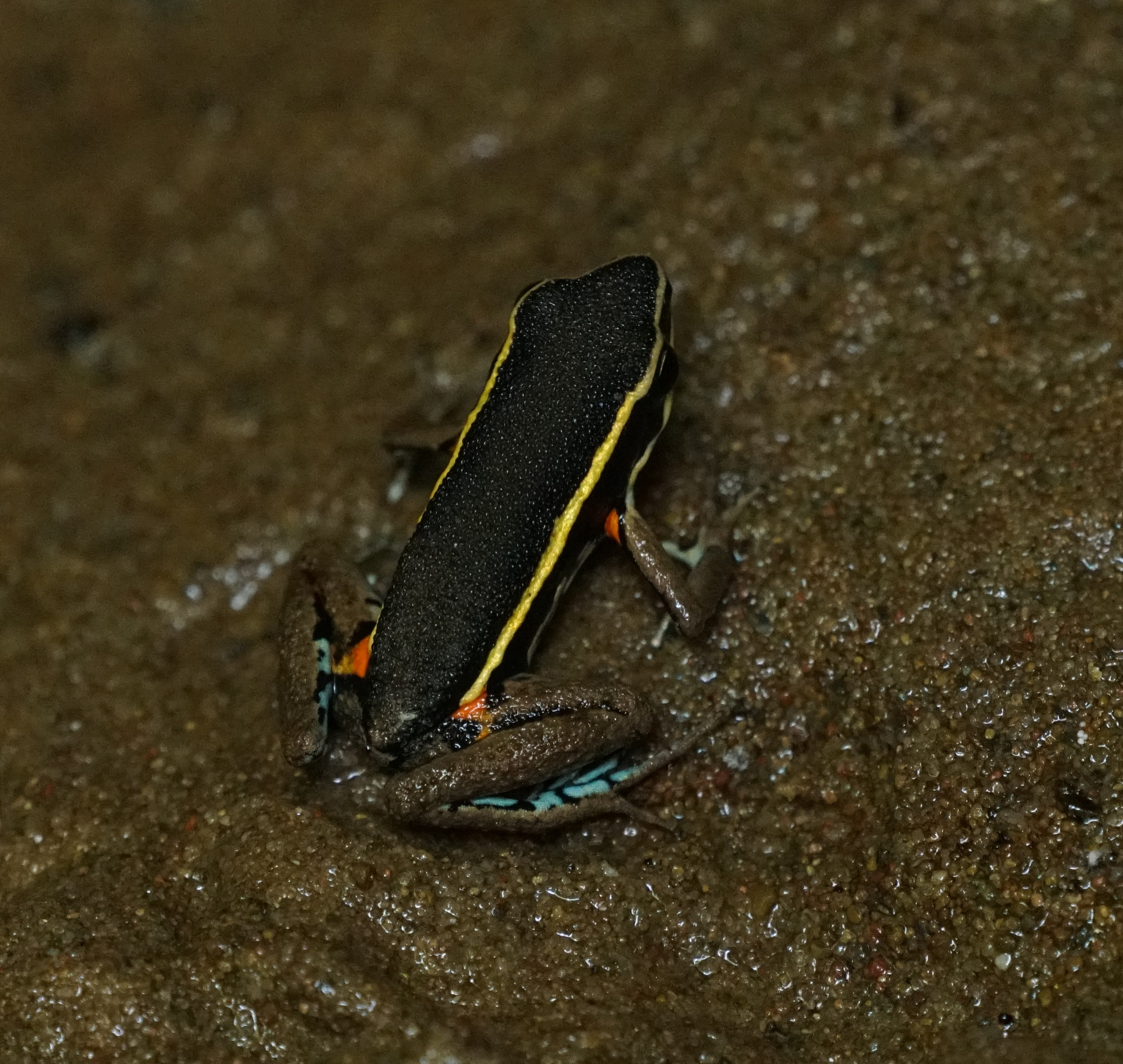

Conservation status
- Least Concern (IUCN 3.1)

Scientific classification
- Kingdom: Animalia
- Phylum: Chordata
- Class: Amphibia
- Order: Anura
- Family: Dendrobatidae
- Genus: Ameerega
- Species: A. picta

Binomial name
- Ameerega picta (Tschudi, 1838)

Synonyms
- Hylaplesia picta Tschudi, 1838; Dendrobates pictus Duméril and Bibron, 1841; Dendrobates eucnemis Steindachner, 1864; Dendrobates pictus pictus Lutz, 1952; Dendrobates pictus eucnemis Lutz, 1952; Dendrobates pictus guayanensis Heatwole, Solano, and Heatwole, 1965; Phyllobates pictus Silverstone, 1975; Dendrobates pictus Myers, Daly, and Malkin, 1978; Epipedobates pictus Myers, 1987; Epipedobates guayanensis Barrio-Amorós, 2004; Epipedobates yungicola Lötters, Schmitz, and Reichle, 2005; Ameerega yungicola Frost, 2006; Ameerega picta Frost, Grant, Faivovich, Bain, Haas, Haddad, de Sá, Channing, Wilkinson, Donnellan, Raxworthy, Campbell, Blotto, Moler, Drewes, Nussbaum, Lynch, Green, and Wheeler, 2006

= Spot-legged poison frog =

Species of amphibian

The spot-legged poison frog (Ameerega picta; formerly Epipedobates picta) is a species of dendrobatid frog found in Bolivia, Brazil, Peru, and Venezuela.

== Home ==
This frog has been observed on dead branches and leaf litter in primary and secondary tropical lowland and montane forests. It has also been observed at the edges of forests and in degraded habitats. Scientists observed the frog between 200 and 2500 meters above sea level. Its range includes many protected areas.

== Reproduction ==
The female frog lays her eggs on the ground. After the eggs hatch, the adult frogs carry the tadpoles to water.

== Threats ==
The IUCN classifies this frog as least concern of extinction because its large range contains considerable suitable habitat. There are some localized threats associated with farming and livestock cultivation. It is possible that this frog may be sold on the international pet trade, but it is not clear that this poses a threat to the wild population.

== Original publication ==
- Avila-Pires, T. C.; Hoogmoed, M.; Rocha, W. (January–April 2010). "Notas sobre os vertebrados do norte do Pará, Brasil: uma parte esquecida da Região das Guianas, I. Herpetofauna" [Notes on the Vertebrates of northern Pará, Brazil: a forgotten part of the Guianan Region, I. Herpetofauna]. Boletim do Museu Paraense Emílio Goeldi. Ciências Naturais. 5 (1): 13–112. doi:10.46357/bcnaturais.v5i1.647. pp. 65–66: "Lötters et al. (2007) reporting E. cf. guayanensis (as Ameerega pictus guayanensis) from Venezuela and Guyana, reached the same conclusions as we do, and suggested that this may be a good species. We can not yet eliminate the possibility we are dealing with a new species here, and further study is needed to provide a decisive answer."
