= Cordillera Azul National Park =

Protected area in Peru

- IUCN category II (national park)
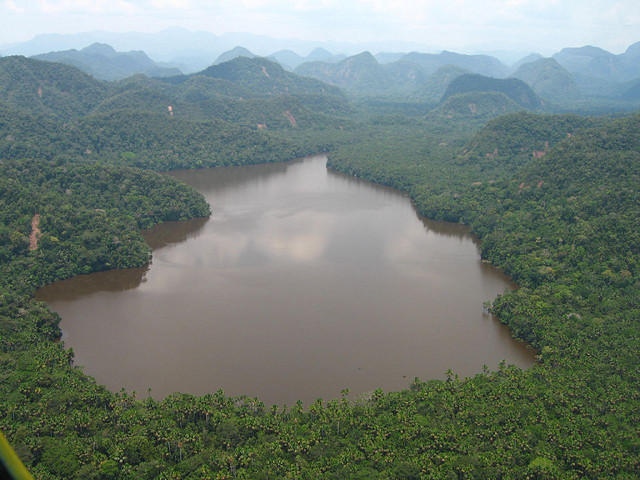
- Lake at Cordillera Azul National Park

- Location within Peru
- Location: Peru; Loreto, San Martín, Huánuco and Ucayali
- Nearest city: Tarapoto
- Coordinates: 7.75°S 75.94°W
- Area: 1,353,190 hectares (5,224.7 sq mi)
- Established: May 21, 2001
- Governing body: SERNANP
- Website: Parque Nacional Cordillera Azul

Cordillera Azul National Park (Spanish: Parque Nacional Cordillera Azul) is a protected area in Peru. It protects part of the Ucayali moist forests ecoregion.

== History ==
In 1963, the Biavo-Cordillera Azul National Forest was established, spanning 2,178,000 hectares. In 1997, this area was declared as a forest for timber production, leaving it open to logging operations. However, in 1999, Red Ambiental Peruana (an alliance of several NGOs) and COPRI (the authority for rights for timber exploitation) conducted research in the area and agreed to protect the northern part of the forest due to its high biodiversity. In 2000, the Cordillera Azul Reserved Zone was established in the mountainous region of the national forest, and a team from the Field Museum carried out an assessment of the biodiversity in the area. Based on this assessment, the Peruvian Ministry of Agriculture recommended that the area be protected as a national park. The Cordillera Azul National Park was established in 2001 during the tenure of president Valentín Paniagua.

== Geography ==
Cordillera Azul National Park is located in the regions of San Martin, Loreto, Huanuco and Ucayali; between the Huallaga and Ucayali rivers. Elevations in the park are in the range of 100–2350 m, and the main landscape features are: mountains, hills and ample valleys. Mountains inside the park can have steep slopes, and landslides are frequent. In the southern section of the park, there is an area of highland swamps, at 1400 m of elevation. At the northern end of the park, the Huallaga river opens a water gap in the mountain range, east of Chazuta, this feature is known as Pongo de Aguirre.

== Ecology ==
=== Flora ===
Montane forests cover most of the park's area, although it also includes sections of dry forest to the west and lowland Amazon rainforest to the east. Among the plant species found in the area are: Ceiba insignis, Ficus spp., Tabernaemontana sananho, Inga spp., Swietenia macrophylla, Triplaris americana, Miconia spp., Couroupita guianensis, Ocotea javitensis, Sciodaphyllum spp., Erythrina ulei, Alchornea triplinervia, Terminalia amazonia, Calophyllum brasiliense, Pouteria spp., Cedrela fissilis, Epidendrum spp., Schizolobium parahyba, Bactris gasipaes, Cecropia spp., Hevea guianensis, Dracontium spruceanum, Attalea maripa, Brosimum alicastrum, Asplenium serratum, Heliconia rostrata, Carludovica palmata, Solanum grandiflorum, Geogenanthus poeppigii, Myroxylon balsamum, Brunfelsia grandiflora, Calycophyllum spruceanum, Mauritia flexuosa, Virola calophylla, Desmoncus polyacanthos, Podocarpus oleifolius, Theobroma cacao, Cedrelinga cateniformis, Zamia poeppigiana, Amburana cearensis, Margaritaria nobilis, Jacaranda copaia, Eugenia spp., Spondias mombin, Maxillaria graminifolia, etc.

=== Fauna ===
Among the fish found in the park are: Hoplias malabaricus, Rineloricaria lanceolata, Leporinus spp., Piaractus brachypomus, Pseudoplatystoma fasciatum, Zungaro zungaro, Crossoloricaria rhami, etc.

Some of the birds found in the park are: the great tinamou, the fasciated tiger heron, the scarlet macaw, the osprey, the muscovy duck, the violet-headed hummingbird, the sunbittern, the short-tailed parrot, the white-booted racket-tail, the king vulture, the little blue heron, the harpy eagle, the jabiru, the blue-and-yellow macaw, the fork-tailed palm swift, the Cordillera Azul antbird, etc.

Mammals reported in the area include: the Amazon dwarf squirrel, the bush dog, the puma, the common opossum, the brown-mantled tamarin, the Peruvian spider monkey, the jaguar, the white-lipped peccary, the red brocket, the South American tapir, the tayra, etc.

== Environmental issues ==
Illegal road building and clearing of forests for agriculture occurs inside the park; park rangers and inhabitants of nearby villages patrol the area.
