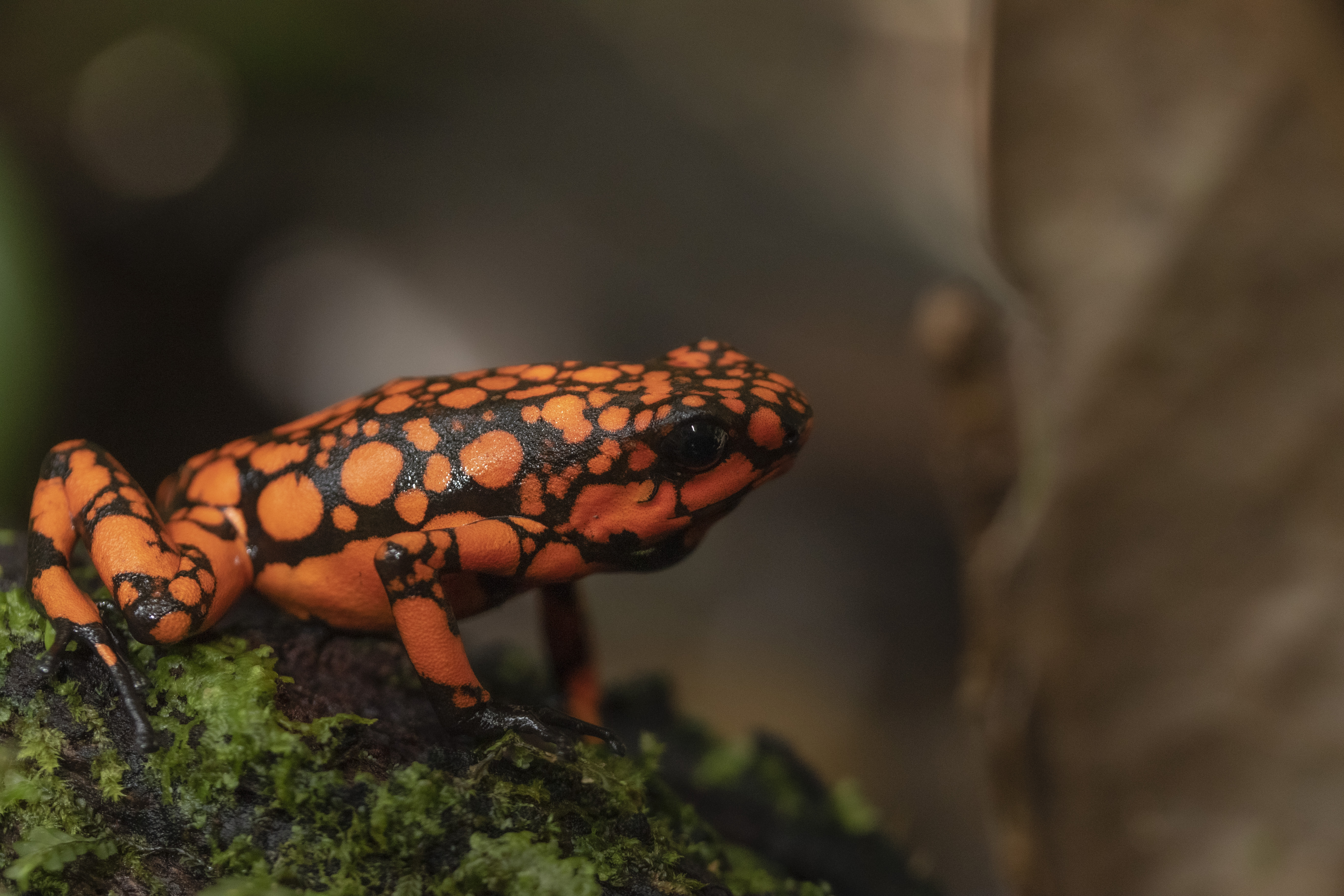

Conservation status
- Vulnerable (IUCN 3.1)
- CITES Appendix II

Scientific classification
- Kingdom: Animalia
- Phylum: Chordata
- Class: Amphibia
- Order: Anura
- Family: Dendrobatidae
- Genus: Oophaga
- Species: O. solanensis

Binomial name
- Oophaga solanensis Posso-Terranova & Andrés, 2018

= Oophaga solanensis =

Species of frog

Oophaga solanensis, also known as the koe-koe, is a species of poison dart frog in the family Dendrobatidae. It was described by the herpetologists Andrés Posso-Terranova and Jose Andrés in 2018 and is named for the municipality of Bahía Solano, where it was first discovered. It is a large poison dart frog with an average snout–vent length of 36.2 ± 1.7 mm (1.425 ± 0.067 in). It has a dark black background color marked with variable orange or red spots and "bracelet"-like patterns on the limbs. Typically, there are four to five rounded or oval spots arranged in a line along the middle of the back, one or two spots on the sides, and sometimes another spot around the tympanum. There are bracelet-like bands on the upper and lower limbs, usually incomplete on the underside. The throat and chest have several spots. The fingers and toe tips are black and the skin is smooth.

The species is endemic to northwestern Colombia, where it is known from the western banks of the Atrato and San Juan rivers to the Pacific coast. It inhabits dense tropical rainforest throughout its range at elevations of 0 to 420 m (0 to 1,378 ft). Oophaga solanensis is classified as being vulnerable on the IUCN Red List due to its small range and an ongoing decline in its population due to wildlife trafficking and habitat degradation. The species' habitat was historically inaccessible and protected due to the Colombian conflict, but the end of the conflict has increased the species' vulnerability to trafficking and habitat loss. Measures that have been suggested to protect the species include adding the species to Appendix I of CITES, establishing ex situ populations, additional research on threats and distribution, and better regulation of trade of the species.

== Taxonomy ==
Oophaga solanensis was described by the herpetologists Andrés Posso-Terranova and Jose Andrés in 2018 on the basis of an adult male specimen collected from a delta of the Baudó River near Bajo Baudó in the Chocó Department of Colombia. It is named for the historically Afro-Colombian municipality of Bahía Solano, where the first population of the species was found.

The frog is one of 12 species currently recognised within Oophaga, a genus of poison dart frogs native to Central and South America. Before the publication of the 2018 paper describing the species, populations of O. solanensis, O. andresi, and O. anchicayensis were thought to represent a lineage of the O. histrionica species complex. O. solanensis was recognized as a new species after a study of mitochondrial DNA, appearance, and ecology in the complex found significant morphological and phylogenetic differences between O. solanensis and the other species. Within the genus, it forms a species group with O. histrionica, O. andresi, and O. anchicayensis.

== Description ==
Oophaga solanensis is a large poison dart frog, with an average snout–vent length of 36.2 ± 1.7 mm (1.425 ± 0.067 in), although individuals can vary in length from 33 to 55 mm (1.3 to 2.2 in). O. solanensis have a dark black background color marked with variable orange or red spots and limb bracelets. In the typical color pattern, there are four to five rounded or oval spots arranged in a line along the middle of the back. The sides will have one or two spots, with another spot sometimes present around the tympanum (external eardrum). There are bracelet-like bands on the upper and lower limbs, usually incomplete on the underside. The throat and chest have several spots. The fingers and toe tips are black and the skin is smooth. In the northern part of its range, O. solanensis have many spots on the back besides those in the medial line, as well as larger mottled spots on the underside.

The species can be identified as a member of its genus based on its medium to large size, the lack of sexual dimorphism, the contrasting bright spots on the solidly dark background, the absence of the omosternum, the relatively large discs on second, third, and fourth fingers, the absence of the maxillary and premaxillary teeth, the presence of the tarsal tubercle, and the secretion of alkaloids from its skin. Within its genus, it is placed in the histrionicus-lehmanni-occultator group based on its medium to large body size, the absence of the omosternum, the spotted or banded back, and its range being on the Pacific slope of Colombia and northwestern Ecuador.

Oophaga solanensis can be told apart from other similar species in its genus by a combination of its color and size. O. andresi differs in its light to dark brown background color, fingers, and toe tips and comparatively smaller size. O. histrionica also has a light to dark brown background color, fingers, and toe tips and is much smaller than O. solanensis. O. lehmanni has white fingers and toe tips, while O. occultator is much smaller. O. anchicayensis is larger, has a yellow to pale green coloration, bracelet-like patterns on the back, and does not co-occur with O. solanensis.

== Distribution and habitat ==
The species is endemic to northwestern Colombia, where it is known from an area of 16,621 km^{2} (6,417 sq mi) from the western banks of the Atrato and San Juan rivers to the Pacific coast. The Atrato and San Juan Rivers are likely a geographic barrier between O. solanensis and O. andresi. It is distributed widely throughout the department of Chocó, with populations of the frog being known from near Bajo Baudó, Mecana, Bahía Solano, Serranía del Baudo, La Victoria, El Salero, Nuquí, and Quebrada Docordo. It may occur south to the western San Juan River, but is unlikely to occur south of the Calima River in Valle del Cauca Department.

Like other Oophaga frogs, O. solanensis inhabits dense tropical rainforest throughout its range at elevations of 0 to 420 m (0 to 1,378 ft), with an average temperature of 25.9 °C (78.6 °F) and an average annual precipitation of 6,279 mm (247.2 in).

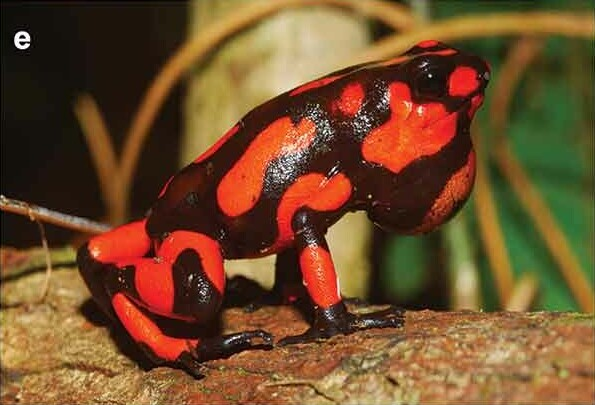
Oophaga solanensis vocalizing

== Ecology ==
Oophaga solanensis is an aggressively territorial frog, like all other South American Oophaga. Males defend territories and attract females by vocalizing from elevated perches such as branches and logs up to 4 m (13 ft) high. Vocalizing takes place throughout the day, but is especially high from 7:00–10:00 and from 13:00–14:30. They have a "chirp" call type. Females lay their eggs in male territories; after hatching, the parents move tadpoles into phytotelmata in bromeliads and feed them unfertilized eggs. Adults forage for ants and termites on the ground from sunrise to 16:00, after which they hide under leaf litter on the ground or on logs. Nights are spent resting on leaves and tree trunks.

== Status ==
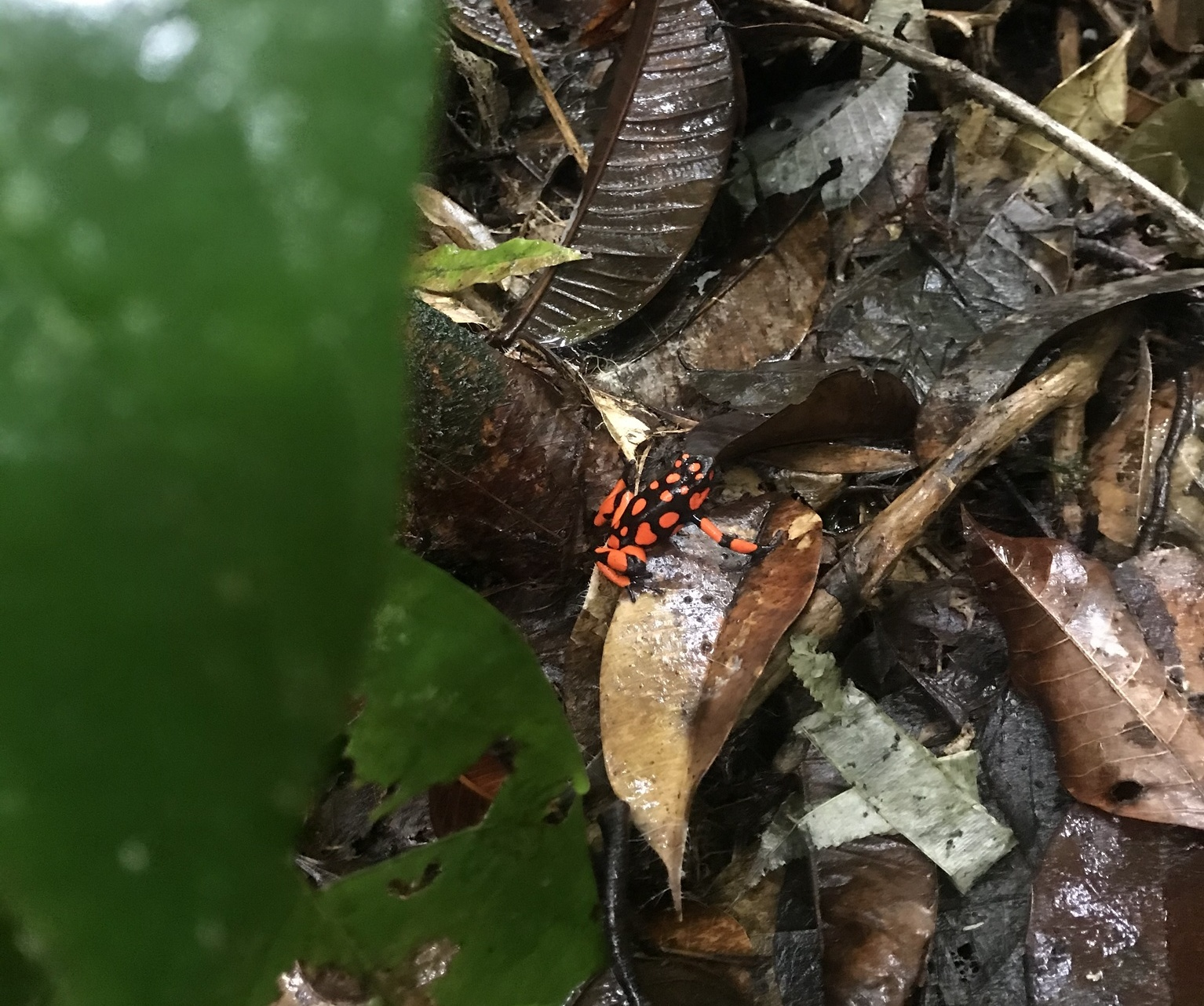
Oophaga solanensis often hide under leaf litter on the ground.

Oophaga solanensis is classified as being vulnerable on the IUCN Red List due to its small range and an ongoing decline in its population due to wildlife trafficking and habitat degradation. Historically, the forests that this species inhabited were inaccessible due to the Colombian conflict, which acted as a buffer protecting the species. The end of the conflict between the Colombian government and guerrillas has increased the species' vulnerability to trafficking and habitat loss caused by agriculture and extractive industries. Tropical rainforest in the species' range is still relatively well-preserved, but it faces several threats. Populations of the species are very dense, and entire subpopulations are vulnerable to being wiped out by a single threat. Gold mining along the Quito River has caused deforestation and water contamination, selective logging and illegal agriculture are increasing in the species' range, and large-scale use of agrochemicals and glyphosate fumigations in the region are known to have caused large declines in population.

Wildlife trafficking also threatens O. solanensis, with individuals of the species being highly valued in the illegal trade. Frogs are bought from locals for prices around US$3 per frog and subsequently sold for up to US$1,000 per frog in Europe and North America. Oophaga frogs are hard to breed in captivity and are frequently collected from the wild, with one bust at the Bogotá airport in 2018 finding 216 Oophaga frogs being trafficked, including individuals of O. solanensis. The species has not been recorded in any protected areas, but may occur in Parque Nacional Utria. The species is listed on Appendix II of CITES and is protected by Decree INDERENA No. 39, which makes collecting the species from the wild illegal. Further measures that have been suggested to protect the species include adding the species to Appendix I of CITES, establishing ex situ populations, conducting additional research on threats and distribution, and better regulating the trade in the species.
