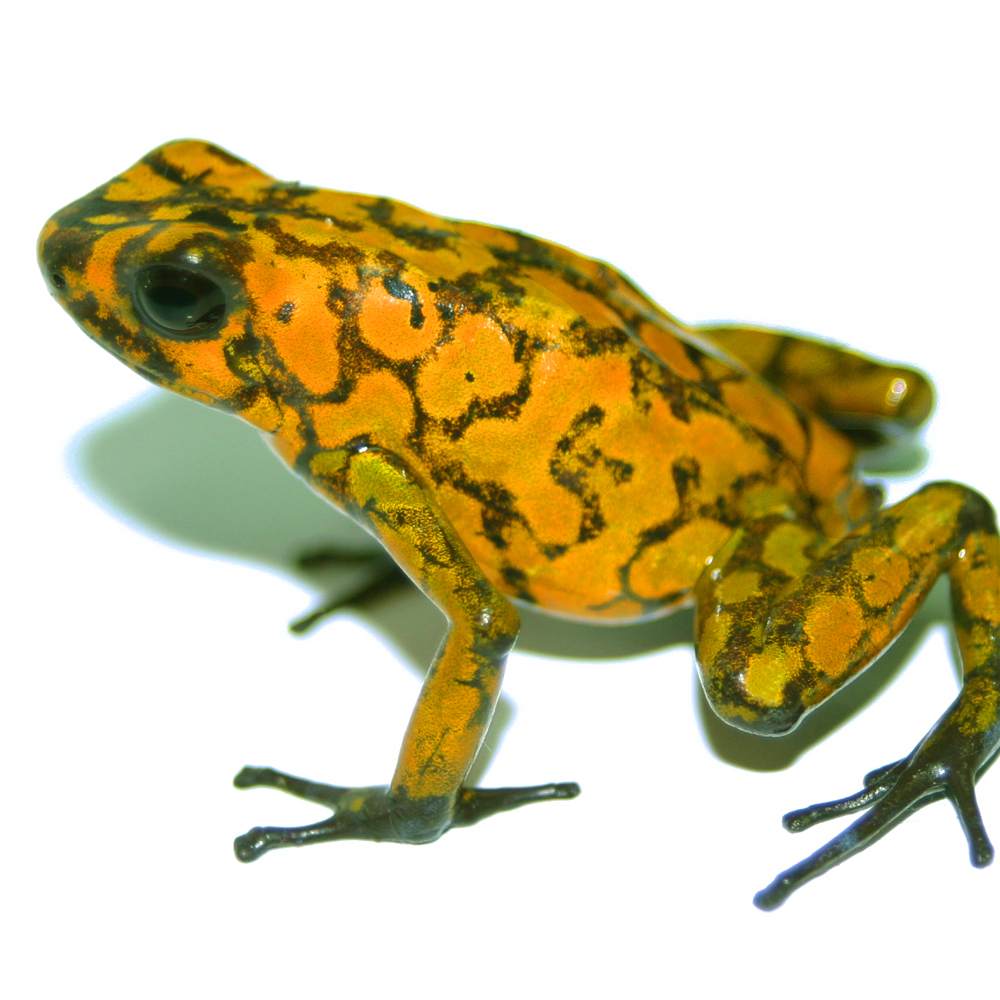

Conservation status
- Near Threatened (IUCN 3.1)

Scientific classification
- Kingdom: Animalia
- Phylum: Chordata
- Class: Amphibia
- Order: Anura
- Family: Dendrobatidae
- Genus: Oophaga
- Species: O. sylvatica

Binomial name
- Oophaga sylvatica (Funkhouser, 1956)

Synonyms
- Dendrobates histrionicus sylvaticus Funkhouser, 1956; Dendrobates sylvaticus Funkhouser, 1956

= Oophaga sylvatica =

Species of amphibian

Oophaga sylvatica, the kiki poison dart frog or little devil frog, it is also sometimes known as its Spanish name diablito, is a species of frog in the family Dendrobatidae found in Southwestern Colombia and Northwestern Ecuador. Its natural habitat is lowland and submontane rainforest; it can, however, survive in moderately degraded areas, at least in the more humid parts of its range. It is a very common frog in Colombia, but has disappeared from much of its Ecuadorian range. It is threatened by habitat loss (deforestation) and agricultural pollution and sometimes seen in the international pet trade.

This species occurs in several color morphs. For example, the Bilsa Biological Station (operated by the Jatun Sacha Foundation) boasts three color morphs—red, yellow, and orange—within their 3000-ha protected area located within Ecuador's Mache and Chindul coastal mountain ranges.

== Description ==
Oophaga sylvatica only displays sexual dimorphism in body size, as both males and females typically have a snout-vent length of 26 – 38 mm, with the males being only slightly larger on average than females. Amongst other closely related species, they are the largest. These species sport aposematic coloration, exhibiting both polytypic and polymorphic variation. Aposematic coloration serves as a visual warning to potential predators that the species is unpalatable which they will soon realize after making the mistake of trying to attack an Oophaga sylvatica. While the patterning of color varies widely, the colors themselves reliably exhibit chromatic and achromatic contrast. The colors also typically are of a bright and exotic nature that is typically synonymous with toxic and poisonous species. This wide range of pattern variation suggests roughly equal fitness for such variation. The range of colors that O. sylvatica displays is also considerably constrained to varying shades of orange, black, and other similar colors. Such coloration allows them to blend in with the mottled forest floor, where they are typically found. Their skin is smooth, with no webbing between any of their toes.

== Population structure, speciation, and phylogeny ==
Oophaga sylvatica is a species in the family Dendrobatidae, commonly known as poison-dart frogs, which are characterized by their bright coloration and the toxic alkaloids found in their skin. The phenotypic diversity in coloration observed in this species has been attributed to sexual and natural selection rather than genetic drift. These frogs are diurnal and exhibit terrestrial egg-laying, as well as parental care behaviors towards eggs and tadpoles.

Also known as Dendrobates sylvaticus, the phylogenetic relationship for this species has been modified a couple of times, with most hypothetical models suggesting its closest relatives to be O. pumilio, O. arborea, O. speciosa, and O. granulifera.

While sometimes the Oophaga sylvatica species is considered to be a complex species due to its high levels of morphological variation, genetic studies suggest different populations of Oophaga sylvatica are in fact only a single species. In populations in northwestern Ecuador, O. sylvatica was found to follow two main genetic lineages, separated by the Santiago River into northern and southern groups. The northern groups consist of San Antonio, Lita, Alto Tambo, Durango, and Otokiki. These populations were distributed within a fairly close proximity to each other and those with overlapping regions often displayed a mix of the two population phenotypes. The southern populations consist of Felfa, Cristóbal Colón, Simón Bolívar, Quingüe, Cube, Puerto Quito, Santo Domingo, and La Maná. Located geographically in between the northern and southern populations in the Mache-Chindul protected area is the Mediana population. Compared to the northern populations, the southern populations were found to be geographically distant. Both groups had significantly variable color diversity.

=== Genetics ===
Similar to their geographical distribution, the northern and southern populations are separated into two distinct mitochondrial clades, then further categorized into three genetic clusters: northern, southeast, and southwest. As the northern populations are closer to each other geographically, their genetic diversity is more homogeneous in comparison to the southern populations. Within-clade variation is greater than between-clades, which can be attributed to a variety of causes, including gene flow, recent separation of populations, and the number and class of genetic markers used for study.

Different O. sylvatica populations have all held relatively stable population numbers over time. Northern and southern populations likely diverged about 1.2 MYA, around the time of the Günz glaciation, which occurred roughly 1.1 MYA. Afterwards, population expansion occurred starting around the late Pleistocene which also marks the beginning of the current interglacial period, during which the northern and southern populations likely hybridized, leading to the formation of the Mediana population.

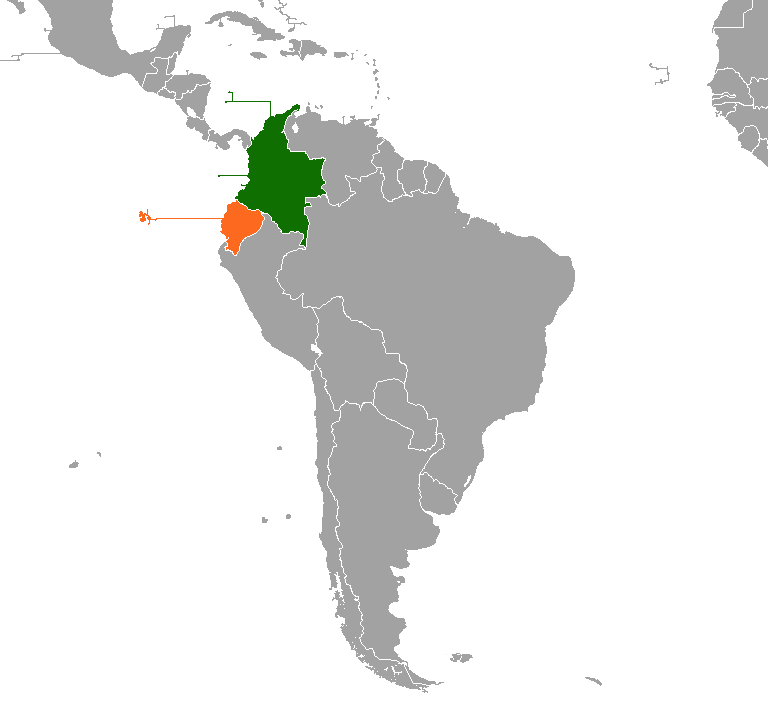
O. sylvatica is found in southwestern Colombia (green) and northwestern Ecuador (orange).

== Habitat and distribution ==
Oophaga sylvatica is natively distributed in regions of Southwestern Colombia and Northwestern Ecuador and has been reported in the provinces of Esmeraldas, Pichincha, Imbabura, Cotopaxi, Manabi, Santo Domingo de los Tsachilas, and Los Rios. It inhabits humid tropical forests in mostly lowland and sub montane rainforest. These species are found in a variety of regions and heights even up to 1000 meters above sea level. Within the Chocó rainforest in Ecuador, neotropical poison frogs including O. sylvatica are found within different types of habitats, including rivers, riparian zones, and interior forest. Rivers typically boast the highest diversity of frog species; riparian zones have unique species compositions that include rare and endangered species; interior forest is more vulnerable to logging and other anthropomorphic alterations.

=== Conservation ===
Oophaga sylvatica is able to tolerate living in some degraded regions such as plantations. This species prefers to live in the more humid parts of its habitat range. Its habitat is threatened by deforestation for anthropogenic land use, including agriculture, logging, mining, human settlements, and pollution. However, because O. sylvatica raises their young in bromeliads which are absent in secondary and road-edge habitats, this species is overwhelmingly found in primary forest. Besides its distribution being heavily biased towards primary forest, O. sylvatica is commonly observed and easy to identify, vocal during the day, and widespread in the Chocó rainforest, making it a good species indicator of habitat quality. Last assessed by the IUCN, Oophaga sylvatica was categorized as a Near Threatened species, with its population trend decreasing. It is considered of Concern and is part of Appendix II of the Convention on International Trade in Endangered Species of wild fauna and flora, or CITES.

As O. sylvatica is found throughout southwestern Colombia, a megadiverse country with accelerating deforestation, it has been included in recent conservation efforts initiated in Colombia. This effort, known as the EBC initiative (Translation from Spanish: "Binational Strategy for the Conservation and Participatory Monitoring of Threatened Species of the Key Biodiversity Areas in the Tropical Andes"), was built by the Ecological Foundation Los Colibríes de Altaquer (FELCA) with support from the Critical Ecosystem Partnership Fund (CEPF). EBC focuses on environmental education and conservation initiatives of impacted species and has created the "Festival of the Diablito Frog" to raise awareness in local communities about O. sylvatica and related conservation efforts. In collaboration with the Universidad de Nariño, FELCA, and San Francisco School students, members of the "Grupo Ecológico para la Conservación de la Rana Diablito (GERD)" project are currently designing different means of species conservation for O. sylvatica.

=== Territoriality ===
Male home ranges typically are restricted to small calling territories, whereas the home ranges of the females are much larger. The males home ranges are about 56% smaller than the home ranges of females. Male Oophaga sylvatica also typically can only climb up to 2 meters in height, whereas females can climb up to 10 meters in height. Despite the smaller home range territory and limited climbing ability, when experimentally displaced from their territories, males demonstrated better homing accuracy on average, compared to females. This may be attributed to the androgen spillover hypothesis, which dictates that higher levels of androgen are correlated with better spatial abilities. Males were found to have higher levels of androgen on average, which supports the androgen spillover hypothesis. Within their calling territories, males typically exhibit territorial and aggressive behaviors against other males of their own species. Common territorial and aggressive behaviors by Oophaga sylvatica include simultaneous calling by male conspecifics, advancing and retreating, and wrestling. When inactive, Oophaga sylvatica usually take refuge under litter or wooden logs. Similar to other frogs, O. sylvatica is not a very migration-oriented species and rather stays close in proximity to its home range.

== Diet ==
Oophaga sylvatica's diet consists primarily of leaf litter arthropods. Researchers found in an Ecuadorian sample of this species that the majority of its diet consists of ants, ranging anywhere from 40% to 86%. A total of 44 ant genera were found, from 9 subfamilies, with the Myrmicinae subfamily constituting a majority. Other insects the frog consumes include mites, springtails, and insect larvae, however these species are consumed at a much smaller abundance and the consumption of these species are dependent on the abundance present in the frog's ecosystem. The ant and mite species O. sylvatica consumes contributes to its accumulation of and variation in alkaloid toxins stored in its skin, which is used as a defense mechanism.

Deforestation can cause dietary changes in frog populations that live in deforested pastureland compared to frogs that live in the rainforest. The diet of pastureland frogs has a much smaller variety of alkaloids in it due to a reduced variety of ants, mites, and termites available to feed on compared to rainforest frogs. This translates to a reduced variety of alkaloids being sequestered in the pastureland frogs for their own defenses.

== Reproduction and life cycle ==
Oophaga sylvatica males fertilize eggs externally. Because their eggs are laid in or near shallow pools on land, this species lays fewer and larger eggs than its water-laying counterparts. Laying fewer eggs is believed to provide each egg with more resources to mature so that at the time of hatching, it has a greater chance of surviving on land, as tadpoles need water to survive. Clutch sizes typically range between 4 and 20 eggs.

=== Mating ===
Within its territory, males produce mating calls between the times of 6 AM and 7 PM. Their calls are typically short in duration and high in frequency, averaging about 5 calls per second. One study found call notes last for about 90 ms, with frequencies ranging from 800 to 3000 Hz. The most common frequencies occurred from the ranges of 1750 to 1950 Hz and 2300 to 2450 Hz. Males usually call from elevated perches to be better heard and seen when heard. A study published in 2014 suggests that because of the brightly colored aposematism frogs like O. sylvatica present, they use this protection from predators to their advantage by evolving more diverse, distinctive, and complex mating calls.

Once a female is attracted to a male's territory, they engage in a series of mating behaviors, including pursuing and circling each other, crouching, and touching. During this ritual, the male leads the female to a suitable location for laying her eggs. At the end of the mating ritual, copulation occurs without amplexus. Rather, the male deposits his sperm on the ground first, and then the female lays her eggs down after.

=== Parental care ===
Once the eggs are fertilized, the males bear the majority of the caretaking responsibility of the eggs. He typically visits the clutch several times each day and secretes fluids onto the eggs to prevent desiccation, as they are laid on land. Closer to the time of hatching, females will visit the clutch more frequently. It is essential for the parent to be present when the eggs hatch, so the tadpoles can be transported to water. Without transportation the tadpoles cannot survive, making it of the utmost importance that the parents are present when the eggs hatch. Once the eggs hatch, tadpole transport and care becomes solely the female's responsibility, without interaction or cooperation from the father. As suggested by their name, Oophaga, which translates to "egg" and "eat", tadpoles only consume the trophic eggs produced by their mother until they are old enough to go through metamorphosis. It has been suggested that the toxin's presence in oocytes serve to provide offspring with toxic defense mechanisms early on, when they are growing and still depend on their mother's trophic eggs for nourishment.

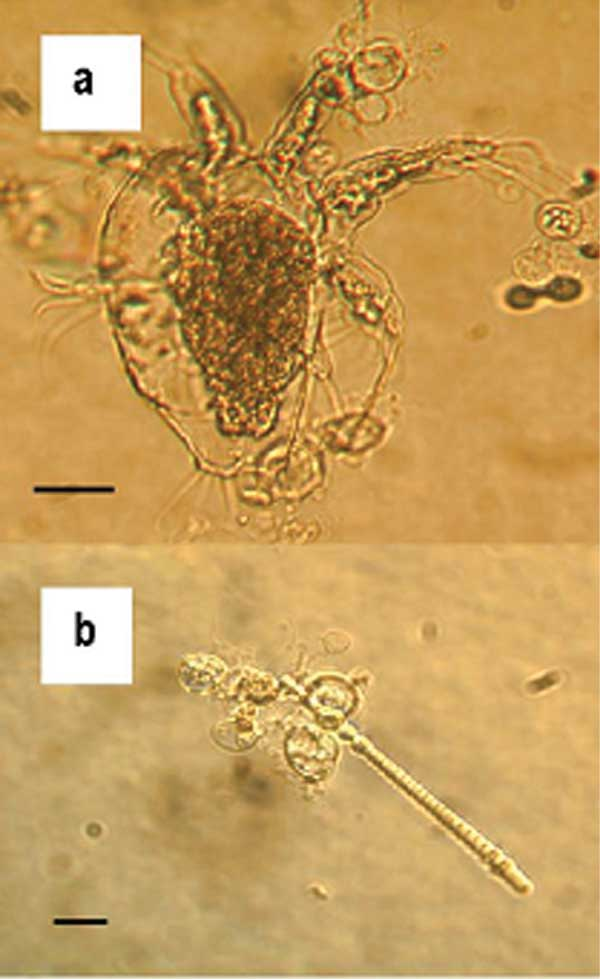
Batrachochytrium dendrobatidis, the fungus that causes the disease chytridiomycosis in amphibians

== Threats ==
Oophaga sylvatica has also been affected by the significant and global decline of amphibian populations, with leading causes due to habitat destruction and anthropomorphization, disease, pollution, and higher levels of UV radiation. Rapid population declines of O. sylvatica are largely attributed to habitat loss, disease, and the illegal pet trade. These declines have been seen across many different species of frogs and amphibians.

While the predation of O. sylvatica has not yet been explicitly studied, it is likely that they share possible predation threats with their close relatives such as Oophaga pumilio, which includes birds, reptiles, and arthropods with high-functioning visual abilities.

There has been evidence of O. sylvatica infected by chytridiomycosis, a disease caused by the fungus chytrid that infects amphibians around the world.

== Protective coloration and behavior ==
In addition to the toxicity of alkaloids on the O. sylvatica skin providing defense against predators, these same toxins cause them to give off vibrant colors. O. sylvatica displays aposematic coloration, commonly observed in neotropical poison frogs and poison dart frogs, as part of their defense mechanism. By combining bright warning coloration and toxic chemicals on their skin that render them unpalatable, these frogs make themselves memorable to predators to ward off potential future attacks. As bright and contrasting colors are typically easier to remember and memorize, common colors found in neotropical poison frogs like O. sylvatica include red, yellow and black, to ensure high luminance and hue contrast both between the different patterning on their skin and in comparison to the surrounding environment the frog is located. These colors and hues of high contrast While some populations of O. sylvatica display white coloration that is highly reflective of UV light, given the frog is probably unable to see UV-wavelength light because its close relative O. pumilio cannot, this UV reflectance is likely a byproduct of aposematic coloration and not necessarily an important part of the signal.

Histrionicotoxin.

== Physiology ==
Indolizine structural formula.

Oophaga sylvatica skin toxicity derived from an insect diet is shared amongst its phylogenetic family, as about 500 types of alkaloids have been identified from the skin extracts of various members of the Dendrobatidae family, representing over 20 distinct structural classes. Amongst the toxins found in O. sylvatica are histrionicotoxins, indolizines, lehmizidines, and decahydroquinolines. The toxins are found most abundantly in the frog's skin granular glands, liver, muscles, and oocytes.

=== Digestion ===
These insects that O. sylvatica feed on contain lipophilic alkaloid toxins, and the toxins are then absorbed by the frog and used as a defense mechanism. These frogs cannot produce the toxins by themselves thus receive them from an exogenous source or a source that is not produced within themselves. Proteomic profiling has revealed that the livers of these frogs produce high levels of specialized proteins like saxiphilin that may be involved in alkaloid sequestration. Ingesting lipophilic alkaloids causes a dramatic increase in saxiphilin expression in the skin and liver of the frog. Saxiphilin protein is likely involved in helping to transport the alkaloids from the digestive tract to the skin, where they are used in defense. O. sylvatica can sequester alkaloids in just 4 days compared to weeks in some other dendrobatid species such as the golden poison frog.

There is ongoing research investigating how O. sylvatica is able to sequester and use alkaloid toxins, as well as how its consumption of such toxins alter its molecular physiology related to metabolic functions. After ingestion, the frog's intestinal lining is designed to prevent passive absorption of toxins. Instead, as these toxins are small and lipophilic, they are transported through the blood via carrier proteins, and the lymph via chylomicrons. How exactly the toxins are able to arrive at the skin and be stored in granules is yet unknown, but researchers hypothesize this process likely involves coordination between various tissues and transport systems.

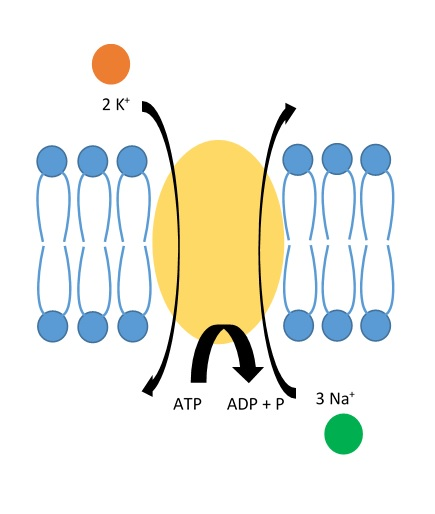
Sodium-Potassium Pump.

=== Toxins ===
While O. sylvatica harvests toxins from its diet for defensive use, its body must also strike a balance between usage and metabolism to prevent the organism from poisoning itself due to an overabundance of toxins. As such, proteomic profiling studies have found varying degrees of upregulation and downregulation of different metabolic-related proteins in these frogs, compared to non-toxic controls. Some drug-metabolizing proteins are found to be decreased, such as nicotinamide N-methyltransferase, found to detoxify xenobiotics, and cytochrome P450s, which are involved in small molecule metabolism. Meanwhile, others are increased, such as glutathione S-transferase kappa 1. There have also been a host of proteins found to be upregulated in expression that may play a role in alkaloid transport. ApoA4 is an apolipoprotein that could also function as an alkaloid transporter. The complement system is also found to be more active, especially the C3 protein, which may enhance alkaloid absorption. Parallels have been drawn with CVF, the cobra venom factor that is activated by cobra venom. Heat shock proteins were found to be upregulated in the liver, which could be used to bind decahydroquinoline, a form of alkaloid toxin, or as a response to the destabilizing ability of alkaloids on other proteins.

Alkaloids are commonly found to target voltage-gated sodium channels and nicotinamide acetylcholine receptors. It has been commonly found that frog resistance to the toxins they use for defense is linked to mutations in such ion channels. Evidence shows downregulation of various ion channels in O. sylvatica, including the amiloride-sensitive sodium channel, the sodium-potassium pump, and TRPV2, which functions to detect noxious chemicals. The sodium-potassium channel in particular has been found to contain mutations in various animals exhibiting toxin resistance.
