= Begging in animals =

Animal behavior

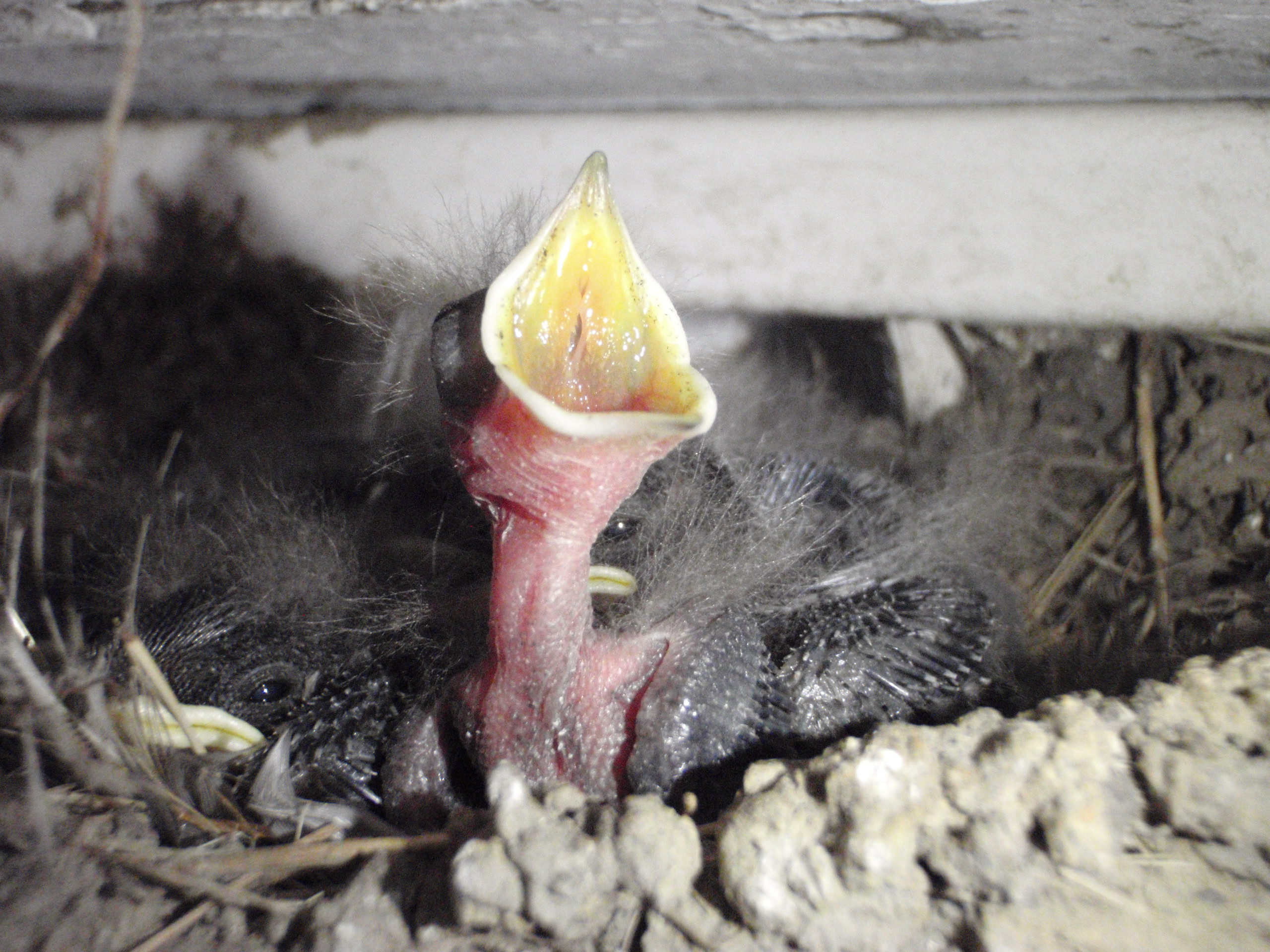
Newly hatched barn swallow begging for food

Begging in animals is when an animal solicits being given resources by another animal. This is usually a young animal soliciting food from their parents, brood hosts or other adults. However, the resource is sometimes non-food related or may be solicited by adult animals. Begging behavior is most widely studied in birds, however, mammals, amphibians, and invertebrates perform begging displays. Generally in food solicitation, begging behavior is instinctive, although in some instances it is learned (e.g. pet cats and dogs).

While the ultimate causation for begging is an increase in the animal's individual fitness, several theories have been proposed for how food begging evolved proximate causes including scramble competition, honest signalling of need, and cooperative begging by siblings. Various types of information such as nutritional status or immunocompetence can be transmitted with auditory and visual begging signals and the behavior can be modulated by several factors such as brood size and hormones. Similarly, several costs of begging have been investigated including energetic, growth and predation cost. Begging from humans also occurs under artificial circumstances such as donkeys, elephants and dolphins begging for food from tourists.

== History ==
In 1950, Tinbergen and Perdeck tested the effects of visual stimuli on begging behavior of gull chicks, elucidating which characteristics of their parents' bills the chicks were reacting to. Using models varying in different characteristics, they tested multiple stimuli and found that gull chicks pecked most at a long, red bill with contrasting white bars at the end. Chicks also pecked at other models; in decreasing order of begging intensity were a two-dimensional cardboard cut-out of the head of a gull with a red spot on its bill, simply a bill with a red spot, and a cut-out of a gull's head with no red spot on the bill. These studies showed the chicks were responding to the red spot stimulus on their parents' bills, an example of imprinting.

In 1953, Von Haartman first demonstrated that chick begging is a stimulus to parental feeding and that the begging level of the brood increases with deprivation.

== Strategies ==
Parent–offspring conflict describes the evolutionary conflict arising from differences in optimal fitness of parents and their offspring. While parents tend to maximize the number of offspring, the offspring can increase their fitness by getting a greater share of parental investment often by competing with their siblings. Food distribution by parents among offspring is a key element in the parent-offspring conflict. Young animals are potential competitors and attempt to skew parental food allocation in their favor; this is most often attempted by conspicuous begging displays. Several models have been proposed to explain the evolution of conspicuous offspring solicitation. One model predicts that begging intensity is driven by scramble or sibling competition. A second model is that begging intensity reflects the true condition or need of the individual and that the cost of the signal imposes honesty. A third model predicts that animals respond to the overall signal of the entire brood and that the siblings cooperate to gain the most food.

=== Sibling competition ===
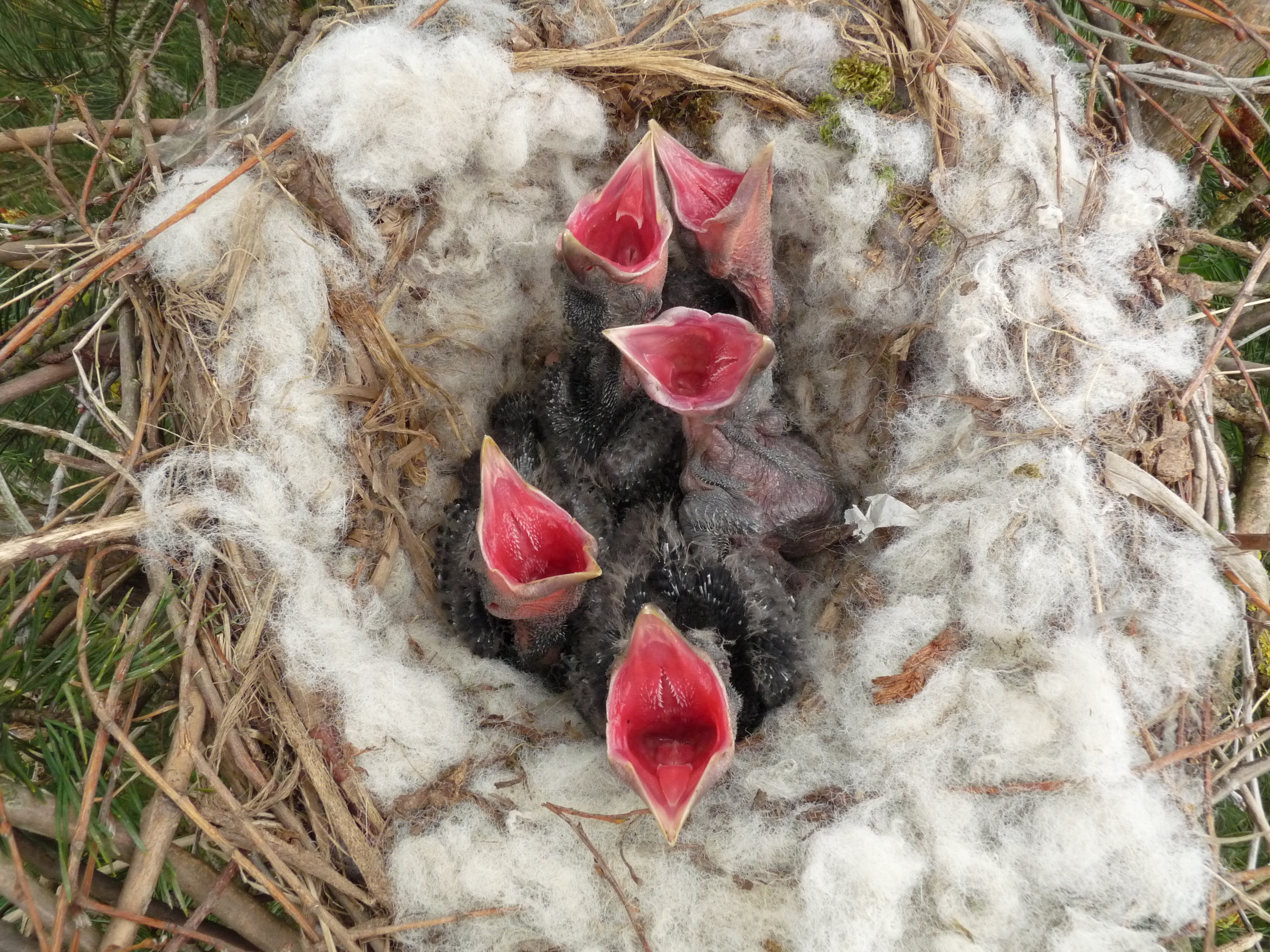
Nestling carrion crow chicks begging

Begging behavior possibly functions in sibling competition. This is the method by which individuals seek to gain more food than their siblings to increase their own individual fitness. Parents need an honest signal from their offspring indicating their level of hunger or need, so that the parents can distribute food accordingly. Offspring want to get as much of the food as possible, so they will want to exaggerate their signals to gain more investment from their parents. However, this conflict is resolved by the cost of excessive begging. Not only does excessive begging attract predators, but it also retards chick growth if begging goes unrewarded. Thus, the cost of increased begging will enforce offspring honesty. A weaker nestling might easily change the intensity at which it begs, but a stronger nestling which is hungry and begging can push to the front of the nest where the parent is.

Competition among nest mates can sometimes encourage adaptations between the siblings. In an experiment where a larger species of bird was placed into a nest with a smaller species, the smaller birds changed the intensity and frequency of their calls to compete with the alien species. The study showed that the smaller birds were fed the same amount as other nestlings in a nest without an intruder.

=== Honest signalling of need ===
Begging by dependent chicks is known to correlate with hunger level; parents use this as a signal of brood demand to adjust their chick feeding behavior. Studies have been conducted which manipulated the competitive environment of individual European starling (Sturnus vulgaris) chicks by altering the state of nest mates while holding the state of target chicks constant. Begging effort of the unmanipulated target chicks was not affected by the changes in begging behavior of their siblings, supporting the view that in this species, begging is a reliable signal of individual chick state and does not involve responses to the effort of nest mates.

=== Cooperative begging ===
The black-headed gull (Larus ridibundus) is a semi-altricial bird with a brood size of one to three siblings. When a parent returns to the nest, its chicks recognize its calls and start begging before the adult lands; begging behaviour is also exhibited when the parent is in the nest. Parents respond to the total solicitation emerging from the nest; therefore, the probability of getting food increases with the number of chicks begging together. The more siblings there are, the more they coordinate their begging while decreasing the number of individual begging bouts. In this way, intra-brood synchronization of begging enables chicks to reduce their effort in begging.

Begging behavior in mongooses is cooperative. Adults are influenced by the total signal emanating from the litter, so that pups who beg at low rates receive more food as litter size increases. Pups increase their begging when litters are reduced or littermates beg at low rates.

=== Non-food solicitation begging ===
African wild dogs (Lycaon pictus) show a ritualised form of begging behaviour which apparently functions as communication of social stability rather than soliciting food. Pack members use body language to show submission to a dominant dog and avoid conflict. They roll over on their bellies or wag their tails. Other signs of submission or appeasement include exposing the throat and food-begging, or licking the corners of the dominant dog's mouth. Pack members show submission towards the alpha female by lying down to “nurse” from her. When two wild dogs meet, they display such submission to one another, muzzle licking, whining, and even regurgitating food to the other. African wild dogs rarely fight over food. If two wild dogs have a piece of food that they both want, rather than inflict injuries upon the other, they will practise "aggressive begging", where they will flatten their ears, curl their lips, lower their front-quarters, curl their tail over their back, and try to crawl under the other wild dog.

Domestic animals, particularly cats and dogs, will often solicit non-food-related resources from humans such as the opportunity for exercise, play, or, grooming. Under these circumstances, the behavior is learned by associative learning rather than instinctive.

== Signals given during begging behavior ==
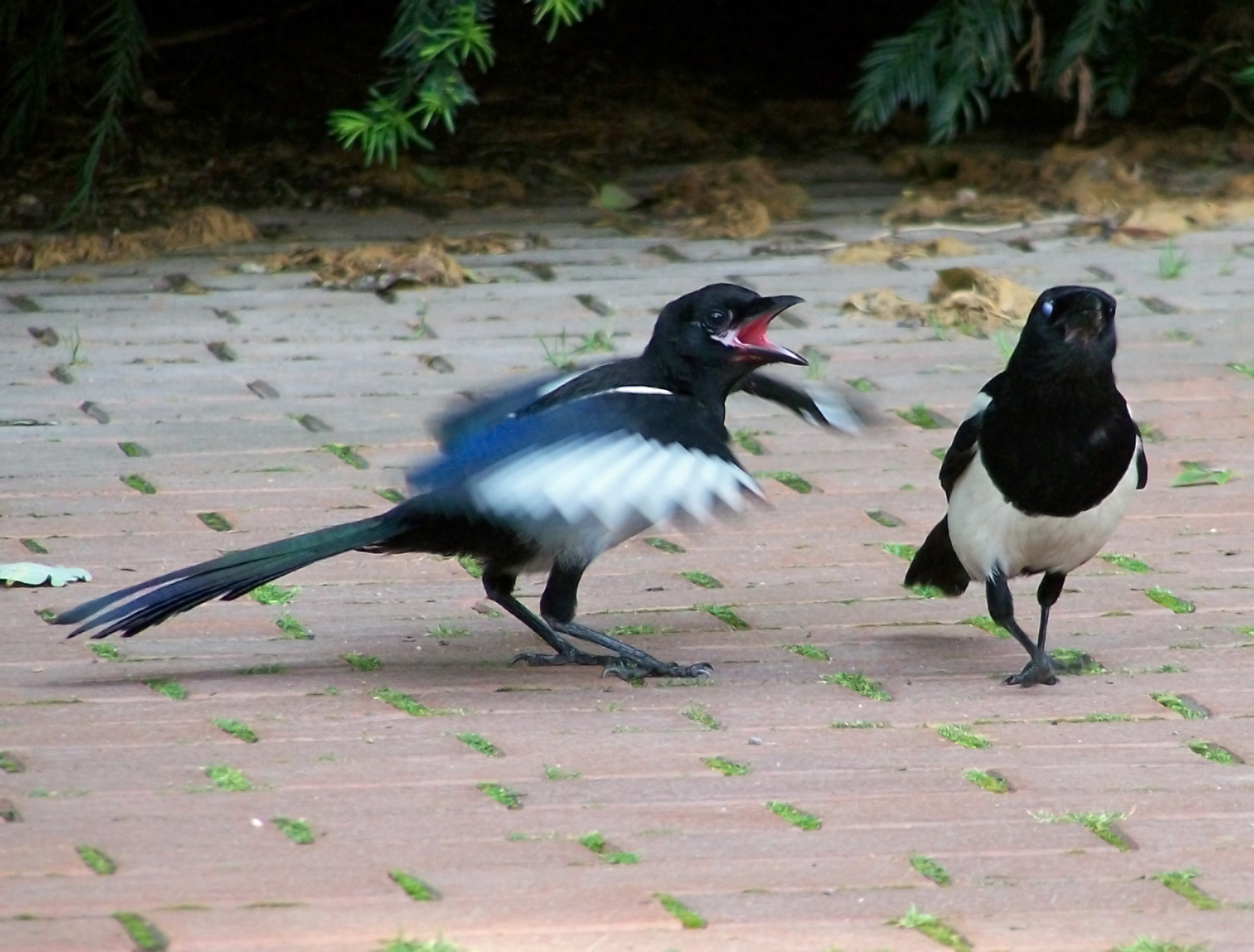
A begging magpie using visual and auditory signals

A juvenile carrion crow intensely begs for food as soon as a nearby adult is seen picking up some food on the ground.

Begging animals may use one or a combination of signals during begging displays.

=== Auditory signals ===
Birds use begging calls when they are young in order to obtain attention from their parents to be fed. Begging calls in birds are very important in enabling parents to recognize their offspring. This is important because of the amount of energy expended giving care to and feeding the offspring. Acoustic cues are incredibly important in recognizing chicks. Acoustic cues work over long and short distances, as well as for individual recognition. Birds beg more intensely when they are hungry even though it expends more energy. Larger birds are able to beg longer and expend more calories. Therefore, they are fed more and continue to grow larger.

Nestling tree swallows produce a begging display when their parents arrive at the nest with food, but they also beg to apparently inappropriate stimuli in the absence of parents, such as movements of the nest or broodmates. Begging rate and intensity varied in response to recordings of (1) a tree swallow adult landing on a nestbox and calling and (2) a common grackle (Quiscalis quiscala), a nest predator, landing on a nestbox. Nestlings increased the rate and intensity of their begging responses to both swallow and grackle stimulus sounds as time without food increased, although responses to the grackle sounds were always less than to the swallow sounds.

When cuckoo chicks were reared in the nests of four hosts (reed warbler, great reed warbler, dunnock and meadow pipit), dunnock-cuckoos began begging more rapidly than reed warbler-cuckoos despite growing at the same rate. Perhaps surprisingly, the cuckoos do not vary their begging call note structure to match that of their hosts' chicks.

Meerkat pups change their begging behavior by increasing it up to 80 percent more when near adults that give out food at the highest rate versus those that give the least. Pups also beg relatively consistently when next to specific adults, indicating there is an adaptability strategy in the way the pups beg.

=== Visual signals ===
Begging passerine chicks display brightly colored mouths as they solicit food from their parents. For example, Atlantic canary (Serinus canaria) nestlings display deep pink mouths, but mouths are orange in dunnocks (Prunella modularis) and yellow in European robins (Erithacus rubecula). The mouths of canary nestlings are relatively unusual in that, following the onset of each begging bout, they exhibit a rapid change in color intensity. Changes in mouth color accurately reflect a nestling's state of need: the more food-deprived the chick, the more intensely coloured its mouth. In controlled experiments with two nestlings, parents were offered the opportunity to choose which nestling to feed. When the mouth color of one offspring was artificially reddened using food coloring, parents gave it more food.

According to sex allocation theory, parents may gain fitness benefits from favoring offspring of either sex, depending on ecological conditions or parental quality. This means the parents can only adapt their behavior if they can identify the sex of their offspring. Male nestling barn swallows have more brightly colored mouths than their female broodmates early in the nestling period. Sex differences in mouth coloration disappear later in the nestling period when, however, differences in begging calls develop. Thus, begging displays can carry sex-specific components.

== Costs ==
Begging behavior can incur several types of cost.

Energetic: During begging, nestlings stretch their necks and bodies, gape, and flap their wings. The vigor of these movements indicate that begging may be energetically costly to the individual, however, evidence for this is contradictory. When energetic expenditure was measured in begging tree swallow chicks it was found to be 1.27 or 1.28 times the resting metabolic rate, indicating that begging is relatively cheap, however, it may be costly in conditions of low food availability. House wren (Troglodytes aedon) energetic expenditure also increases by a similar fraction during begging, but because other forms of exercise incur greater metabolic costs, begging was interpreted to be relatively cost-free in this species. However, the evidence for cheap begging stems entirely from experiments in which chicks were allowed to beg at an intensity of their own choice. Measuring expenditure in this way certainly documents the effort involved in begging, but it does not measure cost, as specified theoretically.

Risk of predation: Nestlings giving repeated begging calls could enable predators to more easily locate the nest. This has been tested by comparing predation rates at artificial nests with and without playbacks of bird begging calls. In trials where tapes were played in an artificial nest with quail eggs, these nests were destroyed by predators before nearby “quiet” nests. Ground-nesting birds are at a greater risk to predation than tree-nesting birds; nestlings of these species have higher frequency begging chirps which travel less distance than lower frequency calls which could reduce their vulnerability to predators. Another behavioral adaptation is that when a nest is in danger, parents give alarm calls which temporarily stop the begging calls of the nestlings.

Growth cost: Begging incurs a growth cost in canary chicks. When the brood is very hungry, begging becomes a form of scramble competition whereby offspring jostle to be closest to the feeding adult. When the brood has recently been fed, adults instead actively choose offspring to feed because begging reliably signals nestling hunger. Experimental manipulations of begging behaviour and food reward show that excessive begging retards growth, both immediately and in the longer term, and the impact of the manipulation is greatest in chicks with the highest potential daily mass gain. Furthermore, the greater the difference in begging intensity between siblings during the experiment, the greater the difference between them in the mass lost as a result of metabolic expenditure. This growth cost of begging can be interpreted as a fitness cost, because daily mass gain is strongly correlated with the likelihood of survival to independence. Begging may incur an additional indirect growth cost through its actions on digestive efficiency. Chicks that are forced to beg excessively produce a greater number of fecal sacs, although not more fecal waste in total, than their less exercised siblings. The faster rate of fecal sac production may indicate an increased digesta throughput rate, which is known to reduce digestive efficiency.

== Birds ==
Begging behaviour is performed by a wide range of nestling or fledgling birds and is perhaps best understood in these animals.

Begging behavior occurs when dependent young signal their need for resources, usually food. Closely related nestmates tend to beg less intensely than birds who are nestmates with other species, such as brood parasites. Short-term need usually increases the frequency and intensity of begging by nestmates.

=== Penguins ===
Begging behavior in some penguins is unusual among birds in that under some circumstances, it involves the chick chasing the parent. Well-developed feeding chases seem to take place only in the Adélie, chinstrap and gentoo penguins. Chicks of these species join creches at about two to five weeks of age. When an adult comes ashore, it approaches its nest site and gives a series of display calls. If not already at the nest site, its chicks will emerge from the crèche, approach the vocalizing adult and beg for food. The adult may feed its offspring at this point or run off, pursued by the begging chicks, which it stops intermittently to feed. Chases are almost absent in one-chick broods, or situations in which one sibling is removed from the crèche and only the remaining sibling begs for food. Feeding chases therefore appear to separate offspring in two-chick broods, so parents can feed them more efficiently. Parents start to run as a direct consequence of the distance between siblings and stop as soon as siblings become separated.

== Mammals ==
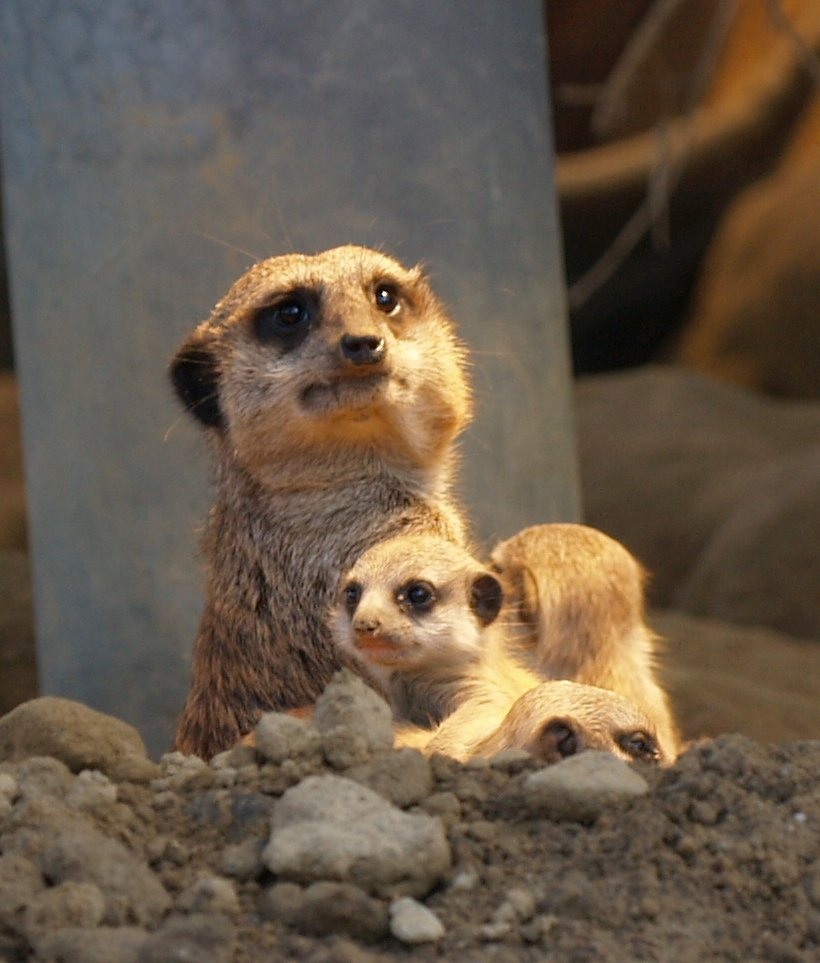
Meerkat with youngster

Young mammals often demand resources from their parents by screaming, bleating or crying, and sometimes by direct tussling.

Meerkat (Suricata suricatta): When meerkat pups begin accompanying the group during foraging, they beg food from older group members, who dig up prey items. The probability of a prey item being fed to a pup shows a positive relationship with prey size and a negative relationship with pup distance. Meerkats apparently follow a "feed the nearest pup rule" and are more likely to feed the nearest pup if it is hungry. Hungrier pups beg more and follow older group members more closely. Adult meerkats preferred to provision speakers playing back recordings of two pups begging alternately to recordings of the same two pups begging simultaneously. This indicates that meerkat pups avoid some of the costs of direct competition incurred by an escalation of begging as other pups beg, by begging in gaps between the bouts of others or avoiding littermates.

Banded mongoose (Mungos mungo): Banded mongooses live in large family groups of 5–75. Females give birth in synchrony, producing large communal litters which remain in dens for 3–4 weeks. When pups emerge from the den, they spend 3–5 days approaching different helpers, after which individual pups form stable associations with a single adult helper (their "escort") and remain associated with that animal until independence (approximately 9–13 weeks). During a foraging session, pups follow escorts closely (usually within 10 cm), begging constantly with a high-pitched, bird-like chirp (average call rate = 34.4 calls/min). Packs forage as a cohesive unit, concentrated within 15–20 m, so all escorts are exposed to begging by the whole litter. Pups receive their food almost exclusively from their escorts. Switching between escorts is rare and lasts for only a single day before returning to the original escort. Escorts do not feed pups associated with another adult. Begging behavior in mongooses is unusual in that it is cooperative. Escorts are influenced by the total signal emanating from the litter, so that pups who beg at low rates receive more food as litter size increases. Pups increase their begging when litters are reduced or littermates beg at low rates.

Bottlenose dolphin (genus Tursiops): It has been observed that bottlenose dolphins remained very close to any individual that had caught a prey, displaying a behavior that was termed "begging".

== Amphibians ==
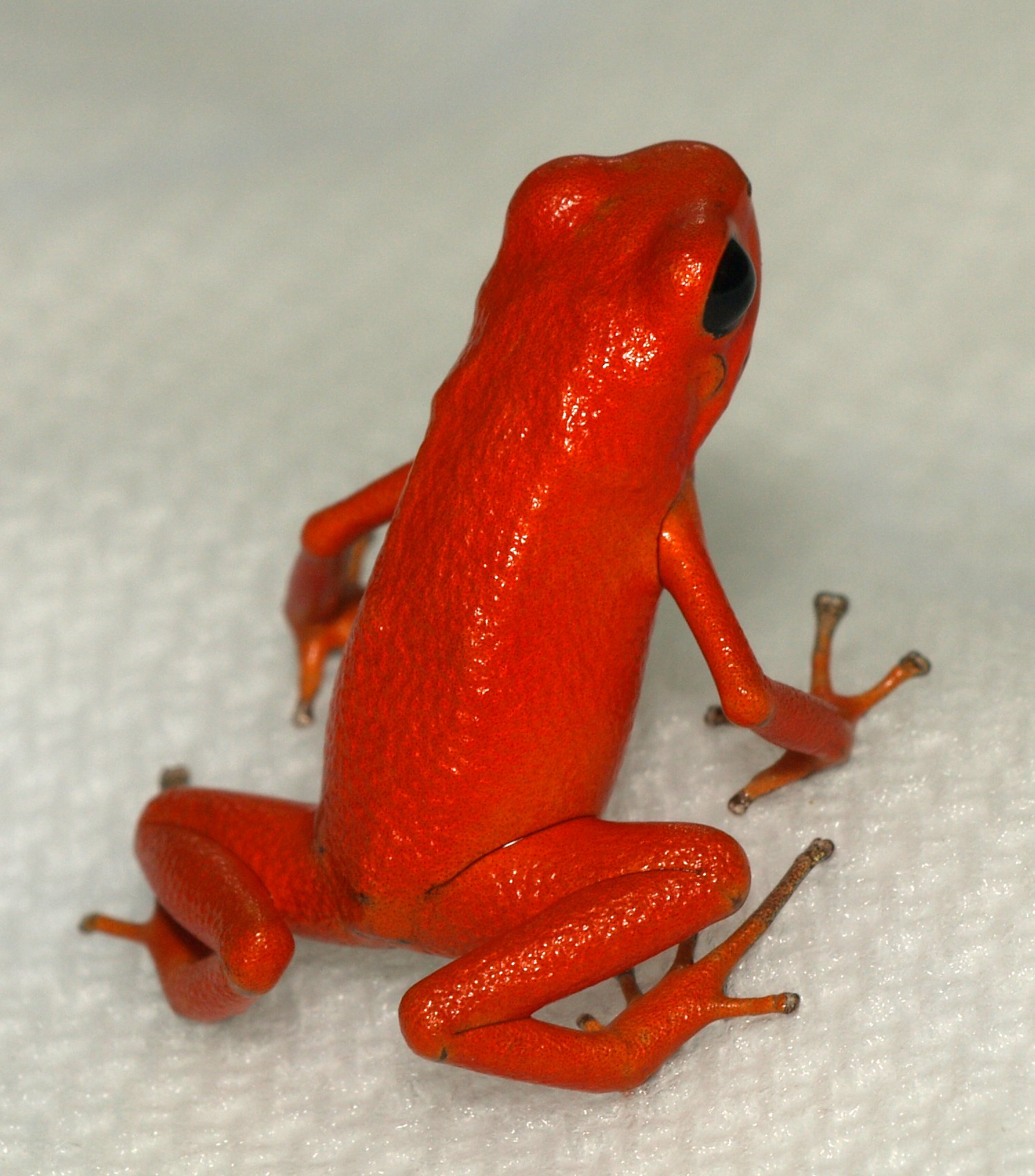
Strawberry poison dart frog

Poison dart frog (Dendrobatidae): Many species of poison dart frog are dedicated parents. Some species in the Oophaga and Ranitomeya genera carry their newly hatched tadpoles into the canopy; the tadpoles stick to the mucus on the backs of their parents. Once in the upper reaches of the rainforest trees, the parents deposit their young in the pools of water that accumulate in epiphytic plants, often with only one tadpole in each pool. The mother visits the nursery, sometimes on a daily basis, for the 43–52 days that the young remain in the tadpole stage. When the mother arrives, the tadpole usually starts swimming around the pool and in response to this, the mother lays unfertilized eggs into the pool which the tadpole eats. The tadpole's swimming may represent either its nutritional need or worthiness for food. It has been suggested that these mother frogs may recognize their own tadpoles by specific begging behaviors.

It has been reported that when the strawberry poison dart frog females visit their pools, she lowers her vent into the water whereupon the tadpole moves against her, stiffens, and vibrates. This stimulates the female to release 1-5 unfertilized eggs, which comprise the tadpole's sole diet.

== Invertebrates ==
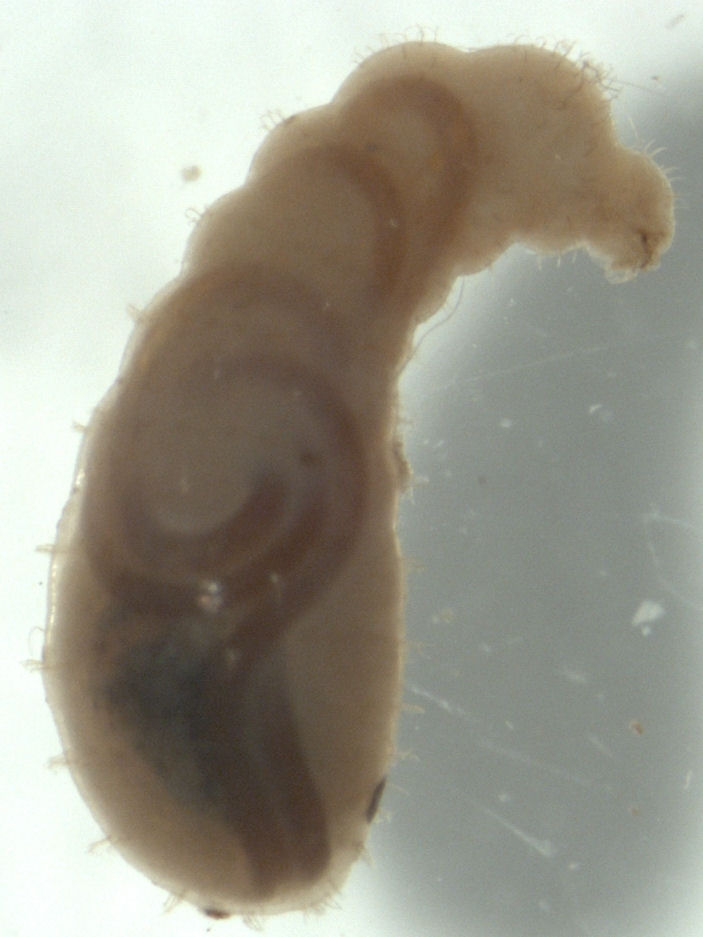
Ant larva (with parasitic nematode)

Aside from eusocial species such as ants and honey bees, parental care and therefore begging is rare among insects.

Burying beetles (Nicrophorus vespilloides): Larval burying beetles beg visually, making a waving motion when their parents arrive. When parent beetles lay eggs, they provide a dead animal to nourish the young. As the eggs hatch and larvae grow, the parents feed their brood with regurgitated carcass. The costs of begging by these larvae have been investigated. Begging behavior was controlled by the presence or absence of a dead parent, simultaneously with the opportunity to self-feed through the presence or absence of food. The presence of a dead parent stimulated larval begging, whereas larvae never begged when the dead parent was absent. However, the presence or absence of a dead parent had no effect on larval growth. Likewise, the interaction between the presence or absence of food and the presence or absence of a dead parent had no effect on growth. The authors concluded that there was no evidence of either a growth cost or an opportunity cost of larval begging in N. vespilloides and that cost-free, or low-cost begging, could be more common than usually considered.

Termites: Larvae of a Japanese subterranean termite, Reticulitermes speratus, use an overt food solicitation termed “pecking” as a cue for worker feeding. Direct observations demonstrated that workers feed larvae in response to larval pecking. Furthermore, nutritional experiments show that larvae exhibited pecking more frequently when their nutrient status is lower; hence, pecking may be an honest signal of larval hunger status.

Ant (Gnamptogenys striatula): Workers of the ponerine ant preferentially feed larvae that are either near food or perform a typical swaying behavior. In this swaying behavior, larvae raise their head and neck, and gently reach and wave towards workers or food items. Hungry larvae sway more than well-fed larvae, suggesting that swaying is an honest signal in begging for food.

== Modulators ==
=== Hormonal ===
Testosterone modulates begging behavior

The endocrine system could be a regulating system for begging behavior. Altricial nestlings are known to produce their own testosterone, starting even before hatching and have rapidly increasing testosterone production throughout the nestling period. Elevated levels of nestling testosterone are correlated with more intense begging displays in canaries, slender-billed prions (Pachyptila belcheri) and European pied flycatchers (Ficedula hypoleuca). Testosterone affects the length of begging displays. Maternal testosterone levels deposited into egg yolks have been found to affect the hierarchy of begging chicks. Corticosterone increases begging effort and food provisioning rates by parents. Corticosterone implanted chicks beg more frequently than non-implanted chicks. When there is a shortage of food, corticosterone levels increase, leading to begging. The ultimate function of begging is to obtain more food and thereby the fitness of the begging bird. Birds evolved the behaviour of begging so they could gain more attention from their parents and be fed. This is evolutionarily beneficial to the parents because they will have greater reproductive success and contribute more of their genes to further generations.

The larvae of burying beetles feed partly by begging for predigested carrion from parents and partly by self-feeding. In this species, juvenile hormone, a major regulatory insect hormone, stimulates begging and growth. Elevating larval juvenile hormone levels (by topical application of the analogue methoprene) increase begging indicating that juvenile hormone in insects could have a similar function to that of testosterone and corticosterone in birds. Elevated juvenile hormone levels have a negative effect on larval growth regardless of whether larvae forage by begging or by self-feeding. This shows that the effects of juvenile hormone on larval growth are independent of the effects on begging, suggesting that the mechanisms by which juvenile hormone affects offspring growth in insects differ from those by which testosterone and corticosterone affect growth in birds.

=== Genetic ===
Sibling relatedness in a brood also influences the level of begging. In a study on passerine birds, it was found that chicks begged more loudly in species with higher levels of extra-pair paternity.

=== Sibling negotiation ===
Although begging is assumed to be directed at parents, barn owl (Tyto alba) nestlings vocalize in the presence but also in the absence of the parents. The "sibling negotiation hypothesis" proposes that offspring use each other's begging vocalization as a source of information about their relative willingness to contest the next prey item delivered. This predicts that the more hungry nestling will contest the next item delivered while the less hungry one will retreat to avoid injuries and/or save energy. Nestling barn owls refrain from vocalization when a rival is more hungry, but escalate once the rival has been fed by a parent, and refrain from and escalate vocalization in enlarged and reduced broods. Thus, when parents are not at the nest, a nestling vocally refrains when the value of the next delivered prey item will be higher for its nest-mates.

== Animals begging from humans ==
=== Captive animals ===
Captive wild animals held in zoos or wildlife parks will often perform begging behavior directed to gaining food from caretaker staff and members of the public visiting the enclosure. Many of these animals are adults and several hypotheses have been proposed as the proximate cause of this behavior under these artificial conditions. These proposals include:

- Boredom arising from a lack of stimulation and opportunity to engage in the appetitive component of feeding behaviour.
- Hunger arising from inadequate nutrition and a feeding regime that does not take into account the natural foraging ecology of the animal.

Oriental small-clawed otters captive in zoos often beg, but in one study, it was found that when begging from visitors to the zoo, they only begged from those wearing blue shirts in the same shade as that worn by the keepers. In the same study, the environment was manipulated to test whether "boredom" or "hunger" was the primary causal factor. These manipulations revealed that both increased begging behavior, but this was greater for the manipulation testing the "hunger" hypothesis.

=== Trained animals ===
Several species of animals are trained by humans to perform begging behavior to earn money or food.

Fishermen in central Philippines have been feeding whale sharks young shrimp since the 1980s. The practice makes the animals rise to the surface begging for food, for the amusement of tourists. Marine biologists are concerned the practice could make the fish dependent on handouts from people.

=== Wildlife ===
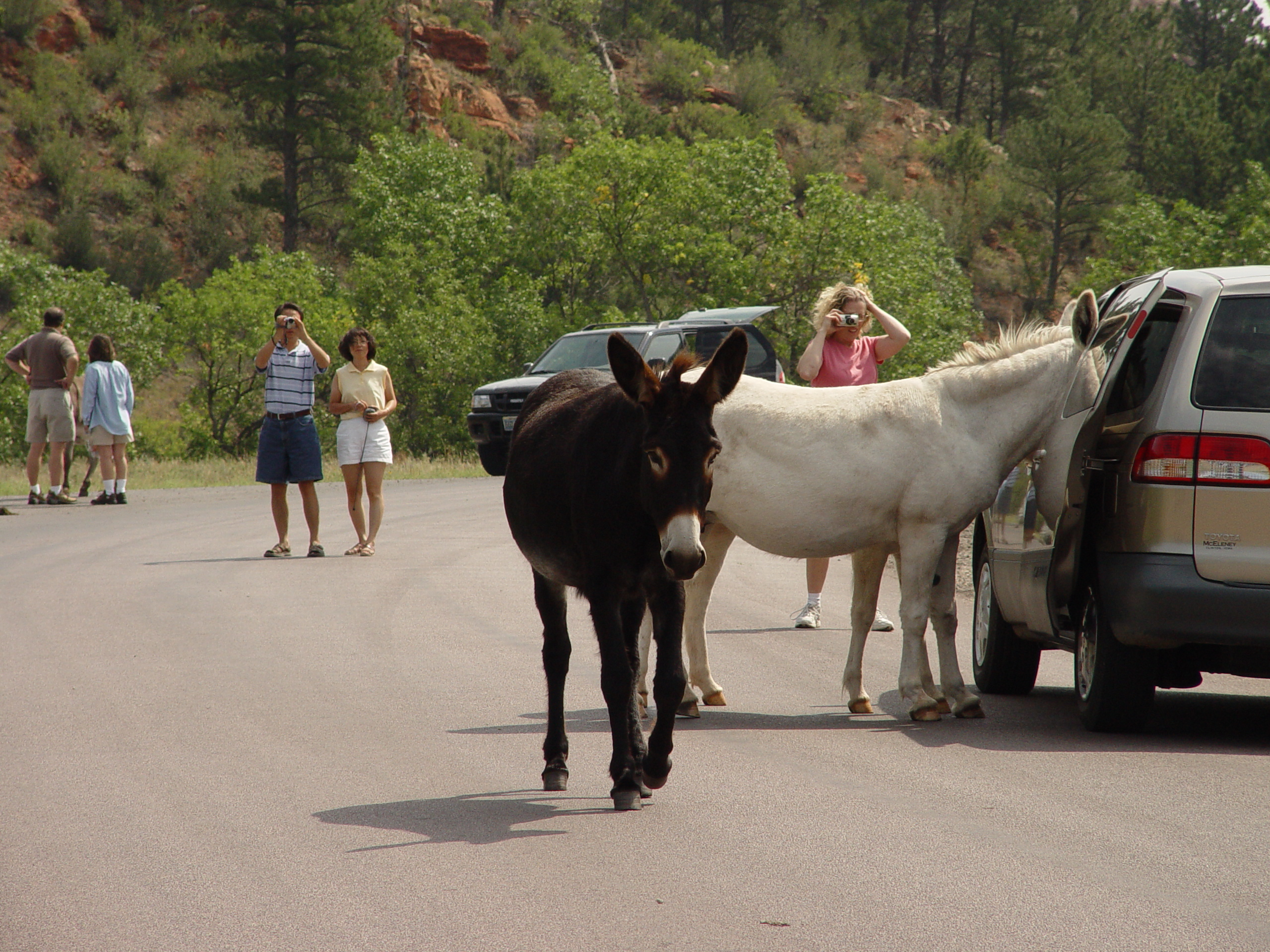
The well known 'begging burros' (feral donkeys) of Custer State Park in South Dakota, United States, begging food from tourists

Several wild species adapt to gaining food from humans. Many of these animals are adults and therefore the causal factors and ethological considerations are different from those above.

Feral donkeys in Custer State Park (US) have for many years been approaching cars passing through the park and begging for food. Many people bring food to the park specifically for the purpose of feeding these animals. The "Begging Burros" inhabit one area of the park on a hill where approximately 50 of them try to obtain any food they can. Custer State Park's roadway is blocked off by these animals to the point where a driver needs to sound their horn to pass and continue through the park.

Wild elephants in Udawalawe National Park (Sri Lanka) congregate along several places on the road where fruit vendors have set up shop; people in passing vehicles stop to buy fruit and feed the elephants.

Bottlenose dolphins beg for food from fishermen who feed them illegally in Cockburn Sound, Perth, Western Australia. In a decade-long study, researchers found the number of dolphins which begged recreational fishermen for food increased from one to at least 14, representing 20% of the 75 adult dolphins which live in the area. During the study, dolphins were seen to be learning from each other to beg and evidence of a young calf learning to beg from her mother was observed. Begging by dolphins occurs in other areas worldwide.

== See also ==
- Begging in humans
