= Polkadot poison frog =

Conservation status
- Critically Endangered (IUCN 3.1)

Scientific classification
- Kingdom: Animalia
- Phylum: Chordata
- Class: Amphibia
- Order: Anura
- Family: Dendrobatidae
- Genus: Oophaga
- Species: O. arborea

Binomial name
- Oophaga arborea (Myers, Daly & Martínez, 1984)

Synonyms
- Dendrobates arboreus Myers, Daly and Martínez, 1984; Oophaga arboreus (Myers, Daly & Martínez, 1984)

Species of amphibian

The polkadot poison frog (Oophaga arborea) is a species of frogs in the family Dendrobatidae endemic to Panama, where it is known as rana venenosa in Spanish. Its natural habitats are humid lowland and montane forests. It is threatened by habitat loss and is listed by the IUCN as being "critically endangered".

== Description ==
The snout-to-vent length of the polkadot poison frog is 20 to 22 mm (0.8 to 0.9 in). The hind limbs are short and the forelimbs relatively long with large hands. The fingers are unwebbed, the second one being longer than the first, and all but the first finger have flat discs of thickened skin. This frog has brown eyes and no teeth in its upper jaw. Males have a small vocal sac on the throat, and when not in use, this hangs in folds. The skin on the belly and inside the thighs is coarsely wrinkled. This frog is black or some shade of brown with roundish yellow spots, which often have a raised surface. The call made by the male is similar to that of closely related species but can be distinguished by its pitch, duration and the length of time between successive calls.

== Taxonomy ==
This species is most closely related to O. pumilio, O. sylvatica, O. speciosa, and O. granulifera.

== Biology ==
The polkadot poison frog is arboreal in its habits, living among the mosses and epiphytic plants growing on trees in the dense forests of western Panama at altitudes of up to 1,120 metres (3,670 ft) above sea level. The male typically chooses the leaf of a bromeliad plant on which to call to attract a mate. If receptive, the female joins him in a courtship ritual after which a small batch of about four to eight eggs is laid on the leaf and fertilised by the male. The female remains with the eggs for a short time after which the male covers them with his body. The newly hatched tadpoles are carried to water bodies, such as pools forming in the rosettes of bromeliads, where they develop.

== Status ==
The total extent of occurrence of the polkadot poison frog is less than 5,000 square kilometres (1,900 sq mi), and even within this range, there are a number of separate subpopulations. The population trend of this frog is unknown but the forests in which it lives are being affected by logging. Another factor limiting its numbers may be collection for the pet trade, and it may be susceptible to the disease chytridiomycosis. However, part of its range is within the bounds of the Parque Internacional La Amistad and the Bosque Protector Palo Seco. Taking these various factors into account, the IUCN has listed the conservation status of this species as "critically endangered".
