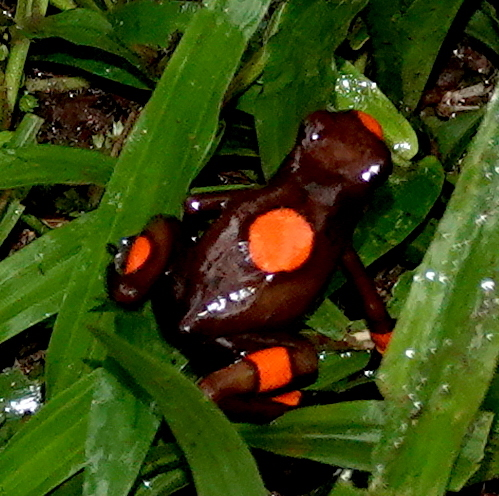

Conservation status
- Critically Endangered (IUCN 3.1)

Scientific classification
- Kingdom: Animalia
- Phylum: Chordata
- Class: Amphibia
- Order: Anura
- Family: Dendrobatidae
- Genus: Oophaga
- Species: O. histrionica

Binomial name
- Oophaga histrionica (Berthold, 1845)

Synonyms
- Dendrobates histrionicus Berthold, 1845

= Harlequin poison frog =

Species of amphibian

The harlequin poison frog, also known as harlequin poison-dart frog (Oophaga histrionica), is a species of poison dart frog endemic to the Chocó region of western Colombia. The frog is normally found on the ground of tropical rain forests, among fallen limbs or leaf litter. Some frogs traditionally classified as Oophaga histrionica were separated as new species in 2018. These are Oophaga anchicayensis, Oophaga andresi and Oophaga solanensis.

== Description ==
The harlequin poison frog has an average snout–vent length of 32.9 millimetres (1.30 in). The background coloration varies from light to dark brown, and there is usually a vivid spot on the dorsum.

== Life history ==
The harlequin poison frog lives on the forest floor. The male calls from a low perch to advertise his presence. The male and female frog call to each other and touch each other before the female lays eggs among the leaf litter. When the eggs hatch, a parent transports the newly hatched tadpoles to a tiny water reservoir (often in the axil of a bromeliad). The mother returns periodically and lays unfertilized eggs, on which the tadpoles feed until ready to metamorphose and exit the water. The larva is an obligate egg-feeder and will starve without this form of nutrition. Adults feed on ants and mites on the ground after sunrise but not later than 16:00, when they are finding refuge either on the ground under leaf litter or elevated on fallen logs.

This rearing behavior makes harlequins among the most difficult poison dart frogs to raise in captivity. As a result, they are not widely found on the domestic pet market, and those available may be illegally smuggled imports rather than legally bred domestic animals. Wild-caught dart frogs are often stressed, require more care, have a much higher fatality rate, and may also be toxic and dangerous to handle. A few domestically bred animals are nevertheless available and are highly sought after in the pet trade.

== Habitat ==
This terrestrial frog lives in rainforests, where it has been observed between 300 and 700 meters above se level. Its range includes Parque Nacional Tatamá, but this is not a protected park.

== Poison ==
O. histrionica, along with O. speciosa, produces cardiotoxins known as histrionicotoxins. These moderate to highly toxic compounds act as potent noncompetitive antagonists of nicotinic acetylcholine receptors, binding to a regulatory site on the delta subunit of the ion channel complex. They also have some affinity for sodium and potassium channels, although they are much less potent for these targets. The synthesis of histrionicotoxins and various homologues is synthetically challenging and has been the subject of many different attempts.

== Status ==
The IUCN has listed this species as being "Critically Endangered" because of its small range and the ongoing destruction of its rainforest habitat. Its numbers seem to be declining. This habitat loss comes from deforestation associated with mining. The IUCN also cites harvest of the frog for the international pet trade as a threat.
