= La Brea poison frog =

Conservation status
- Critically Endangered (IUCN 3.1)

Scientific classification
- Kingdom: Animalia
- Phylum: Chordata
- Class: Amphibia
- Order: Anura
- Family: Dendrobatidae
- Genus: Oophaga
- Species: O. occultator

Binomial name
- Oophaga occultator (Myers & Daly, 1976)

Synonyms
- Dendrobates occultator Myers & Daly, 1976

Species of amphibian

The La Brea poison frog (Oophaga occultator, formerly Dendrobates occultator) is a species of frogs in the family Dendrobatidae endemic to the Cordillera Occidental in the Cauca Department of Colombia, near La Brea.

This frog is difficult to see, hence its Latin name, occultator.

This species lives mainly on the ground in undisturbed, lowland rainforest, but it can also be found perching on leaves at different levels above the ground. There are no degraded habitats within its tiny known range, and so its adaptability to secondary habitats is unknown. It has been observed on cocoa plantations near forest.

The female frog lays eggs on moist leaf litter or moss. After the eggs hatch, she moves the tadpoles to bromeliad plant or fallen palm leaves that contain pools of water, where the tadpoles develop. She returns to deposit unfertilized eggs for the tadpoles to eat.

The IUCN classifies this frog as critically endangered due to its small known range. This area is under threat from mining, illegal farms, and pollution from the pesticides used on those farms. Scientists suspect the frog may occur more widely, but civil unrest in this area has made it difficult to conduct surveys. The international pet trade may also pose some threat, but the unrest is a barrier to this as well.
