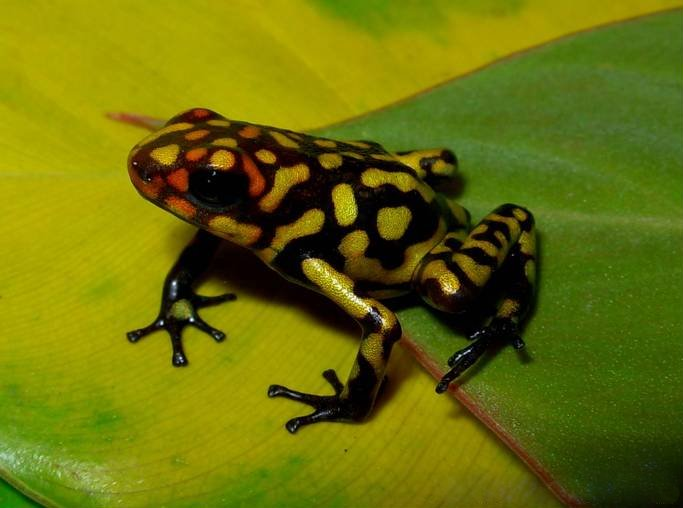

Conservation status
- Endangered (IUCN 3.1)

Scientific classification
- Kingdom: Animalia
- Phylum: Chordata
- Class: Amphibia
- Order: Anura
- Family: Dendrobatidae
- Genus: Oophaga
- Species: O. anchicayensis

Binomial name
- Oophaga anchicayensis Posso-Terranova & Andrés, 2018

= Oophaga anchicayensis =

Species of poison frog

Oophaga anchicayensis is a species of poison frog in the family Dendrobatidae. It lives in western Colombia. It is one of three species that were separated from Oophaga histrionica in 2018.

== Taxonomy ==
Oophaga anchicayensis has traditionally been classified as Oophaga histrionica, a phenotypically diverse species. In 2018, Posso-Terranova and Andrés showed evidence for Oophaga histrionica being a species complex, which they separated into four distinct species. In addition to Oophaga histrionica (sensu stricto), they recognized three previously undescribed species, one of which they named Oophaga anchicayensis. The species epithet refers to San José de Anchicayá, from where the holotype was collected.

Oophaga anchicayensis and Oophaga lehmanni are parapatric species, and hybridization has been shown to occur between them. It has been suggested that the hybrids are a result of recent human-mediated translocation, but genomic analyses by Ebersbach et al. (2018) instead support an older, presumably natural hybridization. As natural hybrids, Ebersbach considers these frogs to be equally deserving of protection as the parent species, as opposed to a threat to species diversity. However, frogs hybridized by humans may occur in the pet trade, where the intermediate color morph between Oophaga anchicayensis and Oophaga lehmanni has commercial value.

== Description ==
Oophaga anchicayensis has yellow, orange, or greenish dorsal spots on a black background. The number of spots is highly variable. The poison frog is large, with an average snout–vent length of 40.2 millimetres (1.58 in).

== Distribution and habitat ==
The species is found in western Colombia in an area of less than 800 square kilometres (309 sq mi). It lives in the foothills of Farallones de Cali, the Andes, in altitudes between 360 metres (1,181 ft) and 790 metres (2,592 ft). Oophaga anchicayensis is terrestrial, and its habitat is tropical rainforest.

== Threats ==
The population of Oophaga anchicayensis is in decline, and the species has been listed as Endangered on the IUCN Red List. It is heavily sought after in the international wildlife market, and illegal collection is the main threat to the species. There is also relatively strong pressure from deforestation.
