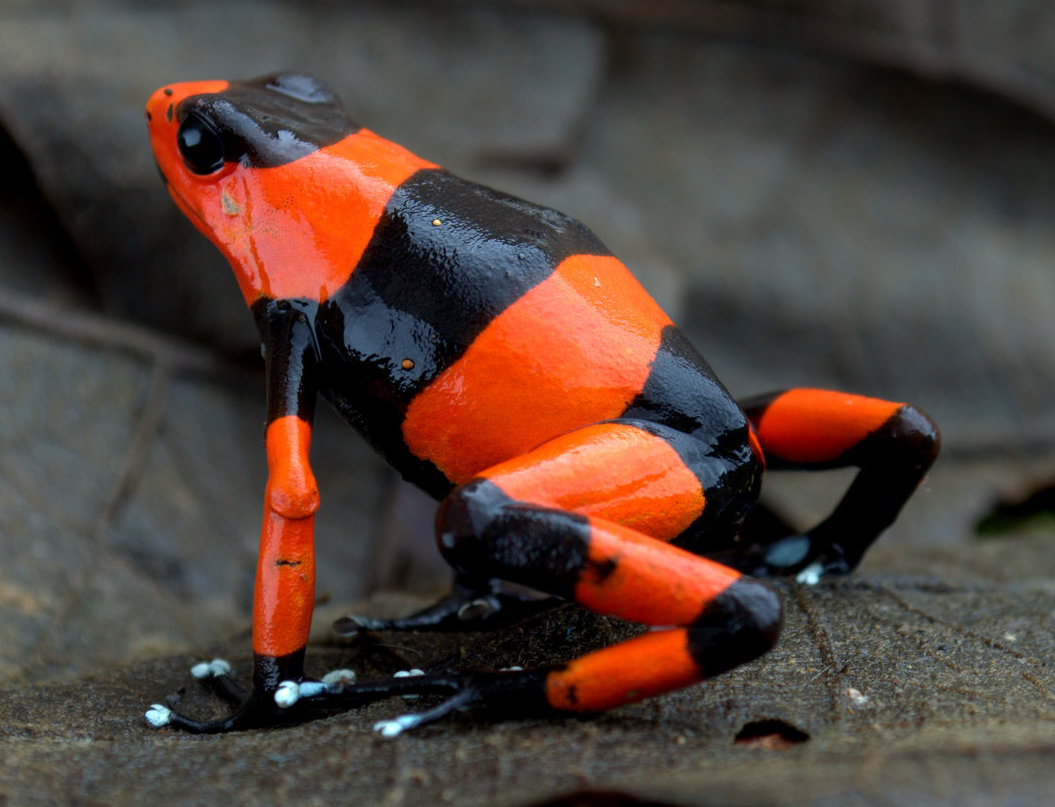

Conservation status
- Critically Endangered (IUCN 3.1)

Scientific classification
- Kingdom: Animalia
- Phylum: Chordata
- Class: Amphibia
- Order: Anura
- Family: Dendrobatidae
- Genus: Oophaga
- Species: O. lehmanni

Binomial name
- Oophaga lehmanni (Myers and Daly, 1976)

Synonyms
- Dendrobates lehmanni Myers and Daly, 1976

= Lehmann's poison frog =

Species of amphibian

Lehmann's poison frog or the red-banded poison frog (Oophaga lehmanni) is a species of poison dart frog in the family Dendrobatidae endemic to a small part of western Colombia. Its natural habitats are submontane tropical rainforests. It is threatened by habitat loss and collection for the pet trade, and the IUCN lists it as being "critically endangered". It was named after Colombian conservation biologist Federico Carlos Lehmann.

== Description ==
Lehmann's poison frog has a smooth skin and exhibits aposematic colouration, which warns predators that it is inedible. There are red, orange and yellow morphs of this frog. The background colour is black or dark brown which contrasts with the two bright, broad bands of colour round the body and further coloured bands on the limbs. The first toe is shorter than the second and the toes of males have silver tips. This frog grows to a snout-to-vent length of 31 to 36 mm (1.2 to 1.4 in).

It is very similar in appearance to the harlequin poison frog (Oophaga histrionicus), a species with which it can hybridise, and there is ongoing debate as to whether it is in fact a separate species. There are distinct differences in the calls of the males between northern and southern populations.

== Habitat ==
Oophaga lehmanni inhabits Colombia's rain forests. Although they are typically found on the ground, these frogs can occasionally be found in low shrubs and trees. Poison frogs depend on a wide variety of microhabitats in different life stages. Leaf litter and phytotelmata, for example, serve as primary breeding sites, shelters, and nurseries for poison frogs; in addition to being defendable resources for territorial species, they provide more stable temperature and humidity conditions than open areas with little canopy.

Stream noise appears to be a selective force strong enough to promote micro-geographic divergence in calls despite the counteracting effect of genetic flow at the micro-geographic scale. In addition to making high-frequency sounds, certain species of frogs living in noisy environments were also considerably smaller. These findings provide credence to a hitherto unrecognized function of noise on streams as a selection force encouraging a rise in call frequency and pleiotropic changes in body size.

== Taxonomy ==
=== Color morphs ===
Lehmann's poison frog comes in three color morphs: red, orange, and yellow against black or dark brown. The frog has two bands of vibrant color surrounding its mostly black tone. There are two bands: one around the rear hump and the other behind the skull. The dark shatters the patterns of vibrant colors in an uneven manner. The vivid colors also encircle the arms and legs. The stomach follows this trend as well. Every individual exhibits unique patterns. Legs and arms have colored bands as well. Male toe tips are silver in color. Aposematic coloration, so named because of its vivid pattern, serves as a predator warning.

== Toxicity ==
Oophaga lehmanni produce toxins in their skin that can be very poisonous. Some of the native tribes of Columbia coat their darts with the poison produced by the frogs. When bred in captivity the frogs are not poisonous because the diet that they are fed lacks the precursors needed to produce the poison. The toxic skin secretions of Oophaga lehmanni are also being studied for medicinal purposes.

=== Aposematism ===
Studies in progress reveal at least three novel classes of toxic alkaloids in skin secretions of Neotropical dendrobatid frogs include Batrachotoxins, Pumiliotoxins, and Histrionicotoxins. At least eight alkaloids have been found in methanolic extracts of skins, including moderate concentrations of two unidentified substances, minor amounts of pumiliotoxin A, and quite high amounts of pumiliotoxin B. Lehmann's poison frog, a new species, lacks histrionicotoxins and produces pumiliotoxins and other alkaloids not detected by histrionicus; it is a black frog with crossbands of vivid orange or orange-red.

== Distribution ==
Lehmann's poison frog is endemic to Colombia where it is found in tropical forests in the drainage of the Anchicayá River to the west of Dagua in Valle del Cauca Department, as well as in one locality in Chocó Department, all on the slopes of the Cordillera Occidental. Its altitudinal range is 600–1,200 m (1,969–3,937 ft). There are several separate populations and the total area of occupancy is less than 10 km^{2} (3.9 sq mi).

== Biology ==
Lehmann's poison frog is diurnal and primarily feeds on small insects. It is found on the forest floor and in low vegetation. Breeding takes place at the end of the rainy season. The male chooses a suitable location and calls repeatedly to attract a female. She deposits a small number of large eggs on leaves up to 120 cm (4 ft) above the forest floor where the male fertilises them. He keeps them moist and rotates them occasionally and after two to four weeks he carries them on his back and deposits them singly in small temporary water pools in such places as hollows in trees, water-filled bromeliad rosettes and bamboo stalks. Here the tadpoles develop and the female periodically deposits unfertilised eggs in the water on which they feed. If there are several tadpoles in any water body, cannibalism may occur.

== Status ==
Lehmann's poison frog is only found in a very small area of Colombia. It is fully protected in its native country, considered critically endangered by the IUCN and listed on CITES Appendix II. Once a common species in its tiny range, recent surveys have found that it is now very rare. Threats to its survival are the degradation of its habitat due to timber extraction and illegal agriculture, and collection for the pet trade. It is present in the Parque Nacional Natural Farallones de Cali. In an attempt of countering the continued illegal collection of wild individuals, a farm that breeds this species and other Colombian poison frogs in captivity has been started in Colombia, both providing legal frogs for the pet market (instead of illegal wild caught) and an income for the local community.

== Predators and threats ==
There is a possible overexploitation for pet trade and habitat destruction due to deforestation and agriculture. The commerce in wildlife and the keeping of wild animals as pets are two factors in the worldwide decline of biodiversity. The introduction of invasive species, the overexploitation of wild populations, and the spread of infectious illnesses have all been connected to the trade in amphibians. Because of their appealing aposematic coloring and diurnal habits, poison frogs are among the most popular amphibians to be kept in captivity. Early in the 1970s, aquarium hobbyists in Germany and the Netherlands were the first to commercially sell poison frogs, along with tropical species exported from South America. As the pet reptile business grew, English-language literature detailing the management of poison frogs in captivity started to appear in the middle of the 1980s.

The family Dendrobatidae was added to The Convention on International Trade in Endangered Species of Wild Fauna and Flora in 1987 due to growing demand and concerns that over collection could reduce wild populations. However, at that time, there were only 100 documented poison frog keepers in the United States. Between 50,000 and 100,000 persons are thought to maintain poison frogs in the United States today; many of them are domestically developed to satisfy demand. Simultaneously, private collectors in the United States and Europe generally agree that many regularly preserved poison frogs were first obtained illegally.

== Behavior ==
=== Reproduction ===
Males locate suitable locations to store eggs (close to water and away from predators) as soon as the rainy season ends, and they use a series of sounds to entice females. After selecting a male, the female lays a few big eggs on leaves in the spot the male has chosen, around 1.2 meters above the forest floor. In order to ensure the eggs' survival, the male fertilizes them and tends to them. To make sure the eggs get adequate air, he rotates them every so often. After fertilization, the male carries the eggs on his back for two to four weeks using a sticky mucus. Since the tadpoles are cannibalistic, he transports them all to separate locations. It takes 2 to 3 months for tadpoles to develop into adults. Oophaga lehmanni can breed successfully with Oophaga histrionicus in captivity. Other than its lack of histrionicotoxins, O. lehmanni does not vary from O. histrionicus and so its status as a distinct species has often been questioned.

=== Social behavior ===
Small-scale deforestation can modify habitat in two ways that directly impact conspecific communication. First, male calling behavior may eventually become unsustainable because to the known higher temperatures and radiation levels in human-made gaps compared to other forest areas. This is due to the fact that males would be more exposed under deteriorated settings, which increases the risk of overheating and higher evaporative water loss. In the medium to long term, males would not be able to dedicate as much time to attracting females and announcing territory ownership, which is a behavioral consequence of these physiological stressors.

Second, changes in the amount of light in the forest can also affect an animal's look, which has been shown to be important for some lekking bird species' courtship behavior. Similarly, it has been demonstrated that the detectability of the changing color patterns in D. tinctorius varies according on whether they are observed under an open or closed canopy. Although the majority of research on this has focused on predator-prey interactions, species for which color patterns influence mate choice or underlie behavioral variations like boldness or aggression may find these differences in detectability in response to light environment especially pertinent. Crucially, modification of the ecosystem by humans may impact not only the light environment but also the forest floor's structure, which may change detectability and visual contrast and potentially interfere with conspecifics' ability to communicate.

Moreover, because the color of poison frogs is partially determined by carotenoid pigments obtained through feeding, variations in the availability of prey due to habitat disturbances may also affect an individual's color. Actually, a number of studies have demonstrated that feeding frogs high levels of carotenoids can cause color changes and improve the frogs' ability to reproduce. Therefore, variations in the availability of prey may have an impact on the consumption of carotenoids or their precursors, which may then have an impact on infraspecific communication. This is especially true in species where, as previously noted, coloration plays a significant role in mate selection.
