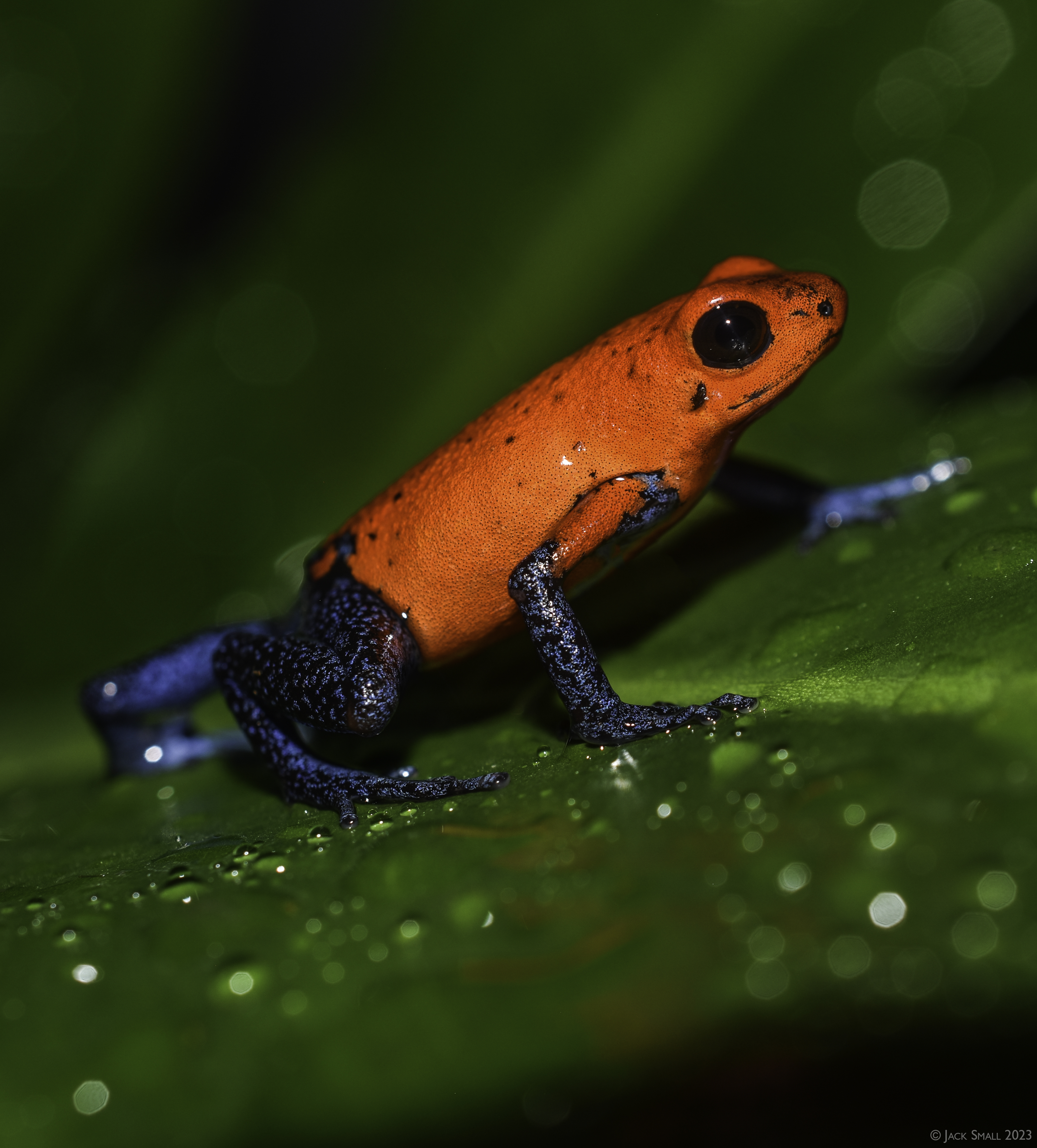
- Oophaga pumilio

Scientific classification
- Kingdom: Animalia
- Phylum: Chordata
- Class: Amphibia
- Order: Anura
- Family: Dendrobatidae
- Subfamily: Dendrobatinae
- Genus: Oophaga; Bauer, 1994

Type species
- Dendrobates pumilio Schmidt, 1857

Diversity
- 12 species (see text)

= Oophaga =

Genus of amphibians

Oophaga is a genus of poison-dart frogs containing twelve species, many of which were formerly placed in the genus Dendrobates. The frogs are distributed in Central and South America, from Nicaragua south through the El Chocó to northern Ecuador (at elevations below 1,200 m (3,900 ft)). Their habitats vary with some species being arboreal while other being terrestrial, but the common feature is that their tadpoles are obligate egg feeders. Most species in this genus are seriously threatened and O. speciosa is already extinct.

== Etymology ==
Oophaga, from Ancient Greek ᾠόν (ōión), meaning "egg", and φάγος (phágos), meaning "eater", is descriptive of the tadpoles' diet.

== Reproduction ==
While presumably all dendrobatids show parental care, this is unusually advanced in Oophaga: the tadpoles feed exclusively on trophic (unfertilized) eggs supplied as food by the mother; the father is not involved. Through the eggs, the mother also passes defensive toxins to the tadpoles: Oophaga pumilio tadpoles experimentally fed with eggs from alkaloid-free frogs did not contain alkaloids.

== Species ==
There are twelve species in this genus:

11 are extant, one is recently extinct.

Image	Scientific name	Common name	Distribution
	Oophaga anchicayensis (Posso-Terranova and Andrés, 2018)		Chocó region of northwestern Colombia
	Oophaga andresi (Posso-Terranova and Andrés, 2018)	Cocorro	Colombia
	Oophaga arborea (Myers, Daly, and Martínez, 1984)	Polkadot poison frog	Panama
	Oophaga granulifera (Taylor, 1958)	Granular poison frog	Costa Rica and Panama
	Oophaga histrionica (Berthold, 1845)	Harlequin poison frog	El Chocó region of western Colombia
	Oophaga lehmanni (Myers and Daly, 1976)	Lehmann's poison frog	western Colombia
	Oophaga occultator (Myers and Daly, 1976)	La Brea poison frog	Cordillera Occidental in the Cauca Department of Colombia
	Oophaga pumilio (Schmidt, 1857)	Strawberry poison-dart frog	eastern central Nicaragua through Costa Rica and northwestern Panama
	Oophaga solanensis (Posso-Terranova and Andrés, 2018)	Koe-koe	Northwestern region of Colombia, on the western banks of the Atrato and san Juan rivers
	Oophaga speciosa (Schmidt, 1857)	Splendid poison frog	Cordillera de Talamanca, western Panama (extinct)
	Oophaga sylvatica (Funkhouser, 1956)	Diablito poison frog	southwestern Colombia and northwestern Ecuador.
	Oophaga vicentei (Jungfer, Weygoldt, and Juraske, 1996)	Vicente's poison frog	Veraguas, Bocas del Toro, Colón and Coclé Provinces of central Panama

== Captivity ==
Oophaga may be kept as pets by experienced amphibian keepers, but they are challenging to breed in captivity as only parents can feed and care for tadpoles.
