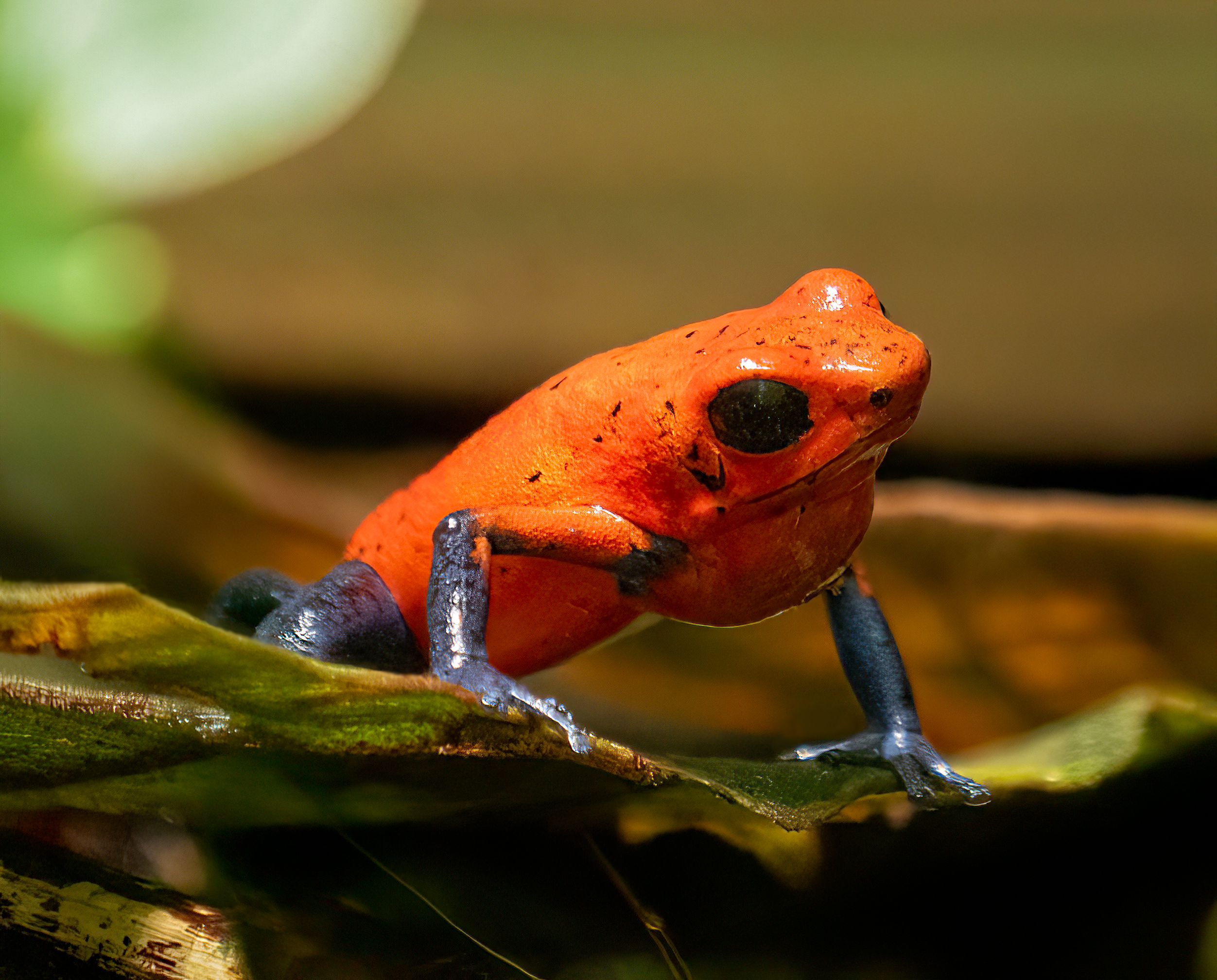

Conservation status
- Least Concern (IUCN 3.1)

Scientific classification
- Kingdom: Animalia
- Phylum: Chordata
- Class: Amphibia
- Order: Anura
- Family: Dendrobatidae
- Genus: Oophaga
- Species: O. pumilio

Binomial name
- Oophaga pumilio (Schmidt, 1857)

Synonyms
- Dendrobates pumilio Schmidt, 1857

= Strawberry poison dart frog =

Species of amphibian

The strawberry poison frog, strawberry poison dart frog or blue jeans poison frog (Oophaga pumilio, formerly Dendrobates pumilio) is a species of small poison dart frog found in Central America. It is common throughout its range, which extends from eastern central Nicaragua through Costa Rica and northwestern Panama. The species is often found in humid lowlands and premontane forest, but large populations are also found in disturbed areas such as plantations. The strawberry poison frog is perhaps most famous for its widespread variation in coloration, comprising approximately 15–30 color morphs, most of which are presumed to be true-breeding. O. pumilio, while not the most poisonous of the dendrobatids, is the most toxic member of its genus.

== Diet ==
The diet of O. pumilio causes the skin of the amphibian to become toxic in nature when certain subspecies of mites and ants are ingested, very similar to many other poison dart frogs. Alkaloid toxins are organic in nature and contain nitrogenous bases that react with carbon and hydrogen groups. Pumiliotoxin 251D is the specialized toxin that is sequestered by this species of frog. This toxin has a negative stimulating effect on cardiac function and is a severe disruptor of the sodium potassium ion channels within cells. Upon ingestion of pumiliotoxin 251D, organisms preying on O. pumilio experience convulsions, paralysis, and death.

It has been found that once O. pumilio reaches sexual maturity, their granular glands significantly increase in size and their diet shifts. In females, it is common to find about 53% more alkaloids than adult males.

Oribatida mites belonging to the glandulate suborder Brachypylina are an important origin of pumiliotoxins in O. pumilio. Hexane-extraction techniques indicate presence of alkaloid toxins in Brachypylina. Toxins appear to be biosynthesized in adult mites, as nymph and larval stages of the arachnid do not carry the toxins. Experimental analysis of this species of mite show alkaloid toxins are found almost exclusively in the opisthonotal glands of mites of the Scheloribatidae. Oil glands of the mite contain the toxins and are then released internally as the amphibian digests the arthropod.

Oophaga pumilio can also attribute its cutaneous toxicity to its rich diet of formicinae ants. Species of the formicine genus Brachymyrmex contain pumiliotoxins which the frogs incorporate and accumulate poison from. There is a variability of alkaloid profiles among populations and individuals of O. pumilio, which is indicative of varying levels of available prey within their infraspecific habitats. Research and physical analysis reveal that maternally derived alkaloids exist in young tadpoles. The increase in alkaloids in tadpoles suggests that the females are providing more chemical defenses to their more vulnerable young. This being one of the first found examples of provisioning that occurs after hatching. During tadpole-rearing, mother frogs feed their young an unfertilized egg from their ovaries after dropping each individual tadpole into a repository of water usually found in a bromeliad. Tadpoles lacking the obligate nutritive egg diet do not contain the alkaloid. This step is crucial for the tadpoles to sequester the alkaloid from their mother; without such, young tadpoles become susceptible to predation by arthropods and other frogs.

== Behavior ==
Oophaga pumilio is diurnal and primarily terrestrial, and can often be found in leaf litter in both forested and disturbed areas. Studies have shown that the optimal habitat is determined by the male, considering the resource benefits and defense costs. Males tend to expend more energy defending smaller but higher quality areas. There has also been evidence that the better competitors and fighters are the males guarding smaller sites with higher female density. In most Anura the louder the vocalization when competing usually means they are larger in size and in better health. However, in the O. pumilio species researchers have determined that these frogs call out at a lower rate to limit their energetic expenditures. Females, on the other hand, simply distribute themselves according to tadpole rearing sites.

Though brightly colored and toxic, these frogs are relatively small, growing to approximately 17.5–22 mm (0.69–0.87 in) in standard length.

== Reproduction and parental care ==
Listen to a pumilio call
Male advertisement call

Oophaga pumilio is an external breeder, and other species of the genus Oophaga are notable in the amphibian world for exhibiting a high degree of parental care. The strawberry poison frog has dual parental care. The males defend and water the nests, and the females feed the oophagous tadpoles their unfertilized eggs. Although both male and female contribute to parental care, females invest more heavily in terms of energy expenditure, time investment, and loss of potential reproduction. When choosing a partner for mating, females will choose the closest calling male rather than the highest quality male. Females provide energetically costly eggs to the tadpoles for 6–8 weeks (until metamorphosis), remain sexually inactive during tadpole rearing, and care for only one clutch of four to six tadpoles at a time. The males contribute via the relatively "cheap" (in terms of energy) act of watering and protecting the eggs for a relatively short period (10–12 days), and can care for multiple nests at one time. The extreme maternal investment in their offspring is believed to be the result of high egg mortality. Only 5–12% of the clutch develops into tadpoles, so the female's fitness may be best increased by making sure those few eggs that form tadpoles survive.

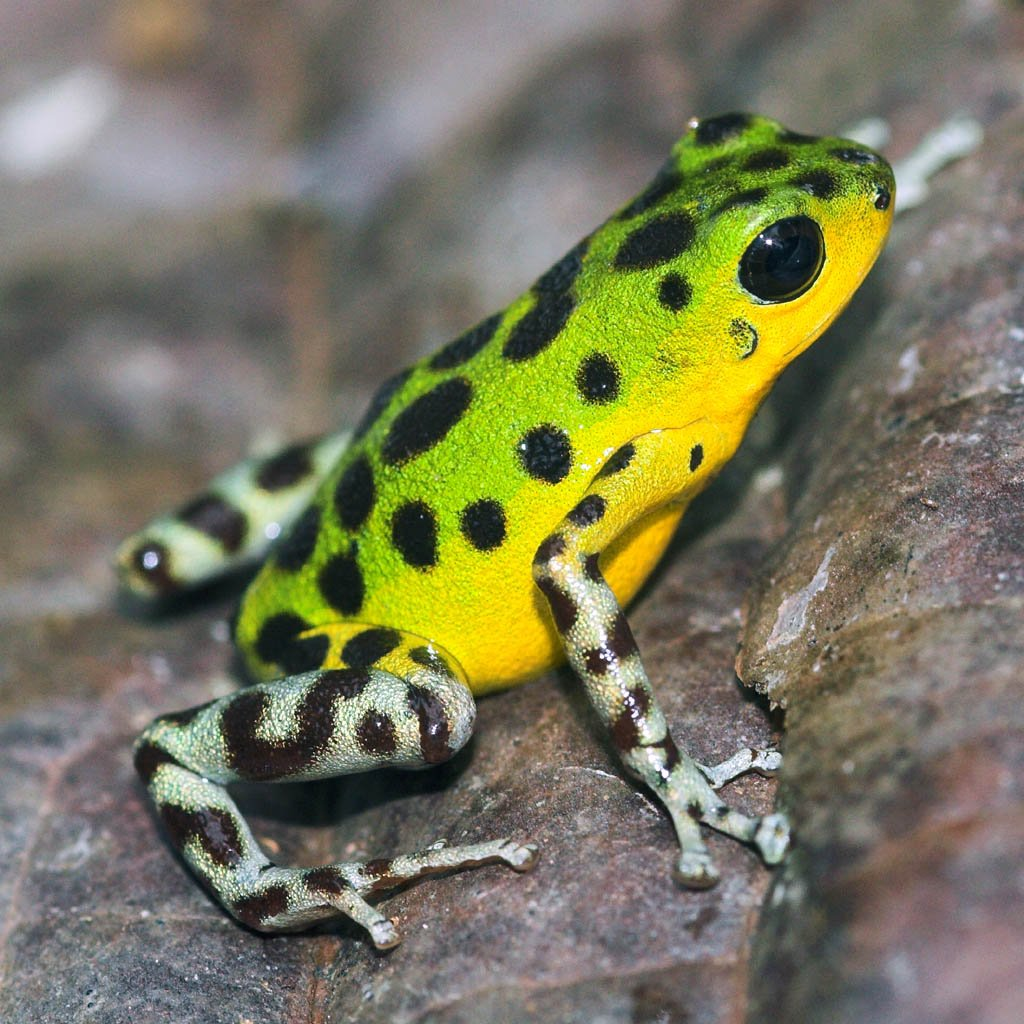
The la gruta morph from Colón Province, Panama

After mating, the female lays three to five eggs on a leaf or bromeliad axil. The male then ensures the eggs are kept hydrated by transporting water in his cloaca. After about 10 days, the eggs hatch and the female transports the tadpoles on her back to some water-filled location. In captivity, on rare occasions, the male is observed transporting the tadpoles, though whether this is intentional, or the tadpoles simply hitch a ride, is unknown. Bromeliad axils are frequently used tadpole deposition sites, but anything suitable can be used, such as knots in trees, small puddles, or human trash such as aluminum cans.

Tadpoles are deposited singly at each location. Once this has been done, the female will come to each tadpole every few days and deposit several unfertilized food eggs. In captivity, tadpoles have been raised on a variety of diets, ranging from algae to the eggs of other dart frogs, but with minimal success. O. pumilio tadpoles are considered obligate egg feeders, as they are unable to accept any other form of nutrition.

After about a month, the tadpole will metamorphose into a small froglet. Generally, it stays near its water source for a few days for protection as it absorbs the rest of its tail.

== Taxonomy ==
Oophaga pumilio belongs to the genus Oophaga, although the name Dendrobates pumilio is still sometimes used. There is evidence that the species of Oophaga (previously classified as the "female parental care group" of Dendrobates) are a monophyletic evolutionary group. Due to the low level of genetic divergence between the species analyzed in this genus, it is estimated that they speciated relatively recently, after the formation of the current Panamanian land bridge in the Pliocene (3–5 million years ago). Oophaga pumilio is believed to be most closely related to O. arborea and O. sylvatica.

== Evolution ==
Strawberry poison frog, O. pumilio, shows extreme variation in color and pattern between populations that have been geographically isolated for more than 10,000 years. When populations are separated by geographic distances and landscape barriers, they frequently experience restricted gene flow, which can enable phenotypic divergence between populations through selection or drift. Their variety in warning coloration is used for their visibility, toxicity and resistance to predators. When divergent phenotypes are mostly restricted to separate islands, the biogeography of color polymorphism suggests a major role for neutral process. However, Summers et al. provide evidence that neutral divergence alone is unlikely to have caused the variation in color patterns. As shown by Lande, rapid evolution in sexually selecting species is led by the interaction of random genetic drift with natural and sexual selection such as random genetic drift in female mating preferences. Color is known to play a role in male–female signaling, mate attraction, and male–male signaling in anurans. Based on Tazzyman and Iwasa's study that involved collections of samples from main islands in the Bocas del Toro archipelago, its results proved that female preference on male calls led to call divergence and therefore divergence was driven by sexual selection. Mate choice plays a critical role in generating and maintaining biodiversity. Furthermore, spatial variation in predators or habitat features could exert divergent natural selection on coloration in response to its subjection to predator selection. It is still unclear to what extent sexual selection has driven the evolution of color morphs rather than reinforcing the reproductive isolation of morphs. In an aposematic organism such as O. pumilio, phylogenetic signal of selection cannot be attributed to female mate choice alone but is quite possible that genetic drift would interact with female color preferences to trigger divergence. Researchers Maan and Cummings had also found that in some cases female O. pumilio preferred male mates that had very different coloration than their own phenotype. In nature, the equality of color through evolution is very unlikely considering the various sensory biases of predators and the different background colors of the environments these frogs inhabit. Due to this variability in color evolution, it is unlikely to say there is superiority of aposematic purpose of color selection in Oophaga. Species such as O. pumilio have been known to thrive and compete very well on disturbed and converted land. With temperatures rising in many different biomes, the success of many species is going to be determined by its ability to acclimate and adapt. In a study done by Rivera-Ordonez and Nowakowski, they discovered that in many cases O. pumilio is experiencing greater temperature stress in converted habitats than forests.

== Habitat niche ==
This frog species utilizes scattered structures throughout disturbed lands to relieve some thermal stress. However, O. pumilio is still warmer than any other species in the forested areas, being exposed to temperatures up to 27 degrees Celsius. These findings suggest that this species of dart frog acts as an ecological buffer and will be more successful than other species as land use changes and temperatures rise.

== Captivity ==
Oophaga pumilio is a popular frog in captivity, due to its striking colors and unique life cycle. They have been imported in vast quantities to the United States and Europe since the early 1990s, when they would typically be available for around US$75 each. However, these shipments have since stopped, and O. pumilio is much less common and available in reduced diversity. A select number of hobbyists and breeders are successfully reproducing these frogs in captivity, and healthy, captive-bred individuals have become much easier to find (in the 21st century).

In Europe, O. pumilio is much more diverse due to an increased frequency of smuggling and the resulting offspring of smuggled animals. Smuggling of dart frogs is less common elsewhere, but is still a large problem as it kills large numbers of animals and often degrades or destroys viable habitat.

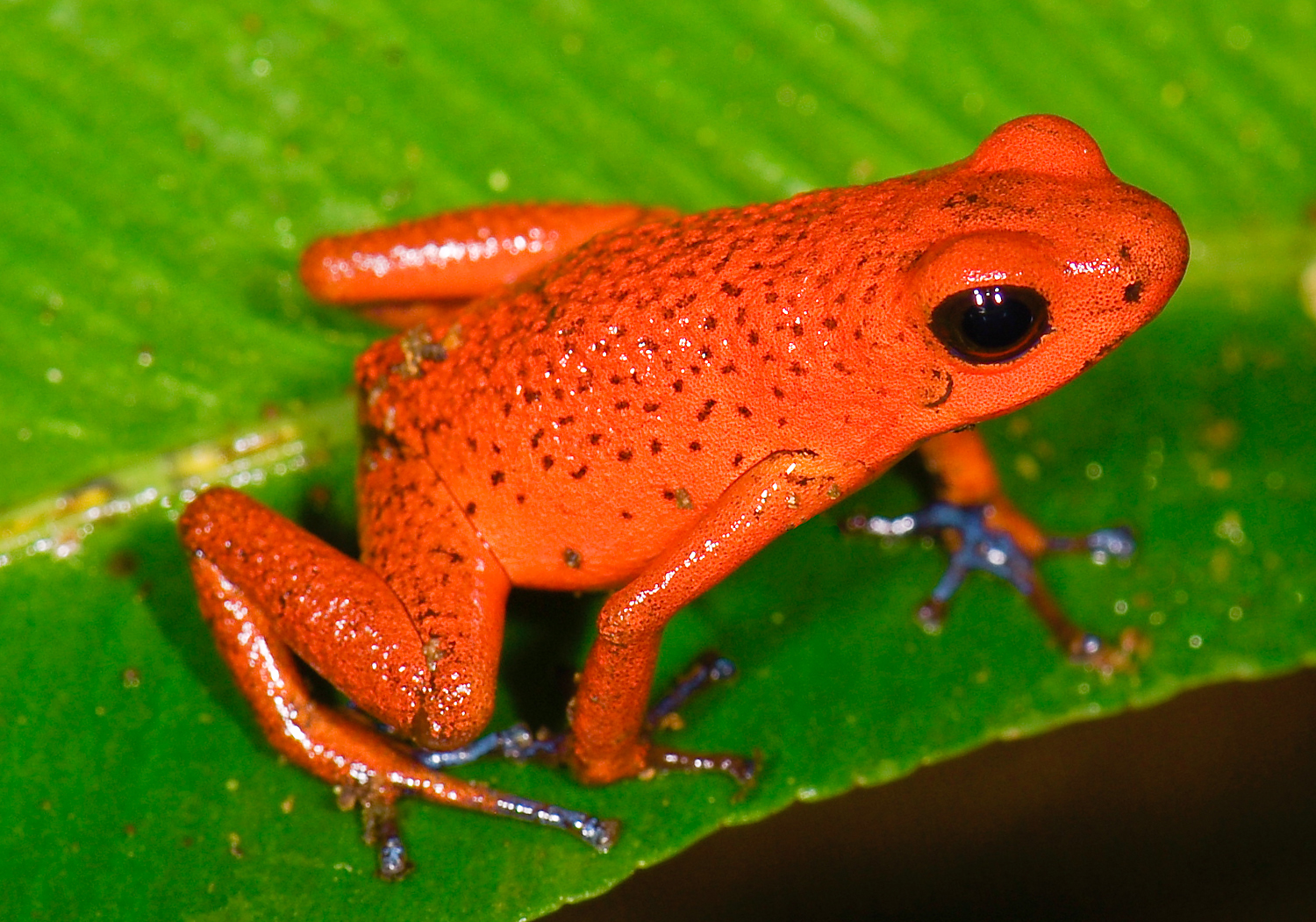
Strawberry poison-dart frog in Costa Rica

Recently, O. pumilio has been exported from Central America again in small numbers from frog farms. Because of this, they have seen a huge increase in numbers in the dart frog community and are regularly available.

=== Common color morphs in captivity ===
One example of a color morph is the blue jeans morph. It is most common throughout the species range, but is relatively rare in the United States pet trade. Most of these animals came from imports during the 1990s, or are their descendants. As of 2003, it was observed that this morph could be found throughout Costa Rica, as well as mainland Panama.

Another documented geographic variant of O. pumilio occurs in the Punta Laurel area of the Bocas del Toro region of Panama. Populations from this locality are characterized by predominantly green dorsal coloration, with comparatively lighter limbs and ventral surfaces. This phenotype represents one of many locally distinct color forms found within the Bocas del Toro archipelago, where pronounced color polymorphism is associated with geographic isolation and selective pressures on coloration.
