= Oophaga andresi =

Conservation status
- Endangered (IUCN 3.1)

Scientific classification
- Kingdom: Animalia
- Phylum: Chordata
- Class: Amphibia
- Order: Anura
- Family: Dendrobatidae
- Genus: Oophaga
- Species: O. andresi

Binomial name
- Oophaga andresi Posso-Terranova and Andrés, 2018

Species of frog

Oophaga andresi, also known as the cocorro, is a species of poison dart frog. It was described in 2018. It is endemic to Colombia's Chocó region.

== Habitat ==
This terrestrial frog lives in lowland rainforests with considerable humidity and precipitation, over 7000 mm per year. This frog has been observed between 55 and 450 meters above sea level.

== Reproduction ==
The male frogs choose breeding territories and perch approximately 2 m above the ground to call to the females. The male frog sits on something high, about 2 m above the ground, and calls to the female frogs. After the eggs hatch, the female frog carries the tadpoles to pools of water in bromeliad plants. The female frog lays unfertilized eggs for the tadpoles to eat.

== Threats ==
The IUCN classifies this frog as endangered because of its small range, ongoing habitat loss, and illegal capture for the international wildlife trade. People cut down forest for agriculture, including illegal palm cultivation, gold mining, and cattle ranching.

For many years, Colombia's civil war prevented poachers from harvesting this frog. But because the government has made peace with the guerrillas, some poaching has resumed. Smugglers purchase the frogs from locals for about US$3 each, but they can sell them in North America for $1000 each. Because the frogs are difficult to breed in captivity, poachers harvest new ones annually.

Scientists have observed the fungus Batrachochytrium dendrobatidis on this frog in some parts of its range but not others. Batrachochytrium dendrobatidis causes the lethal fungal sickness chytridiomycosis.

== Original description ==
- Posso-Terranova A.; Andrés J. (2018). "Multivariate species boundaries and conservation of harlequin poison frogs". Molecular Ecology (Abstract). 27 (17): 3432–3451. Bibcode:2018MolEc..27.3432P. doi:10.1111/mec.14803. PMID 30033565.
