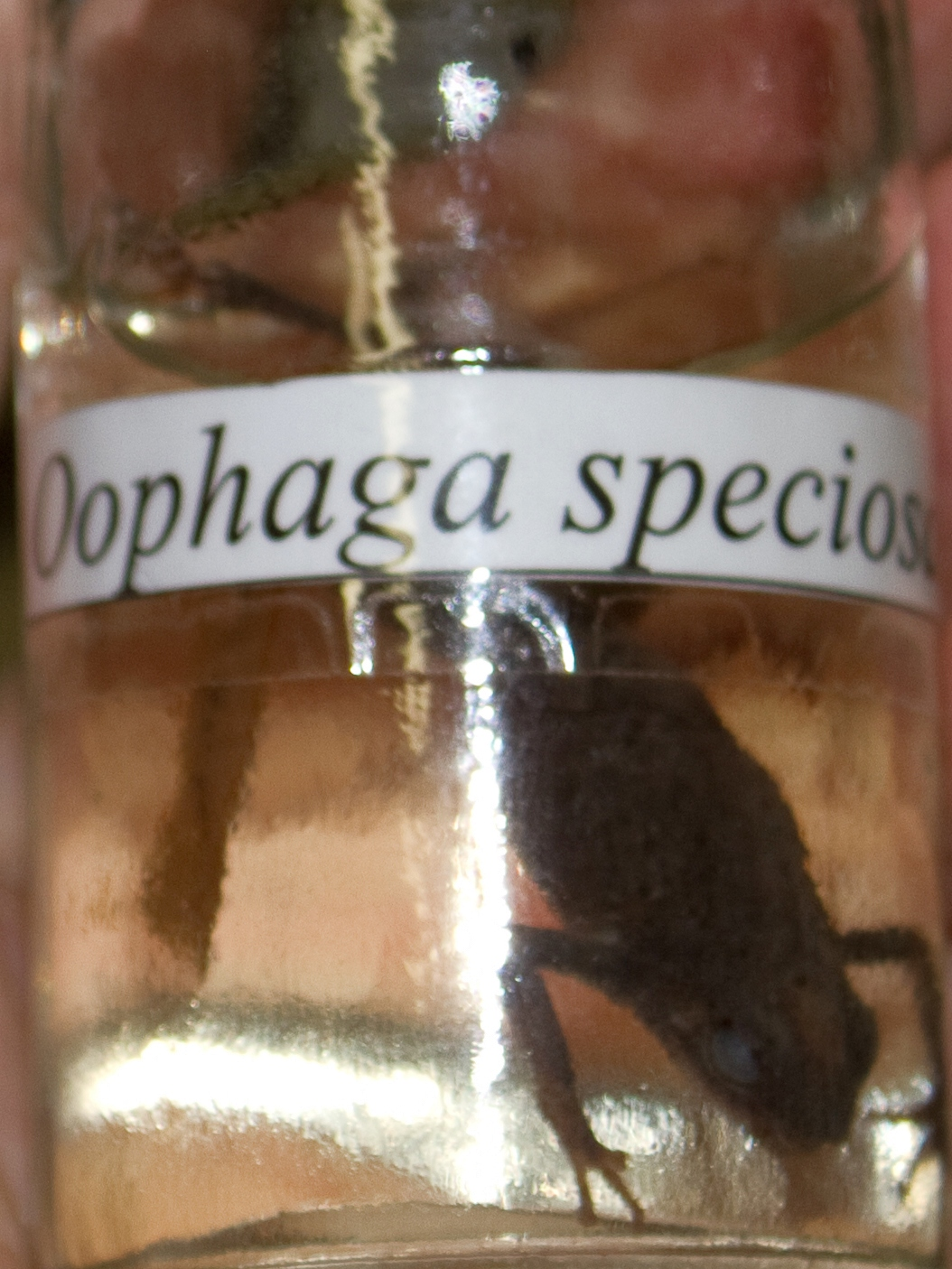
- Museum specimen (in life it was red)

Conservation status
- Extinct (1992) (IUCN 3.1)

Scientific classification
- Kingdom: Animalia
- Phylum: Chordata
- Class: Amphibia
- Order: Anura
- Family: Dendrobatidae
- Genus: Oophaga
- Species: †O. speciosa

Binomial name
- †Oophaga speciosa (Schmidt, 1857)

Synonyms
- Dendrobates speciosus Schmidt, 1857

= Splendid poison frog =

Species of amphibian

The splendid poison frog (Oophaga speciosa) is an extinct species of poison dart frog that was endemic to the eastern end of Cordillera de Talamanca, western Panama. Its natural habitats were humid lowland and montane forests.

== Appearance ==
Male and female adult frogs measured 28–31 mm in snout-vent length. This frog was bright red in color.

== Habitat ==
This frog inhabited in cloud forests in the western Panama's Cordillera de Talamanca. It was diurnal and terrestrial. This frog was observed between 1140 and 1410 meters above sea level.

== Life cycle ==
The male frogs fought each other for good foraging and egg deposition sites.

The female frog cared for the eggs and tadpoles. She laid eggs on leaf litter. After they hatched, she carried the tadpoles to small pools of water that collect in plant leaves other parts. The female frog laid unfertilized eggs for the tadpoles to eat.

== Extinction ==
The species was formerly common in its small range, but is now classified as extinct. Scientists cite the amphibian chytrid fungus that spread through in the region in 1996, a few years after the last recorded sighting of the splendid poison frog in 1992. Despite several comprehensive surveys in its range in subsequent decades, the species (which was easily visible and diurnal) has not been relocated and it was officially declared extinct in 2020.

Because so many frogs were harvested for the international pet trade, scientists believe it may be possible that some remain alive in captivity.
