= Little Rock Zoo =

Zoo in Little Rock, Arkansas, United States

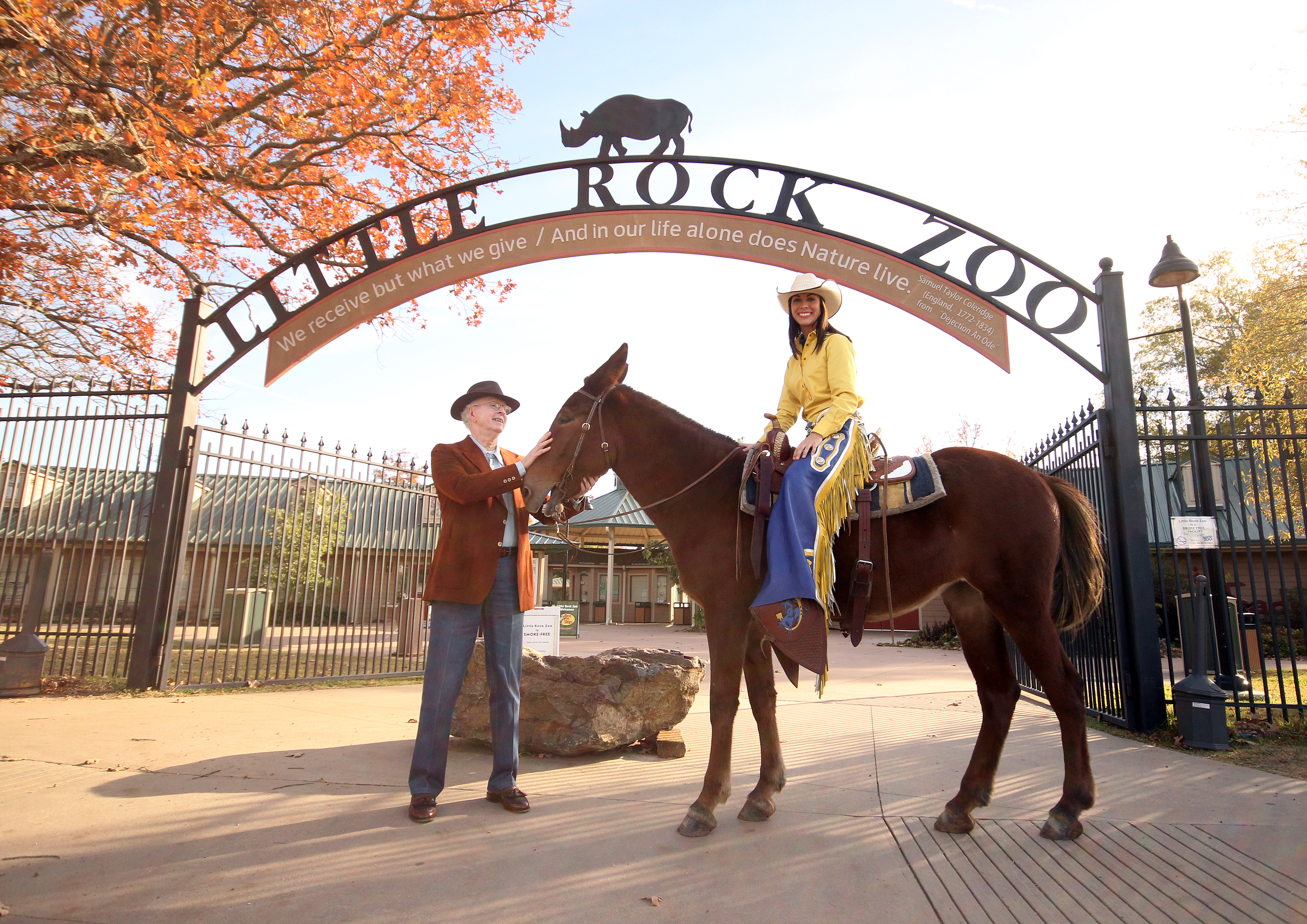
- Little Rock Zoo Entrance
- Interactive map of Little Rock Zoo
- 34.7464°N 92.3321°W
- Date opened: 1926
- Location: Little Rock, Arkansas, United States
- Land area: 33 acres (13 ha)
- No. of animals: 725
- No. of species: 200
- Annual visitors: 307,437
- Memberships: AZA
- Website: http://www.littlerockzoo.com

The Little Rock Zoo was founded in 1924 and is located in Little Rock, Arkansas, United States. It is home to more than 400 animals representing over 200 species, and covers an area of 33 acres (13 ha). The Arkansas Zoological Foundation is a private 501 c (3) organization that raises funds for zoo development. The Little Rock Zoo is a department of the city of Little Rock. It is the largest zoo in Arkansas, and the only Arkansas zoo accredited by the Association of Zoos and Aquariums (AZA).

== History ==
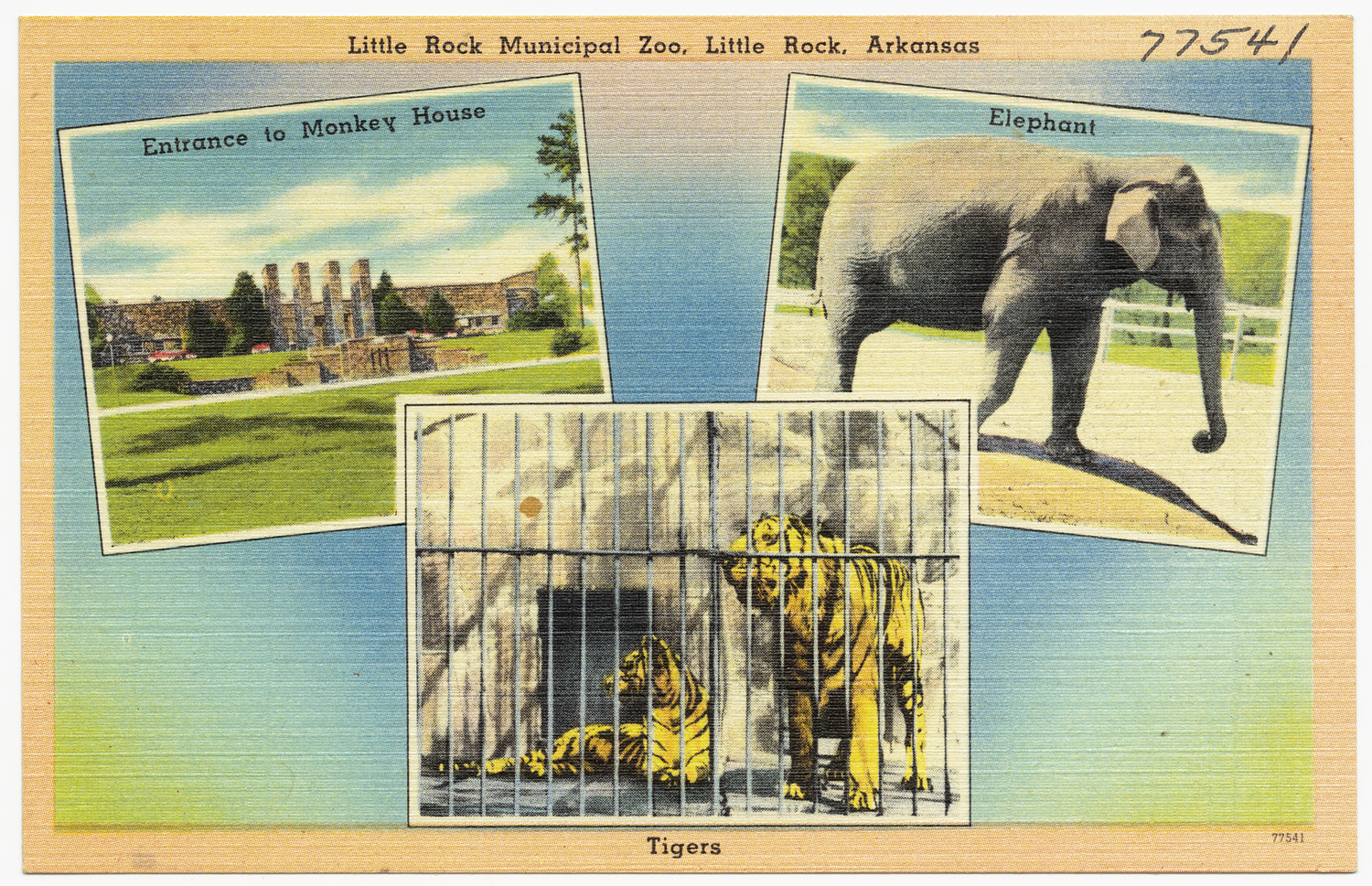
Little Rock Municipal Zoo, c. 1930-1945

The Little Rock Zoo was started in 1924 when then Mayor Brickhouse established a zoo commission to begin work creating a municipal zoo. Over the years it has grown to include 400 animals representing more than 200 species.

The first buildings at the zoo were made of local stone and built by the Works Progress Administration (WPA). These buildings were built in the 1930s and were home to primates, reptiles, birds, and big cats. They are still in use, and the cat house was renovated into a restaurant with the feel of an African style lodge. The big cat exhibit was built in the 1980s along with other exhibits for great apes, crocodiles, alligators, sloth bears, and river otters.

Lemur Island opened in the 1990s, and an African Lion Exhibit was also added at this time, as well as the Civitan Pavilion for special events and the Civitan Amphitheater for educational programming. The zoo acquired a children's farm with an interactive contact yard and train station. In 2001 the board of directors approved a new Zoo Master Plan, which included a new African Veldt Exhibit. The newly restored Over the Jumps carousel, a fully restored antique carousel, made its home at the Little Rock Zoo in the October 2007. An African penguin exhibit, Laura P. Nichols Penguin Pointe, opened on March 5, 2011. The Laura P. Nichols Cheetah Outpost opened on July 7, 2012. The Arkansas Heritage Farm opened on April 2, 2016. The Zoo added the Conservation Learning Center in 2020 and a new Colobus habitat and serval habitat in 2021.

== Exhibits ==
The Little Rock Zoo is divided into themed areas where the animals can be viewed. Some exhibits are based on the animal's natural environment, while others group similar animals together.

- ZOO ENTRANCE

The entrance to the zoo includes the "Over-The-Jumps" Carousel, the Animal Shows Amphitheater, and Lorikeet Landing, where visitors can see and feed rainbow lorikeets.

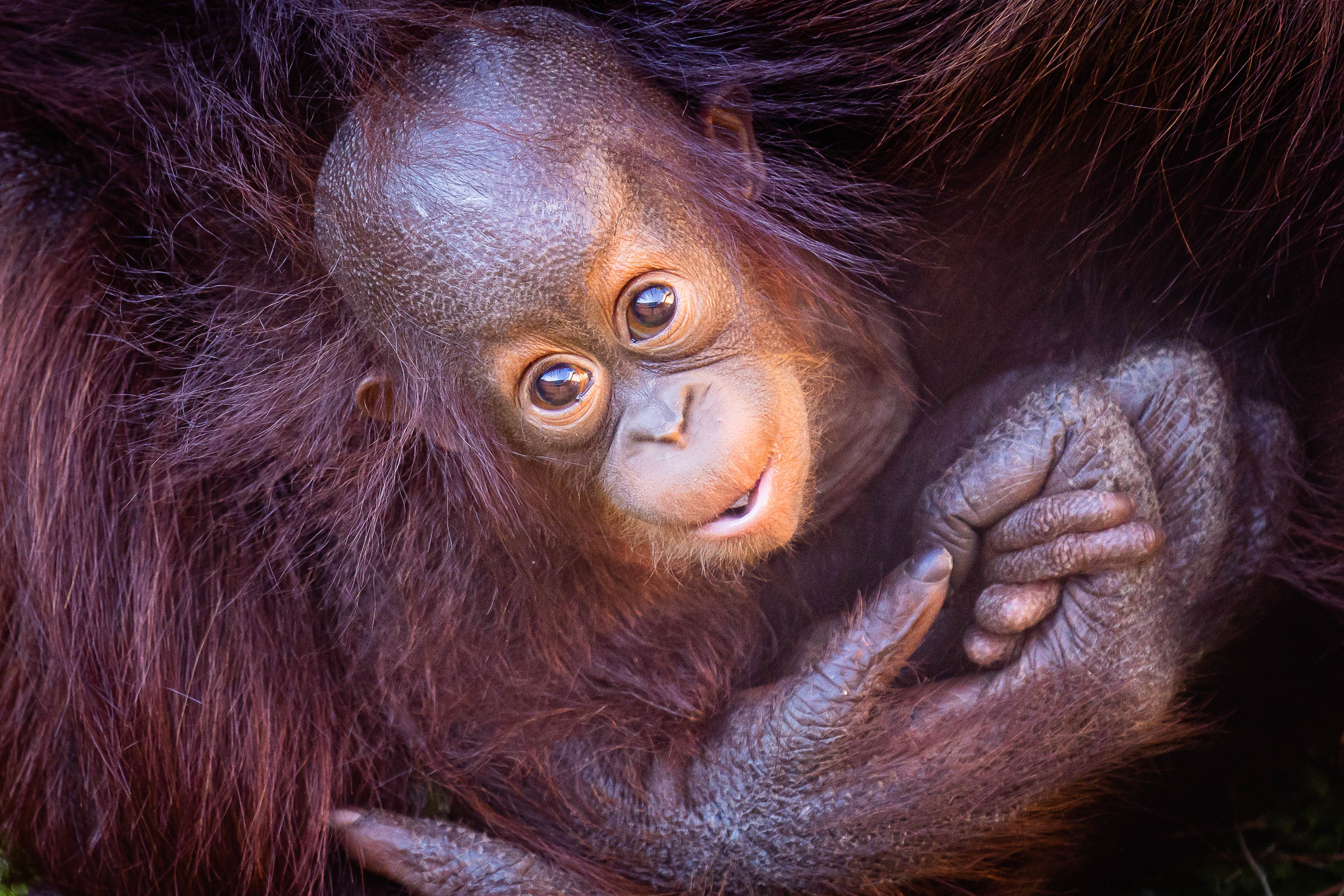
- Baby orangutan with mother in January 2020 at Little Rock Zoo
  GREAT APES

The Great Apes exhibit includes a walkway that allows the visitors to have an eagle's eye view of the ape's enclosures. A western lowland gorilla family group can be seen on one side of the walkway and the chimpanzee and the Bornean orangutan can be seen on the other, both in their own separate enclosures. Outside of this exhibit, various primate islands can be found that are home to the ring-tailed lemur, black-and-white ruffed lemur, blue-eyed black lemur and black-handed spider monkey.

- LAURA P. NICHOLS PENGUIN POINTE

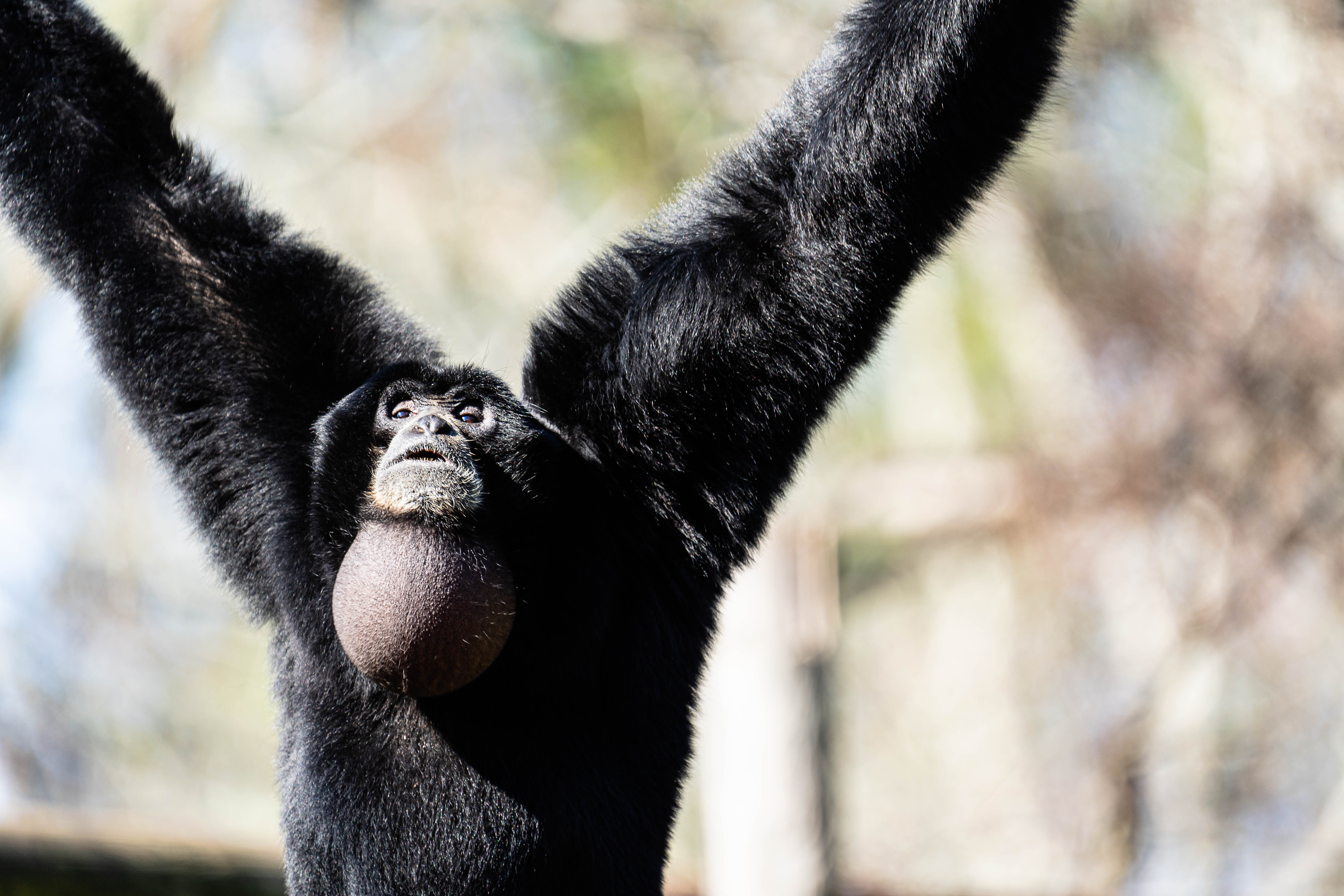
Siamang singing at Little Rock Zoo

Laura P. Nichols Penguin Pointe houses the African penguin and mimics an African shoreline, specifically Boulders Beach, with viewing of the penguins both above and below the water.

- Primates, Reptiles, Birds, & More

The Primates, Reptiles, Birds & More building was built in 1936 and features many exotic animals from around the world, including ones from the primate, reptile, and bird families.

Reptile House

Snakes - red spitting cobra, garden tree boa, puff adder, pine snake, eastern copperhead, pygmy rattlesnake, rock rattlesnake, eastern diamondback rattlesnake, cottonmouth, black rat snake, corn snake, mole snake, Asiatic rock python, green tree python, reticulated python, Burmese python, Mexican burrowing python, eastern indigo snake, milk snake, white-lipped tree viper, Gaboon viper, eyelash viper, Philippine pit viper, eastern kingsnake and Taylor's cantil.

Other Reptiles

American alligator, blue-tongued skink, Madagascar giant day gecko, leopard gecko, tokay gecko, Gila monster, scheltopusik, frilled-neck lizard, Sudan plated lizard, Kuhl's flying gecko, Solomon Islands skink, green iguana, red tegu, plumed basilisk, collared lizard, common snakeneck turtle, spiny softshell turtle, African spurred tortoise, alligator snapping turtle, and three-toed box turtle.

Amphibians

African bullfrog, Chuxiong fire-bellied newt, dyeing poison dart frog, green and black poison dart frog, Oriental fire-bellied toad, tiger salamander, White's tree frog and yellow-banded poison dart frog.

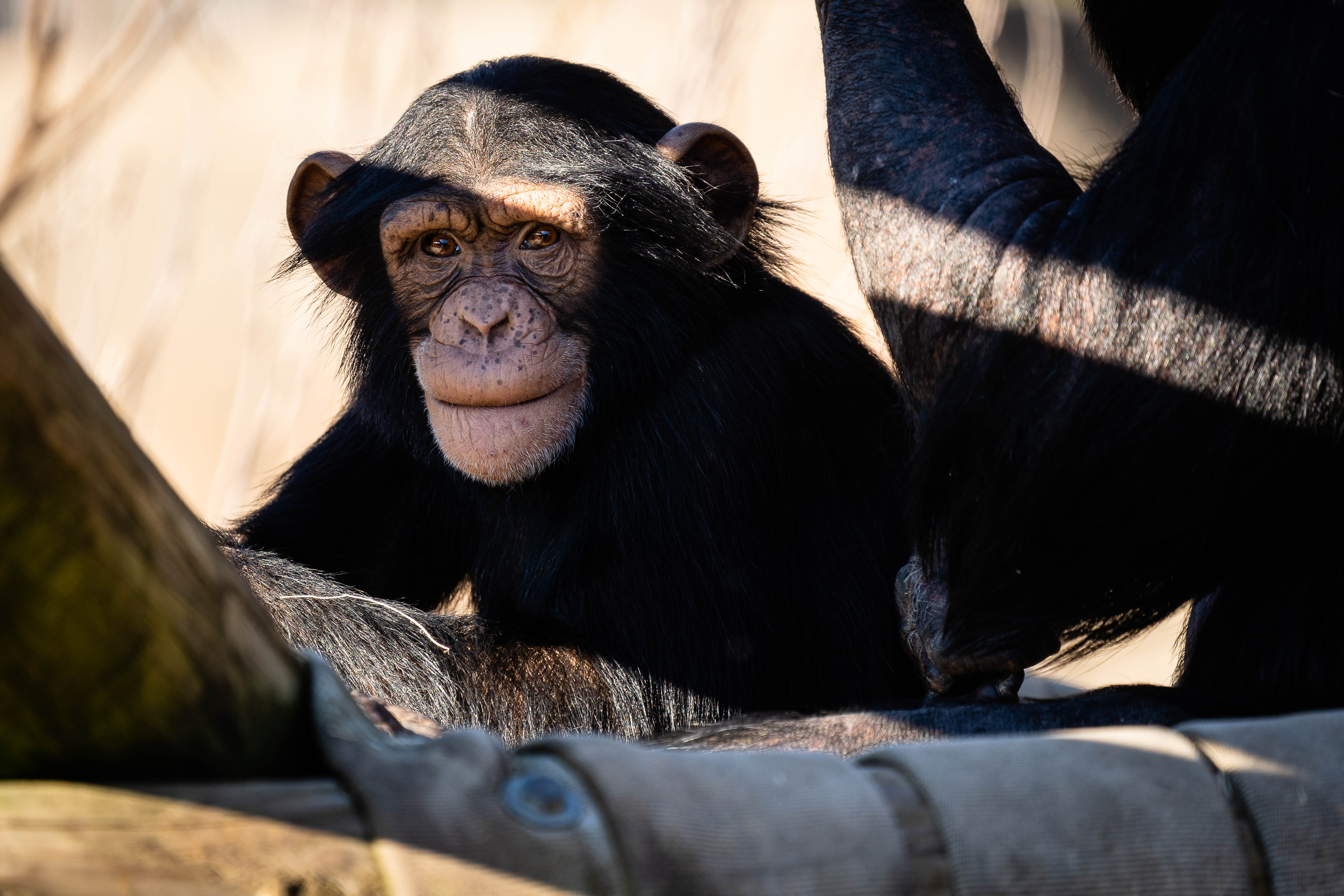
Young chimpanzee at LR Zoo

Invertebrates

Asian forest scorpion, Brazilian cockroach and Chilean rose tarantula.

Primate House

Geoffrey's marmoset, Goeldi's monkey, lesser spot-nosed guenon, Mohol bushbaby, pygmy slow loris, southern three-banded armadillo, tufted capuchin and white-faced saki.

Tropical Bird House

Roseate spoonbill, scarlet ibis, black-naped fruit dove, grey peacock-pheasant, red junglefowl, Scheepmaker's crowned pigeon, Nicobar pigeon, mandarin duck, Madagascar teal, marbled teal, ruddy shelduck and the green aracari.

- Asian Elephants

The elephant exhibit is home to the zoo's Asian elephants. The elephant exhibit is extremely large in order to house these gigantic animals. The elephants also have a large stretch of yard to walk around in outside. There is a large viewing window for the visitors in the front and large banners on the sides that have famous quotes from notable figures citing the majesty and importance of elephants.

- Arkansas Heritage Farm

The Arkansas Heritage Farm exhibit features the Arkansas' Diamond Express train as well as a chicken yard for the araucana, Barred Rock, silkie, Polish crested chicken, salmon faverolles chicken, red junglefowl, wild turkey, Toulouse goose, and the Sebastopol goose. The farm's barn houses the mammals of this exhibit. The donkey, and miniature horse are located on the left side of the barn, followed by the pygmy goat, and baby doll sheep. This exhibit also has a Ringtail habitat, a butterfly garden, and a viewing area for the Aldabra giant tortoise and spur-thighed tortoise. This exhibit is located next to the waterfowl pond where the bar-headed goose, Canada goose, and Chilean flamingo can be found.

- Small Carnivores

The Small Carnivores exhibit features the red fox from North America, the caracal from Africa, the fossa from Madagascar, the ocelot from South America, and the clouded leopard and Reeve's muntjac from Asia.

- Bears

The North American river otter and the spotted-necked otter can be seen at the entrance. The first enclosure houses a sloth bear, who is separated from visitors by a moat. The main attraction is the grizzly bear enclosure which has a large glass viewing window in order for people to see the grizzlies up-close. The bush dog and Woodchuck are located at the end of the exhibit.

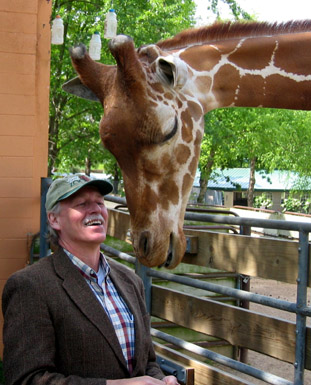
Congressman Vic Snyder visiting the zoo, 2005

- African Savannah

The African Savannah is a mixed species enclosure that features the grey crowned crane, ostrich, blue wildebeests, and Grant's zebras.

- Africa

The Africa exhibit features the eastern black rhinoceros as well as smaller enclosures for Angola colobus and servals.

- Big Cats

The Big Cats exhibit features lions, tigers, Alpacas and jaguars.

- Laura P. Nichols Cheetah Outpost

The Laura P. Nichols Cheetah Outpost exhibit educates visitors about cheetah conservation efforts and African wildlife. Along with the cheetah, Kirk's dik-dik and the blue crane can be seen in front of the outpost. Inside the outpost, the naked mole-rat, Madagascar hissing cockroach, African bullfrog, Angolan python, Standing's day gecko and the Indian crested porcupine.

- OVERLOOK TRAIL

On the Overlook Trail, the maned wolves, Chacoan peccaries, red river hogs, Indian peafowl, Kirk's dik-dik, yellow-backed duiker, giant anteater, white-handed gibbon, siamang, Greater Kudu, Abyssinian ground hornbill and secretarybird can be seen.

== Conservation ==
The Little Rock Zoo participates in the AZA Species Survival Plan (SSP), and has contributed to the survival of many threatened and endangered species.

== Annual Events ==
Wild Wines Zoo Brew GloWILD

== Zoo Master Plan ==
The Little Rock Zoo intends to create a zoogeographic zoo to help the public learn about the habitats and create a more natural zoo for the animals. The included renovations and additions include an Arkansas Farmstead exhibit with native species and information on the importance of agriculture to the state.

Additionally the continent of Asia, which will be located where the Greats Apes exhibit is at present, with a larger elephant exhibit, orangutans, blackbuck antelope, sarus cranes, and other Asian species, the continent of Africa with a new giraffe barn, the African Veldt mixed species exhibit, a new cheetah habitat, the African forest area, and the African Outpost, a new entry complex located north of Zoo Drive complete with a new restaurant, carnival style rides, and an ice cream parlor and a New Discovery Center education center with new rooms, exhibits, and education animals.
