= Rockstone poison dart frog =

Rockstone poison frog

Conservation status
- Data Deficient (IUCN 3.1)
- CITES Appendix II

Scientific classification
- Kingdom: Animalia
- Phylum: Chordata
- Class: Amphibia
- Order: Anura
- Family: Dendrobatidae
- Genus: Dendrobates
- Species: D. nubeculosus

Binomial name
- Dendrobates nubeculosus Jungfer and Böhme, 2004
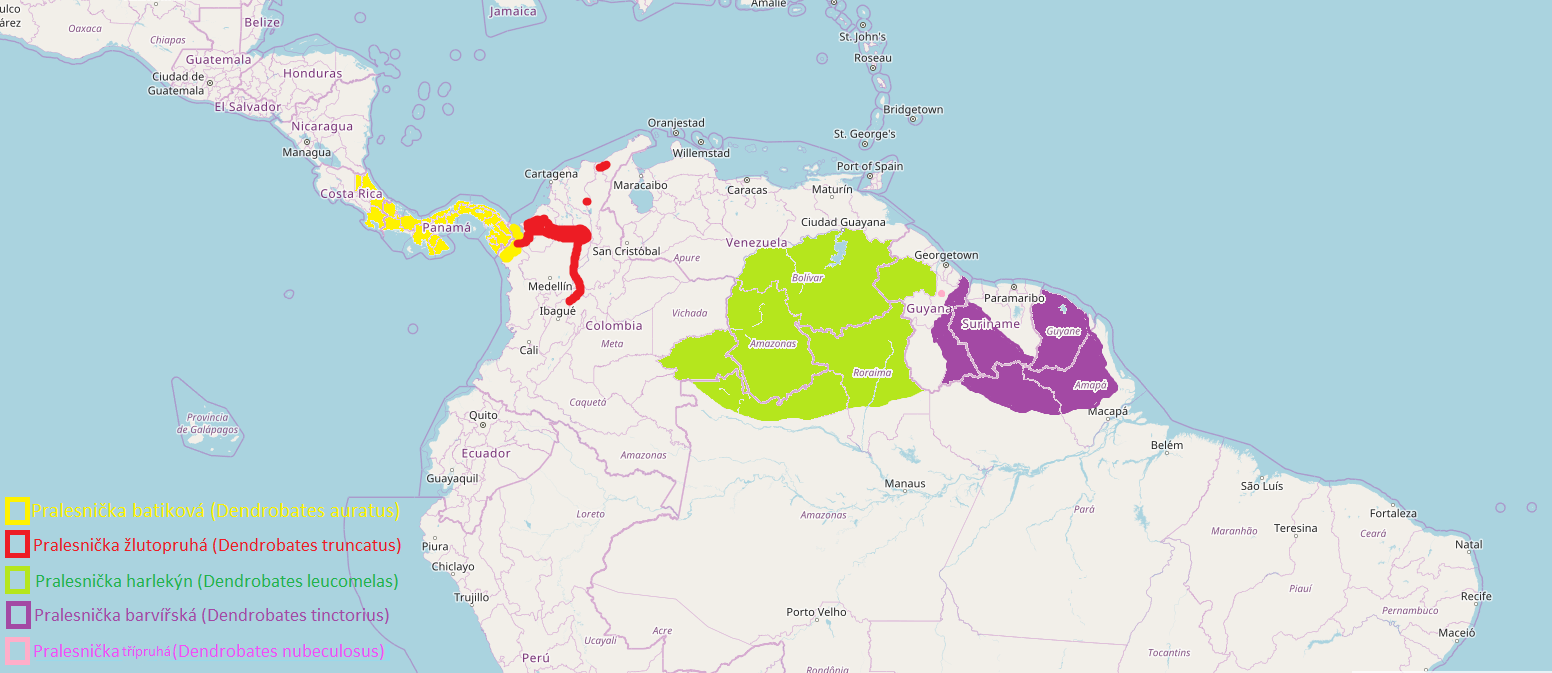
- Distribution of the five Dendrobates species, with D. nubeculosus in pink (spot between D. leucomelas in green and D. tinctorius in purple)

Species of amphibian

The Rockstone poison dart frog (Dendrobates nubeculosus) is a poorly known species of dendrobatid frogs endemic to Guyana. As it is known from only one specimen, very little information is currently available on D. nubeculosus. It has been suggested to be one of the most poorly known species in the world.

== Etymology ==
Scientists gave this frog the English name "Rockstone" because they found it near the town of Rockstone. They gave it the Latin name nebulosus, or "covered in small clouds", presumably for the patterns on its skin.

== Description ==
D. nubeculosus is a small to medium-sized poison dart frog; larger than many of its contemporary Ranitomeya species, but smaller than the other members of the genus Dendrobates. The holotype specimen measures 2.5 centimetres in length, and the species' size range is unknown. It is reasonably certain that, like other members of the genus Dendrobates, D. nubeculosus females are larger than males, but even this is open to speculation. The holotype is primarily black or dark brown, with irregularly shaped blue splotches on the dorsum, and it is mottled blue and black laterally, with a solid black ventral surface. It is unclear whether, as with other Dendrobates species, D. nubeculosus is polymorphic.

Nothing is known about D. nubeculosus' social behaviour, reproductive habits, call, or toxicity. It is assumed that the breeding habits of Dendrobates nubeculosus are similar to that of its sister taxon, D. leucomelas.

== Habitat ==
D. nubeculosus is only known from a single specimen collected by ornithologists in the 1980s. No precise habitat data exist but the vegetation in the area of the type locality, near Rockstone, a town on the Essequibo River, lowland jungle.
