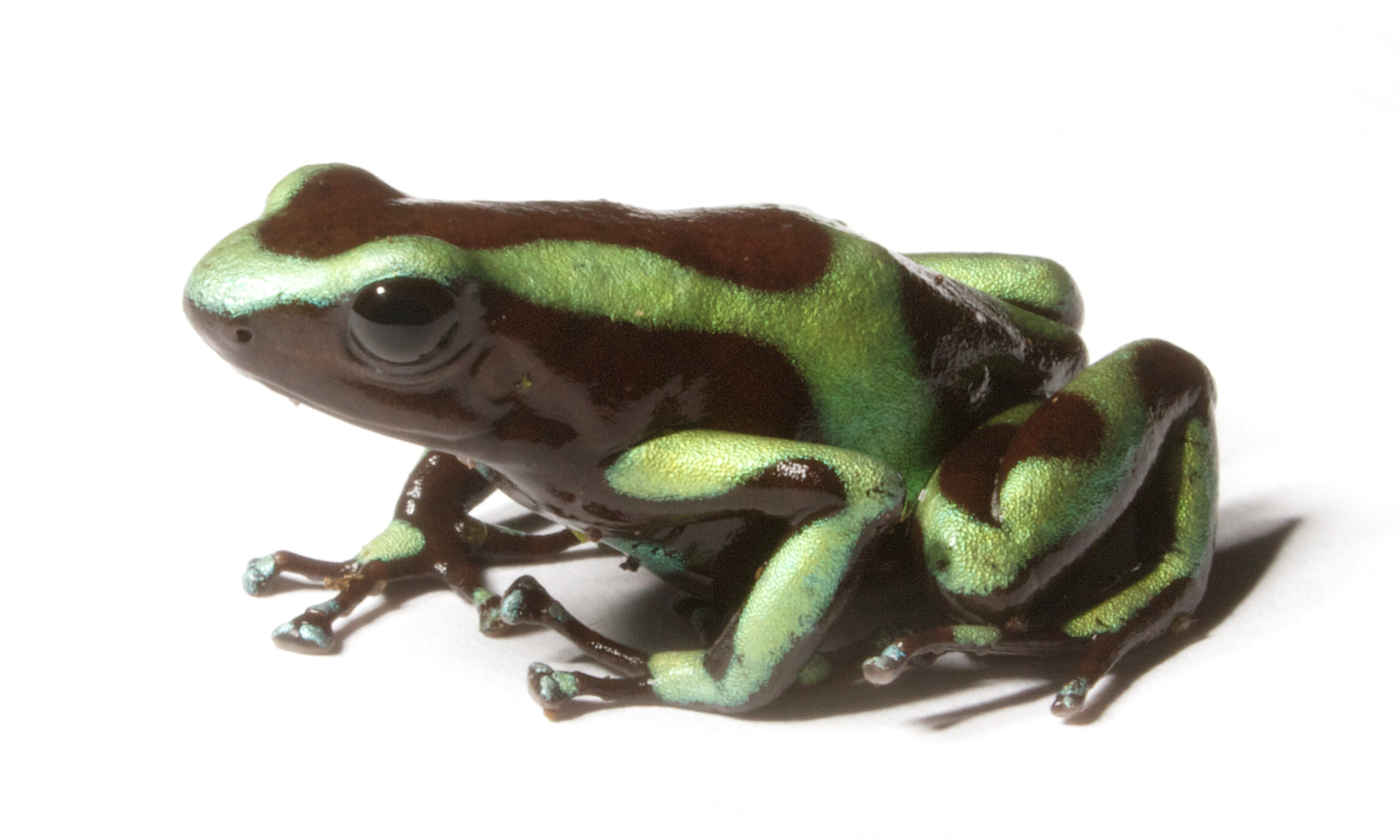

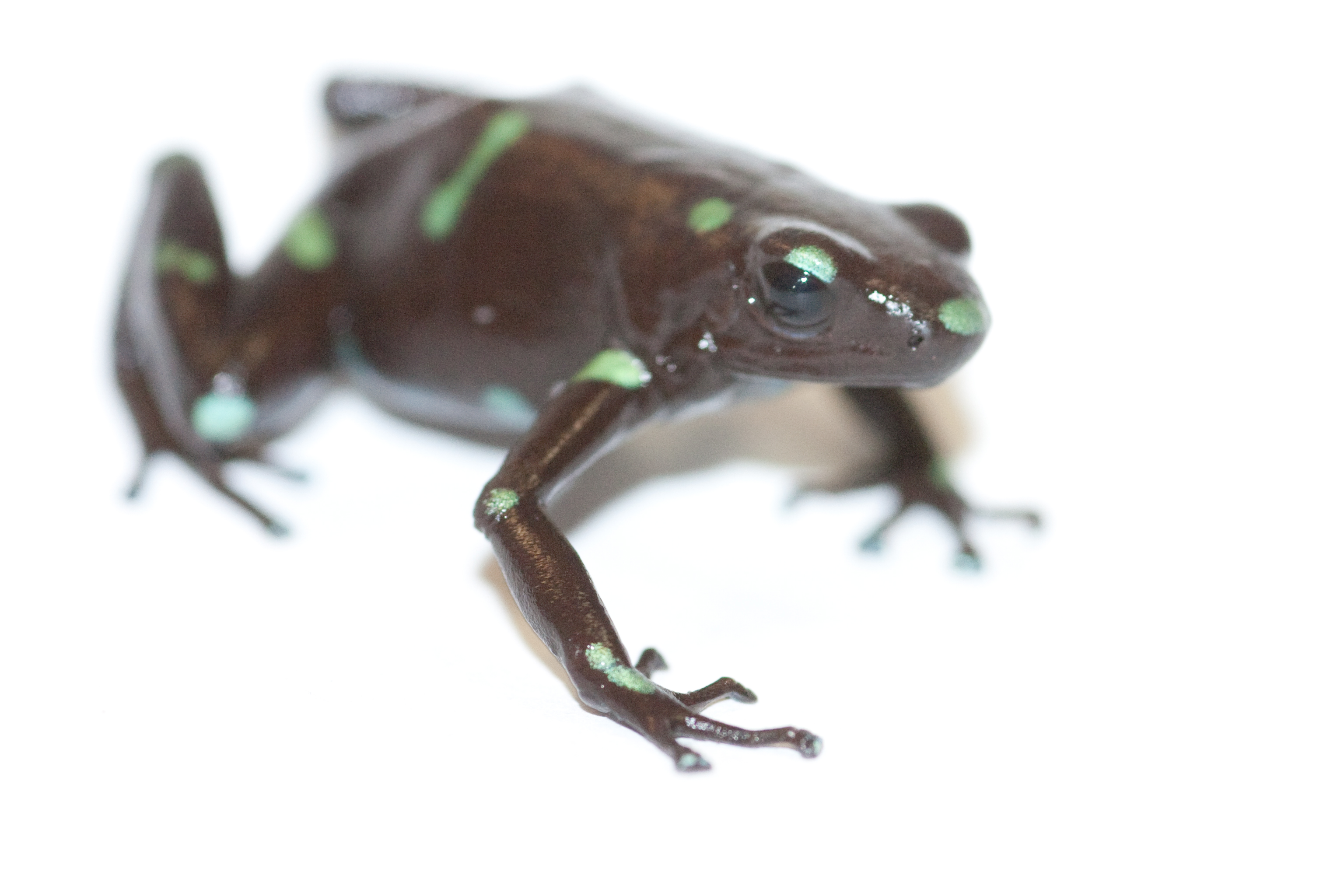
- Two D. auratus from Panama

Conservation status
- Least Concern (IUCN 3.1)
- CITES Appendix II

Scientific classification
- Kingdom: Animalia
- Phylum: Chordata
- Class: Amphibia
- Order: Anura
- Family: Dendrobatidae
- Genus: Dendrobates
- Species: D. auratus

Binomial name
- Dendrobates auratus (Girard, 1855)
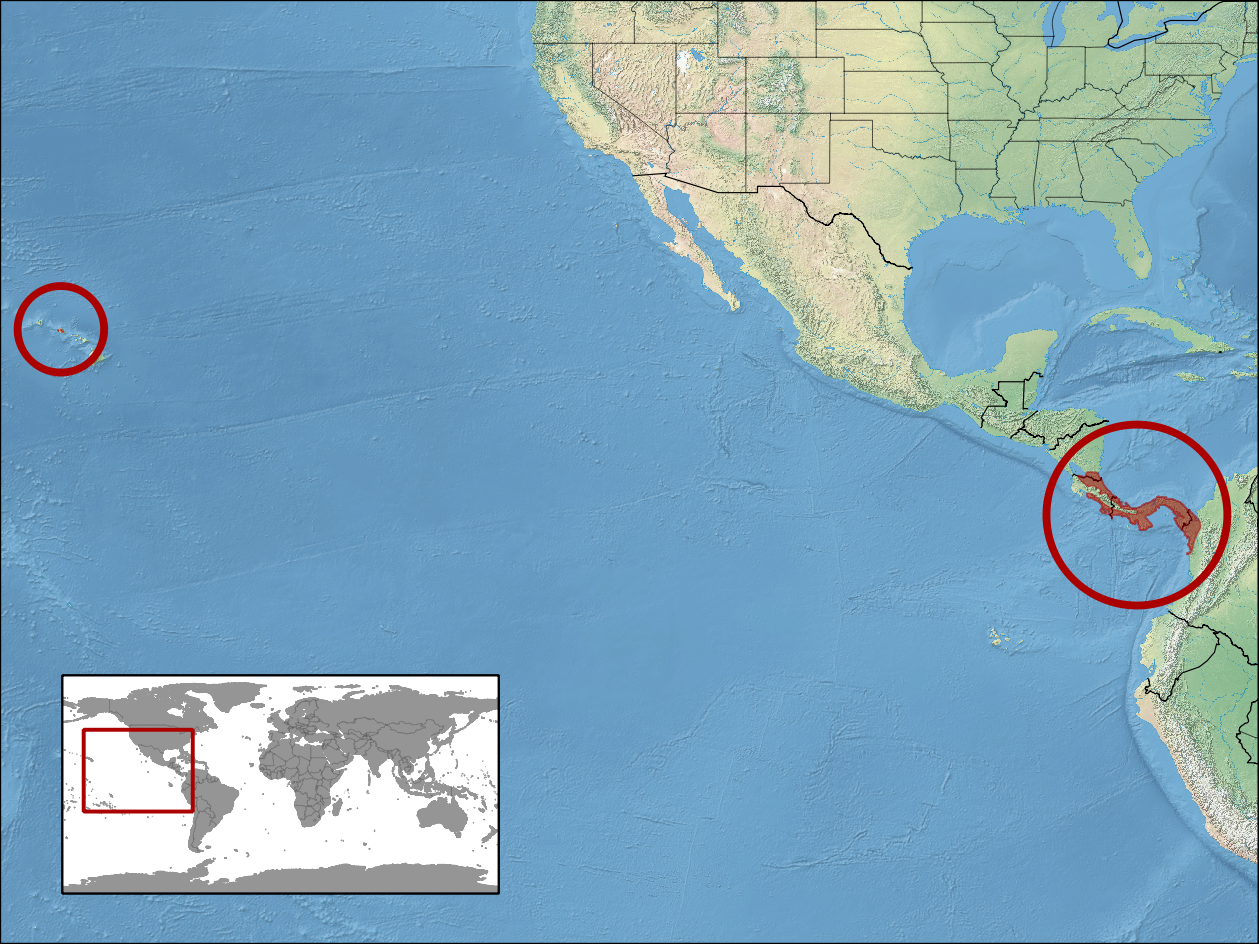
- Range in red (Hawaiian population introduced)

Synonyms
- Phyllobates auratus Girard, 1855 "1854"; Dendrobates latimaculatus Günther, 1859 "1858"; Dendrobates amoenus Werner, 1901

= Green and black poison dart frog =

Species of amphibian

Dendrobates auratus, also known as the green-and-black poison dart frog, the green-and-black poison arrow frog, green-and-black poison frog, green poison dart frog, green poison arrow frog, and green poison frog, is a brightly-colored member of the order Anura native to southern Central America and Colombia. This species has also been introduced to Oahu, Hawaii in an effort to lower mosquito numbers. It is one of the most variably colored species of poison dart frogs, after D. tinctorius, Adelphobates galactonotus and some Oophaga species. From a conservation standpoint, it is considered to be of least concern by the International Union for Conservation of Nature.

== Description ==
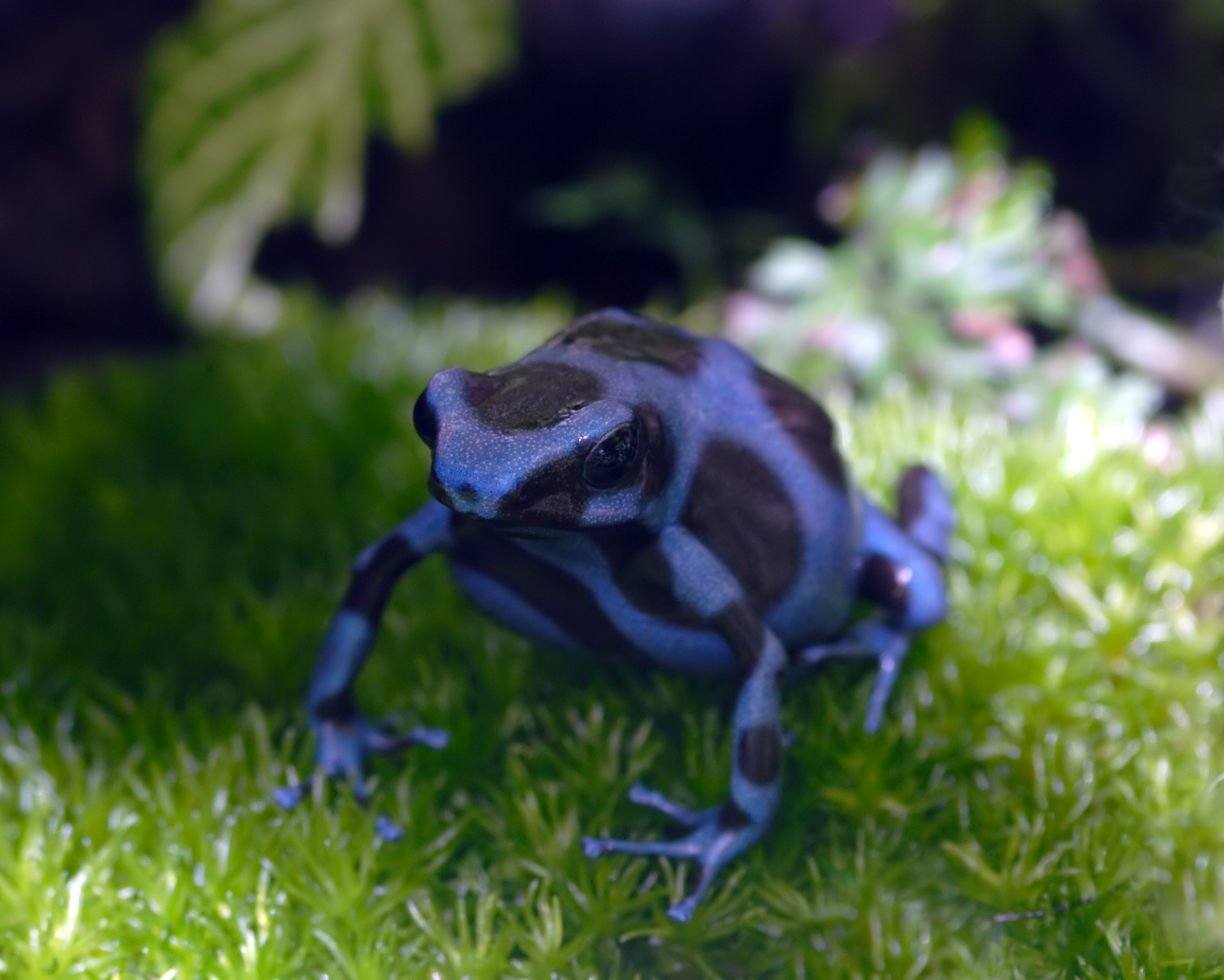
Although typically blackish with a variable pattern of green, other colors are also possible. Blue is seen in certain locations in Panama

D. auratus has the typical appearance of the members of its family; males average 0.75 in (1.9 cm) in snout–vent length, while females are slightly larger, averaging 1 in (2.5 cm) or longer.

D. auratus is one of the most variable of all poison frogs in color and pattern. This variation is to some extent individual, but also depends heavily on exact location. Despite the common name green-and-black poison dart frog, some variants have no green or no black; a few, like the brown and cream-white Campana variant, may have neither green nor black. However, most often, green-and-black poison dart frogs have a highly variable, spotted or banded pattern in vivid mint-green coloration, but this can also be a darker green, forest-green, lime, emerald, turquoise, or even blue, whitish or pale yellow. Mixed with this are splotches of dark or dull coloring, most often blackish, but ranging from whitish-brown and bronzy brown to dark brown and pure black. The amount of dark or dull coloring varies greatly (certain variants are entirely black, or dark with only a few small green spots or streaks) and may appear as large or small spots or blotches, or as a dappled or "splashed" pattern.

== Distribution ==
The green-and-black poison dart frog is found in humid lowland and submontane forests at altitudes of 0–1,000 m (0–3,280 ft) in southeastern Nicaragua on the Atlantic slope, eastern Costa Rica on the Atlantic slope and in the southwest on the Pacific slope, widely in Panama, and into far northwestern Colombia in the Chocó Department. An introduced population exists on Oahu, in Hawaii; the species was intentionally introduced there, in 1932, for mosquito control. Later on, it seems to have also become established on Maui.

== Poison ==
Like all dendrobatid poison frogs, D. auratus are not innately poisonous. Instead, they sequester alkaloid poisons from their diet of arthropods (primarily ants and mites). Hundreds of unique alkaloids have been identified in this these frogs, including indolizidines, decahydroquinolines, pumiliotoxins, histrionicotoxins, and coccinellines. These alkaloid poisons inhibit the function of voltage-gated ion-channels, and nicotinic acetylcholine receptors, which can lead to numbness, loss of motor control, convulsions, and in cases of extreme intoxication cardiac arrest or death.

== Behavior ==
D. auratus is semi-arboreal, hunting, courting, and sleeping in the trees. Like other dart frogs, they spend much time in the shallow pools of water created in the cup-like leaves of bromeliad plants. The same plants often serve as nurseries for tadpoles. The small pools offer little access to nutrients so the tadpoles often engage in cannibalism. As it is a tiny frog, it cannot obviously leap from branch to branch in the treetops, thus it returns to the ground when it wants to travel. Once on the ground, frogs may travel several miles in an effort to breed, find feeding grounds, or to take care of tadpoles. To assist in climbing, the frog has small, sucker-like discs on the ends of its toes, which create a slight suction as the frogs climb, making their grip mildly adhesive.

== Reproduction ==
Unlike other poison frogs, D. auratus gather in large groups before mating. They squabble over territories; eventually, each individual male frog clears a small patch for himself. Females wander among the males, with the latter then attempting to impress the former with their bird-like mating calls. Captive female D. auratus are known to fight amongst themselves in the presence of calling males. Once a male has caught the attention of a female, he leads her to a site he has selected for egg deposition. The female lays her eggs, which he then fertilizes. In about 14 days, these hatch into tadpoles. Their parents, typically the male, then carry the tadpoles into the canopy, with the tadpoles sticking to the mucus on their parents' backs. The parents then deposit their tadpoles into the small pools of water that accumulate in the center of bromeliads, and guard the tadpoles while they feed on algae and small invertebrates that inhabit the tiny pool.

== As pets ==
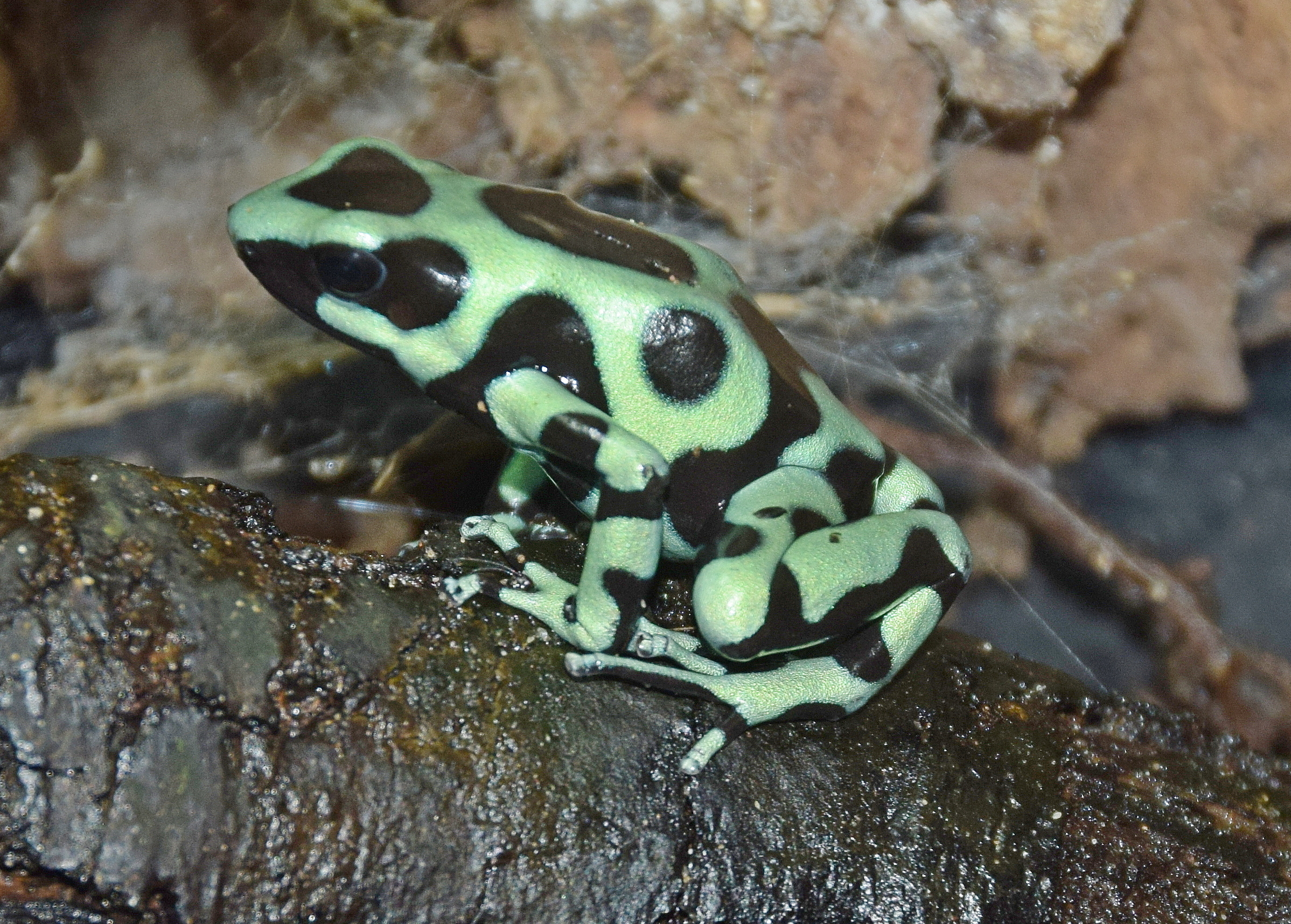
Green-and-black poison dart frog in captivity in England

D. auratus is popular as an exotic pet due to its small size, bright colors, and intriguing behavior. As poison frogs get their toxicity from their diet, when they are in captive or zoo settings they are completely non-toxic, being fed a diet of crickets and fruit flies.
