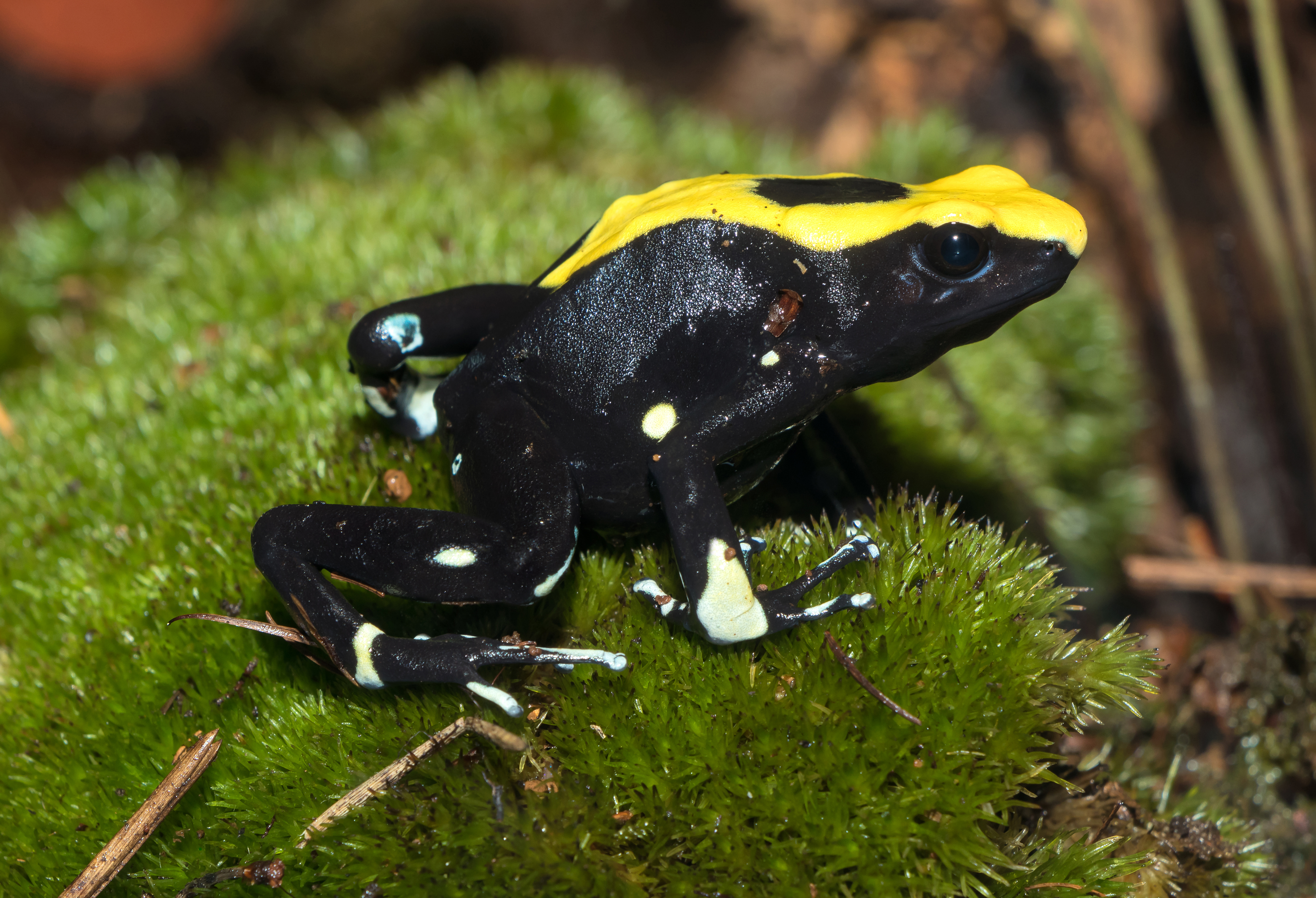
- Dendrobates tinctorius

Scientific classification
- Kingdom: Animalia
- Phylum: Chordata
- Class: Amphibia
- Order: Anura
- Family: Dendrobatidae
- Subfamily: Dendrobatinae
- Genus: Dendrobates; Wagler, 1830

Type species
- Dendrobates tinctorius Cuvier, 1797

Diversity
- 5 species (see text)
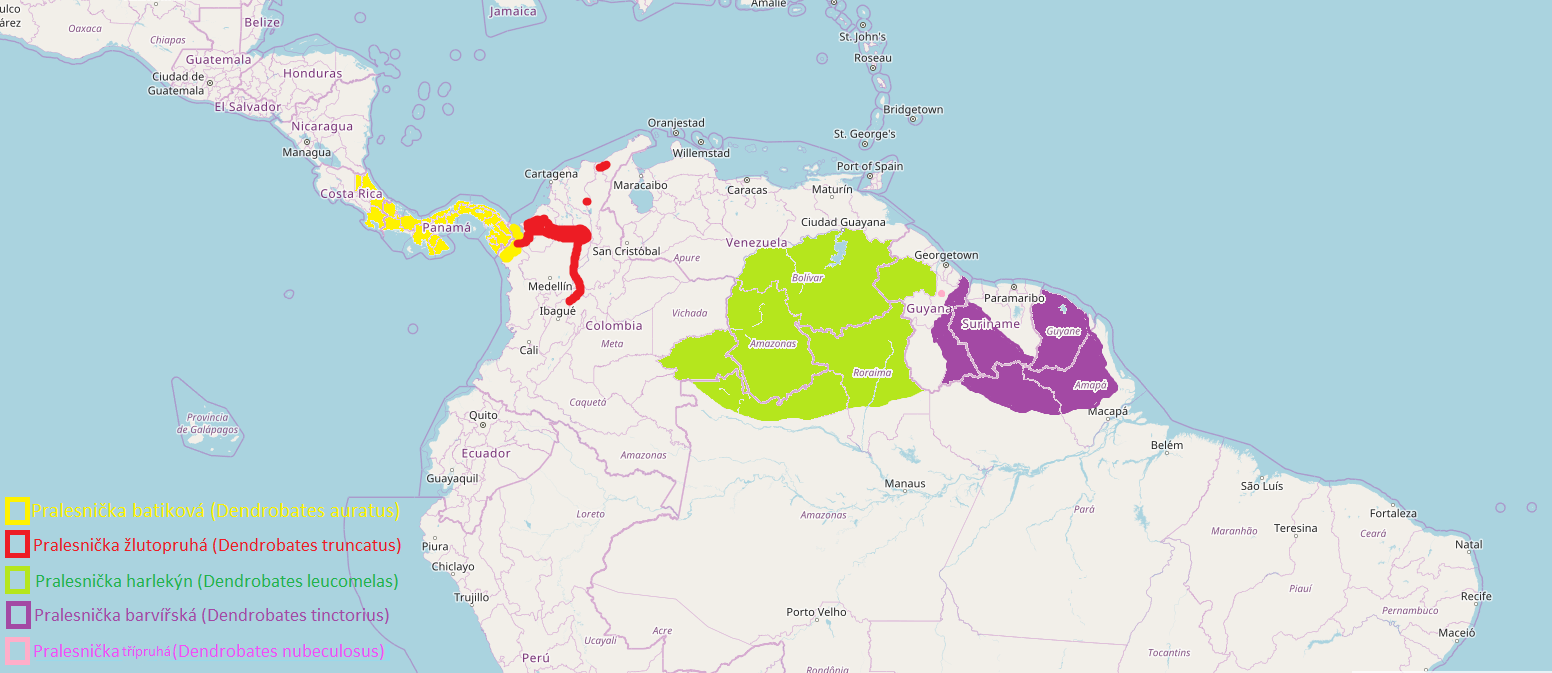
- Distribution of the five Dendrobates species

= Dendrobates =

Genus of amphibians

Dendrobates is a genus of poison dart frogs native to Central and South America. It once contained numerous species, but most originally placed in this genus have been split off into other genera such as Adelphobates, Ameerega, Andinobates, Epipedobates, Excidobates, Oophaga, Phyllobates and Ranitomeya (essentially all the brightly marked poison dart frogs; i.e. excluding the duller genera in the family like Colostethus and Hyloxalus), leaving only five large to medium-sized species in the genus Dendrobates. All the other genera used to be grouped in with Dendrobates because it was previously thought that all brightly colored poison dart frogs came from the same ancestor but this has since been proven to be incorrect. Dendrobates and Phyllobates evolved conspicuous coloration from the same common ancestor but not the same as any of the other genera listed above.

There is accumulating evidence that Dendrobates are diet specialists and sequester the toxin found on their skin from their diet. It has been found that diet specialization evolved in tandem with conspicuous coloration in the case of Dendrobates.

The generic name Dendrobates comes from Ancient Greek δένδρον (déndron), meaning "tree", and -βάτης (bátes), meaning "climber".

Dendrobates mostly live on the forest floor. They lay their eggs in damp leaf litter on the forest floor. After the eggs hatch, some species of Dendrobates carry their tadpoles on their backs up to the rainforest canopy so they can grow in the pools of water on top of Bromeliaceae, and feed their tadpoles with unfertilized eggs.

== Species ==
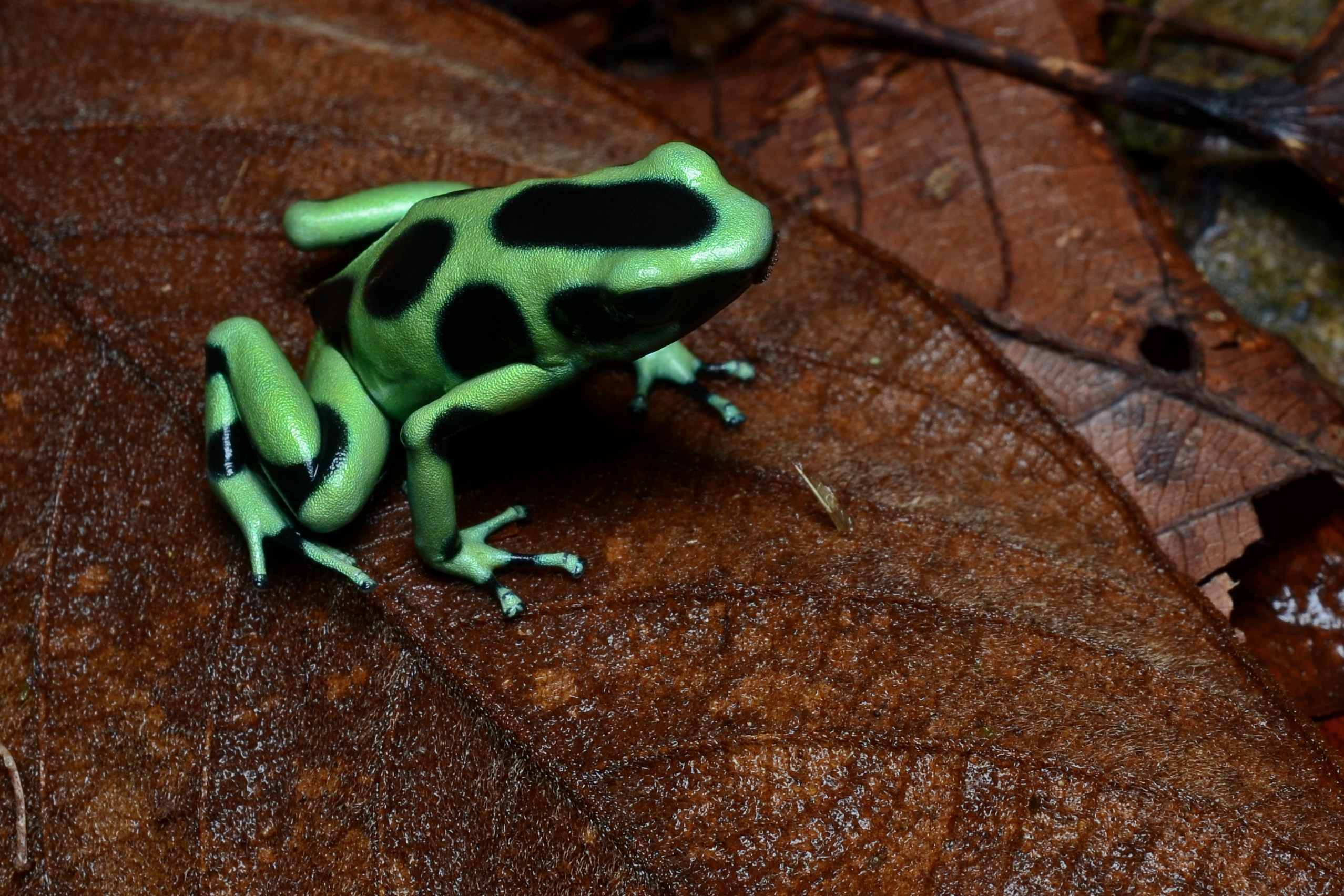
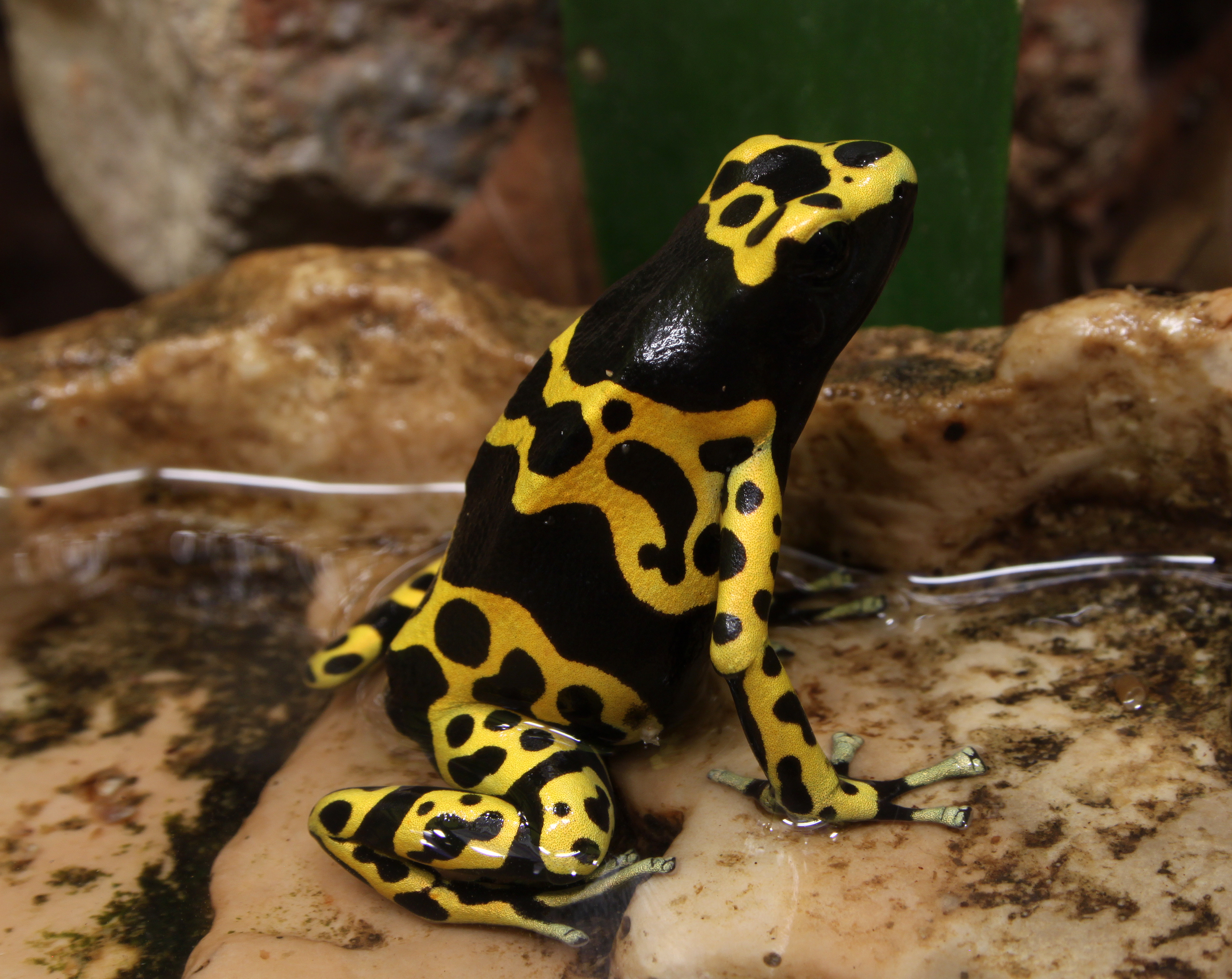
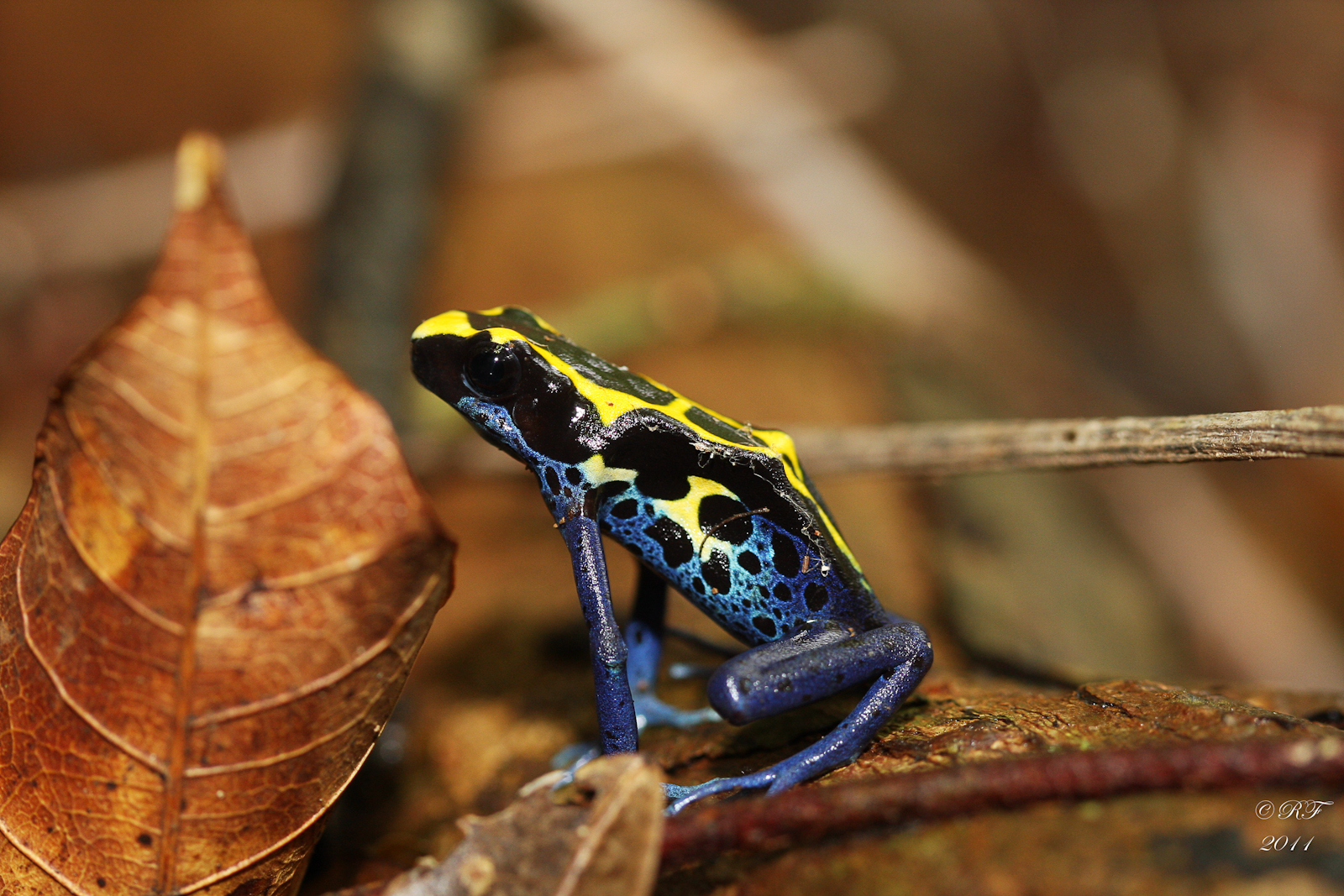
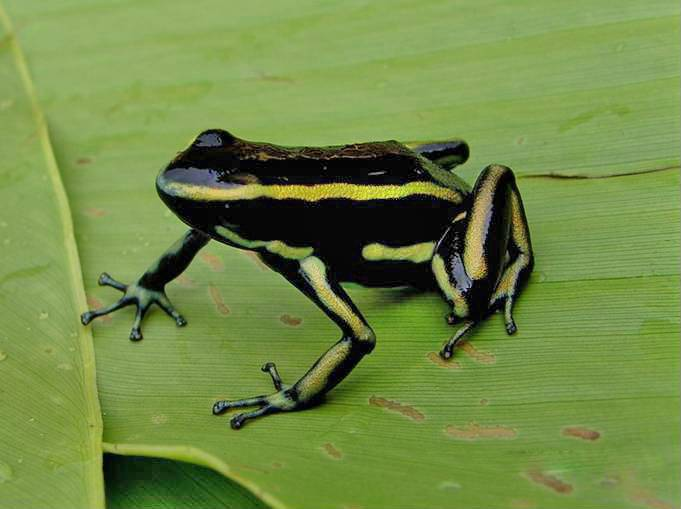
Image	Common name	Binomial name and authority	Distribution
	Green and black poison dart frog	Dendrobates auratus (Girard, 1855)	southeastern Nicaragua on the Atlantic slope and southeastern Costa Rica on the Pacific coast through Panama to northwestern Colombia (Chocó Department)
	Yellow-banded poison dart frog	Dendrobates leucomelas Steindachner, 1864	Guyana, Brazil, Venezuela and the extreme easternmost part of Colombia
	Rockstone poison dart frog	Dendrobates nubeculosus Jungfer and Böhme, 2004	near Rockstone, Guyana
	Dyeing poison dart frog	Dendrobates tinctorius (Cuvier, 1797)	Guiana Shield, including parts of Guyana, Suriname, Brazil, and nearly all of French Guiana.
	Yellow-striped poison dart frog	Dendrobates truncatus (Cope, 1861)	Colombia
	Blue poison dart frog	Dendrobates tinctorius "azureus" (Hoogmoed, 1969)	Found in the "Forest Islands" in southern Suriname, Brazil.
