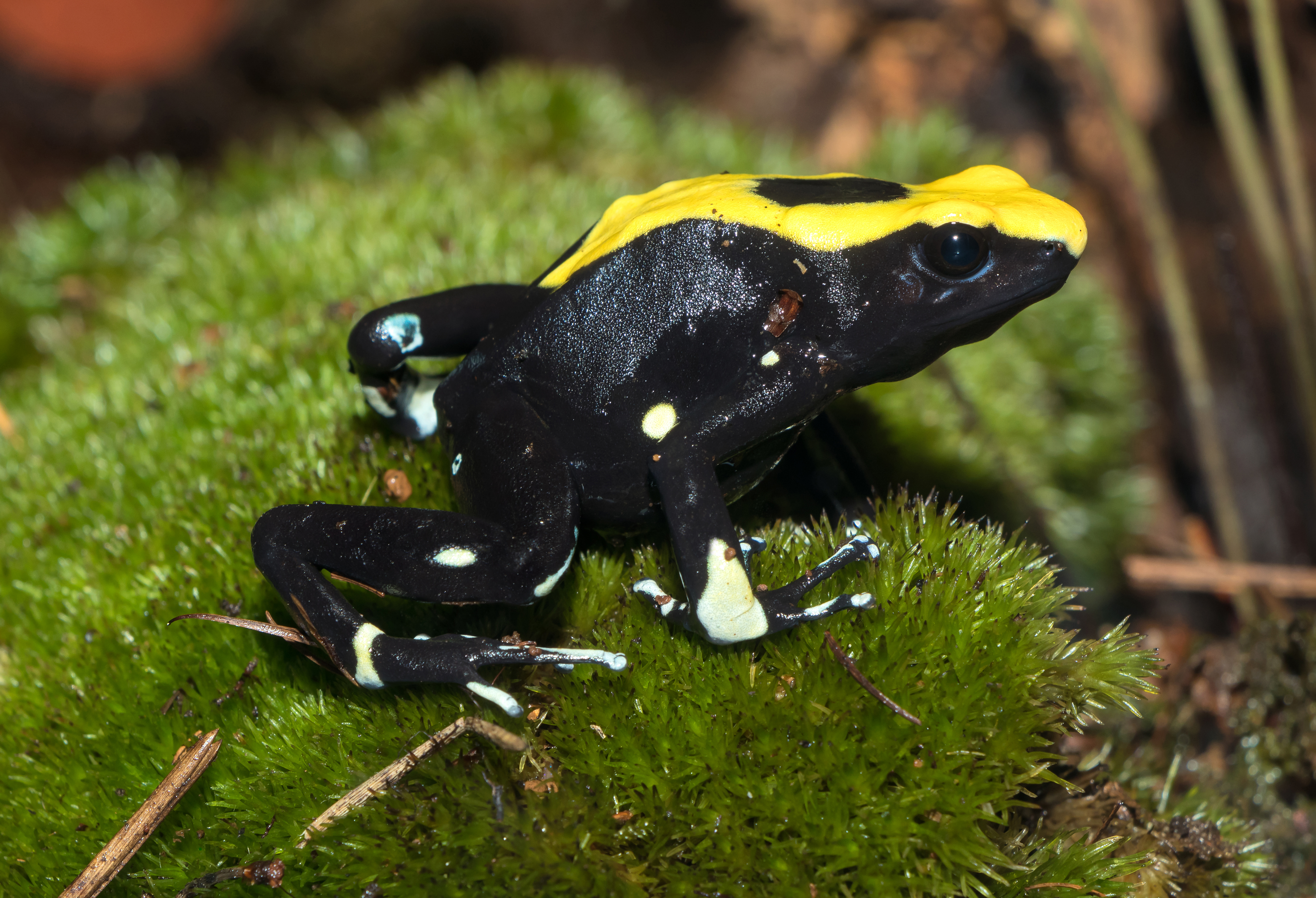
- D. tinctorius "yellow back"

Conservation status
- Least Concern (IUCN 3.1)
- CITES Appendix II

Scientific classification
- Kingdom: Animalia
- Phylum: Chordata
- Class: Amphibia
- Order: Anura
- Family: Dendrobatidae
- Genus: Dendrobates
- Species: D. tinctorius

Binomial name
- Dendrobates tinctorius (Cuvier, 1797)
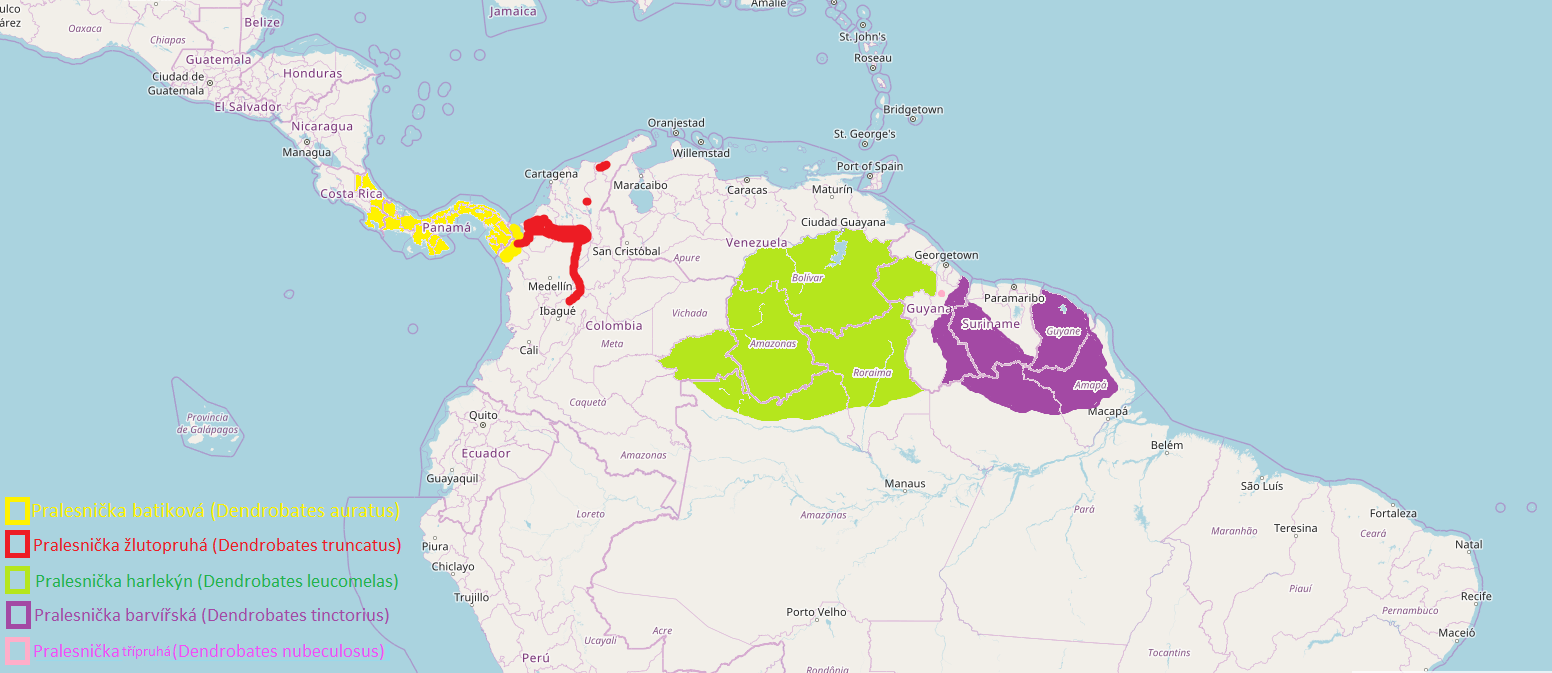
- Distribution of the five Dendrobates species, with D. tinctorius in purple

= Dyeing poison dart frog =

Species of amphibian

The cobalt dyeing poison dart frog (Dendrobates tinctorius), also known as the cobalt poison frog or tinc, is a species of poison dart frog. It is among the most variably colored and largest species of poison dart frogs, typically reaching snout–vent lengths of about 50 mm (2.0 in). It is distributed in the eastern portion of the Guiana Shield, including parts of French Guiana, Guyana, Suriname, and Brazil. These types of frogs usually tend to stay on the ground as it is easier to catch prey., though in some cases may climb trees as well. They are frequently found in treefall canopy gaps in the Amazon rainforest, as they utilize phytotelmata on the fallen trees for tadpole development.

== Etymology ==
The specific name, tinctorius, comes not from the variety of colors, but from the legends of some indigenous tribes. It has been said that tribe members used the frog poisons to cause green parrot feathers to grow different colors.

== Distribution and habitat ==
The dyeing poison dart frog exists in discrete patches of the eastern Guiana Shield, being found at altitudes up to 600 m (2,000 ft). It is found in regions of tropical primary rainforests, but is associated with areas with canopy gaps. It is mostly found in upland areas, for example in hills or at the base of mountains, but populations are also present at sea level. Erosion of the highlands has contributed to creating isolate populations. A study shows that Dendrobates tinctorius tadpoles can survive in pools having a high level of KH, vertical height of 15 mi (79,000 ft) and salinity up to 955 ppm.

== Description ==
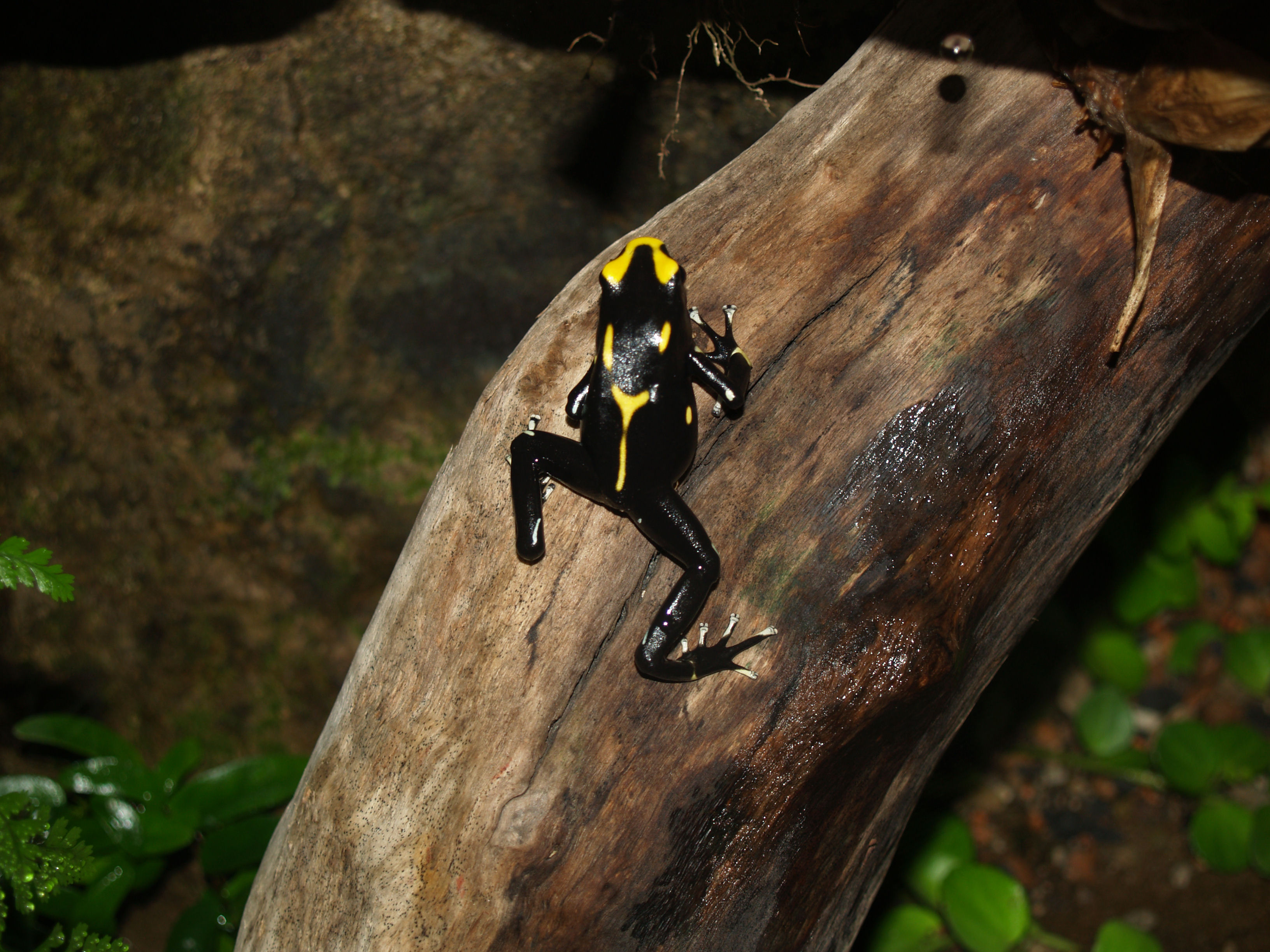
Male Dendrobates tinctorius "Alanis" climbing at the Zurich Zoo

The dyeing poison dart frog is large for a poison dart frog, but may be smaller than Phyllobates terribilis and Ameerega trivittata. Small forms of D. tinctorius reach 3.5 cm (1.4 in) in snout–vent length; most variants are around 5 cm (2.0 in) in length or slightly bigger; some of the largest variants may reach 7 cm (2.8 in). Although some variants are smaller or larger, differences tend to be average with some overlap in full size range (i.e., a large individual of a small variant often is comparable in size to a small individual of a large variant).

Males are typically smaller and more slender than females, with larger toe discs. The toe discs of female dyeing poison dart frogs are circular while those of the males are heart-shaped. Also the females have arched backs as opposed to males who have curved ones.

=== Morphs ===
Dendrobates tinctorius is one of the most variably colored and patterned of all poison dart frogs, with more than 30 recognized variants or morphs. Each main variant or morph is unique to a locality or region, although there is also a level of individual variation in each. Typically, the body is primarily black, with an irregular pattern of yellow or whitish stripes running along the back, upper flanks and head, and an irregular pattern of blue stripes on the lower flanks, belly and throat. The legs typically are blue peppered with small black; the blue ranges from pale blue, sky blue or blue-gray to royal blue, cobalt blue, navy blue or greenish blue. In some variants or morphs, however, the body and legs may be primarily blue (as in the "azureus" of southern Suriname, now usually considered a morph of the dyeing poison dart frog), primarily yellow, or primarily whitish. The "Matécho" morph from Saül, French Guiana, is mostly yellow and with some black, with only a few specks of white on the toes and sometimes whitish on the underparts. Another variant, the "Citronella" morph from the vicinity of Kasikasima, Suriname, is primarily deep yellow with some black blotches on the back and head, and royal blue legs and underparts with tiny black spots. Despite the large variation in appearance, the genetic differences between the different populations of the dyeing poison dart frog are very marginal.

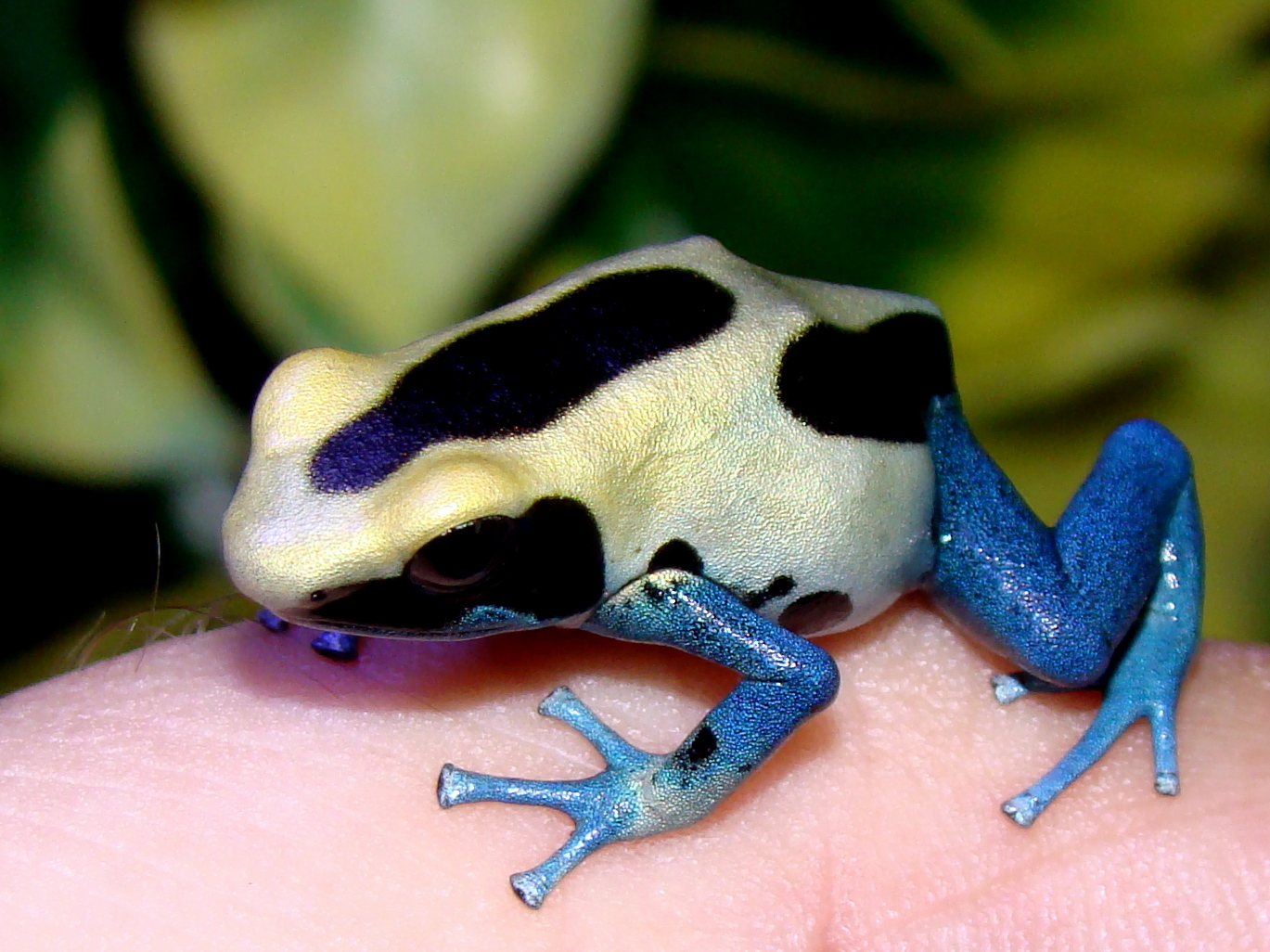
D. tinctorius "Patricia"

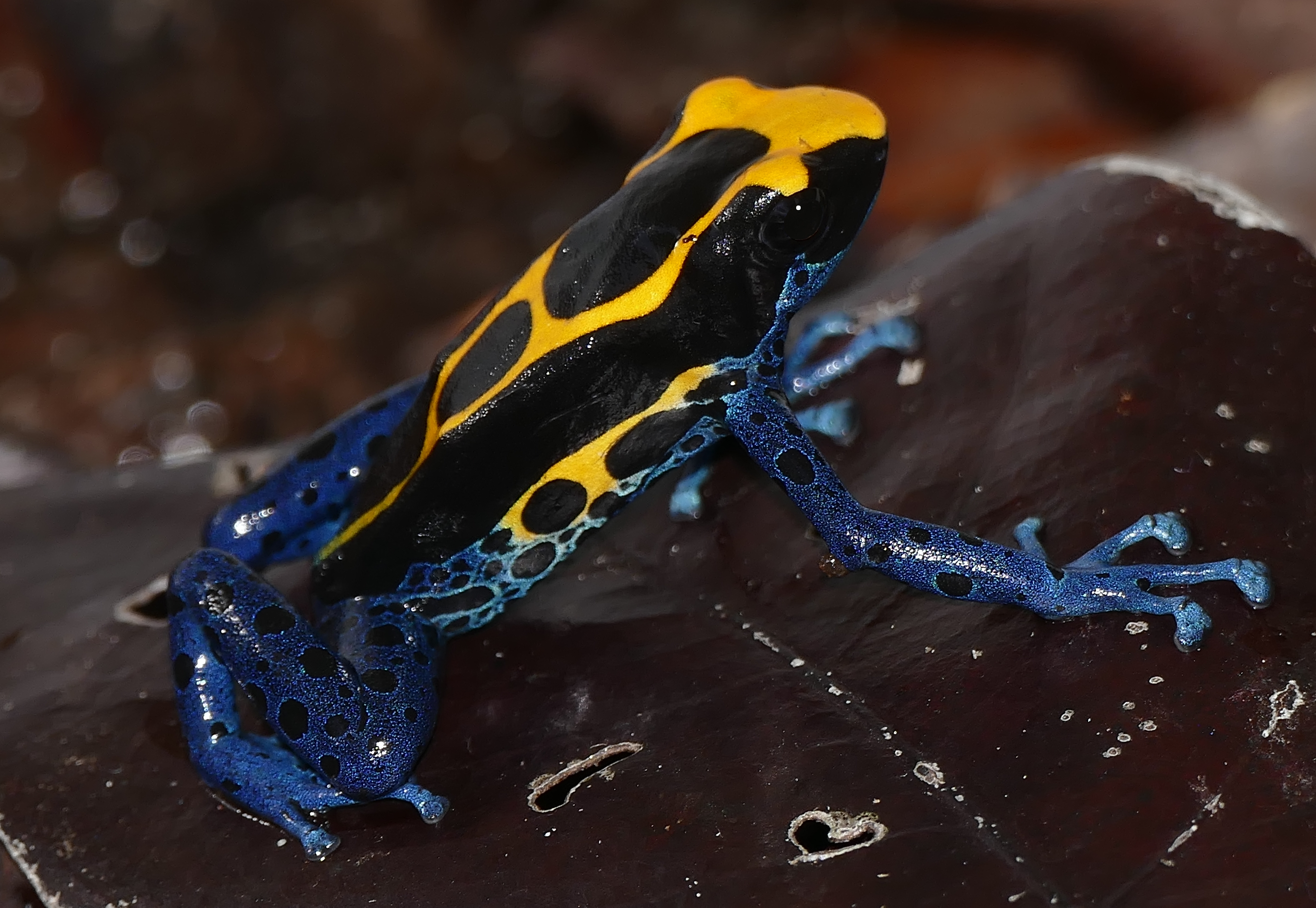
In Roura, French Guiana

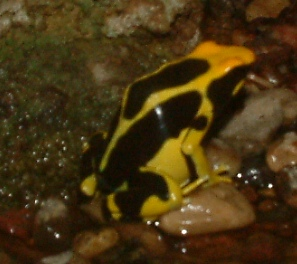
D. tinctorius "Regina"

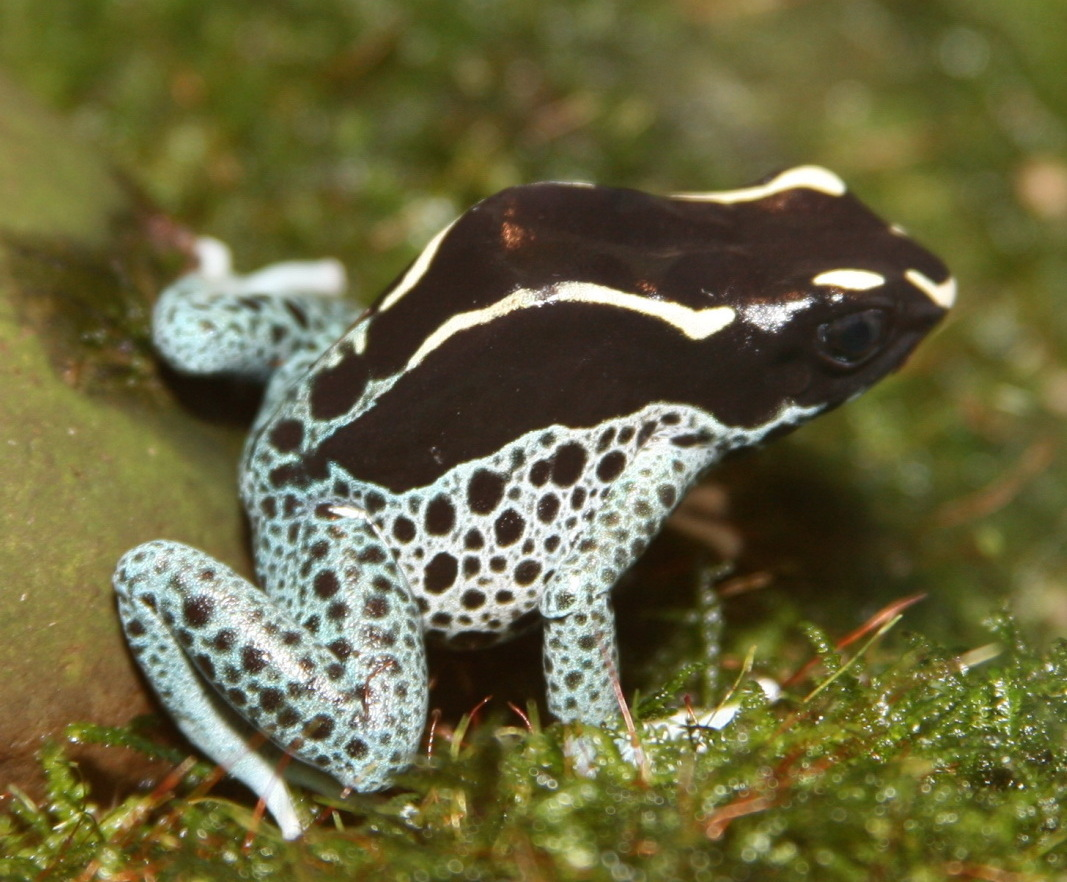
D. tinctorius "Powder Blue"

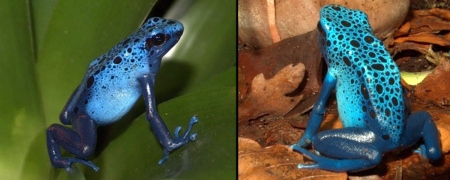
D. tinctorius "azureus"

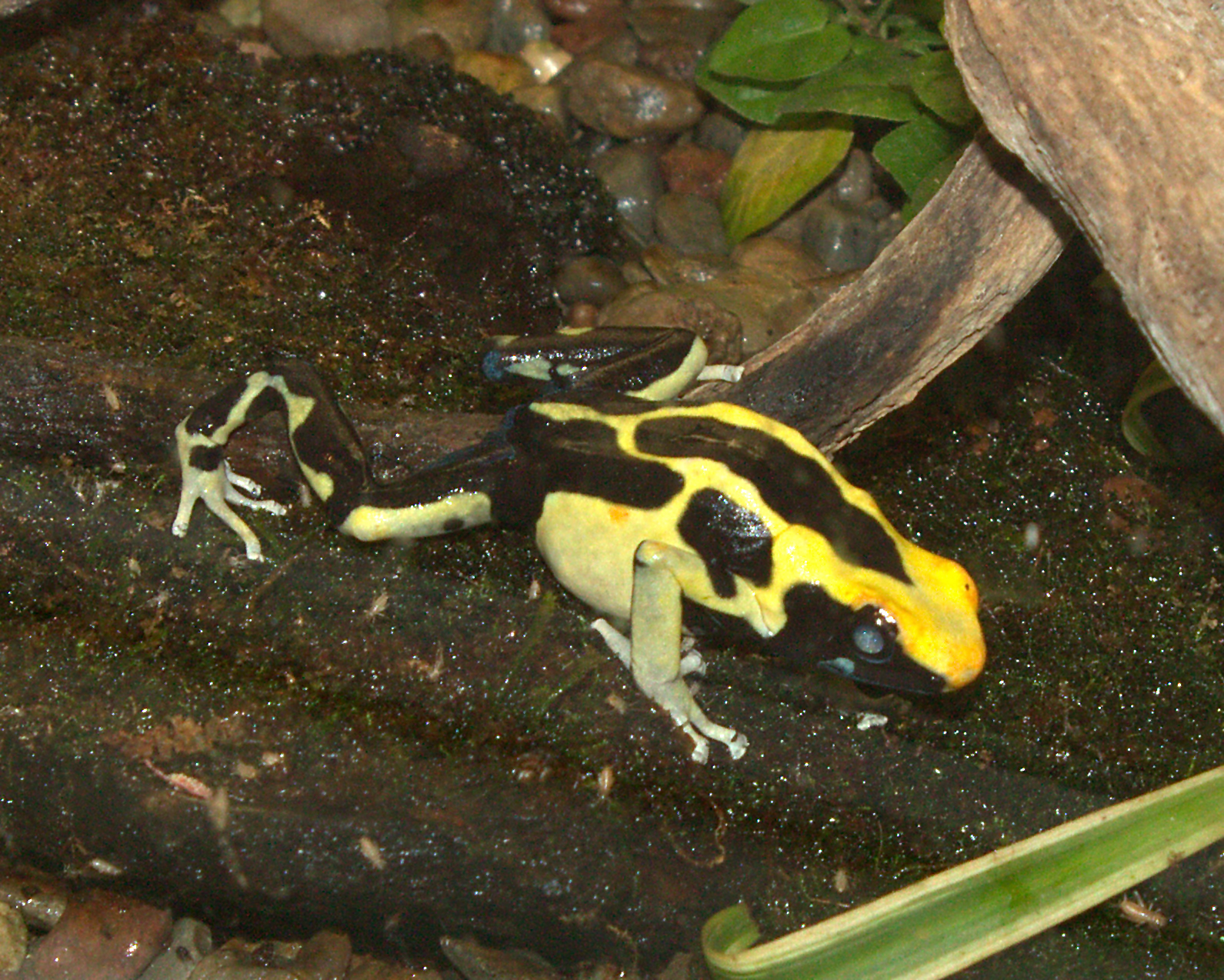
D. tinctorius "Giant Orange"

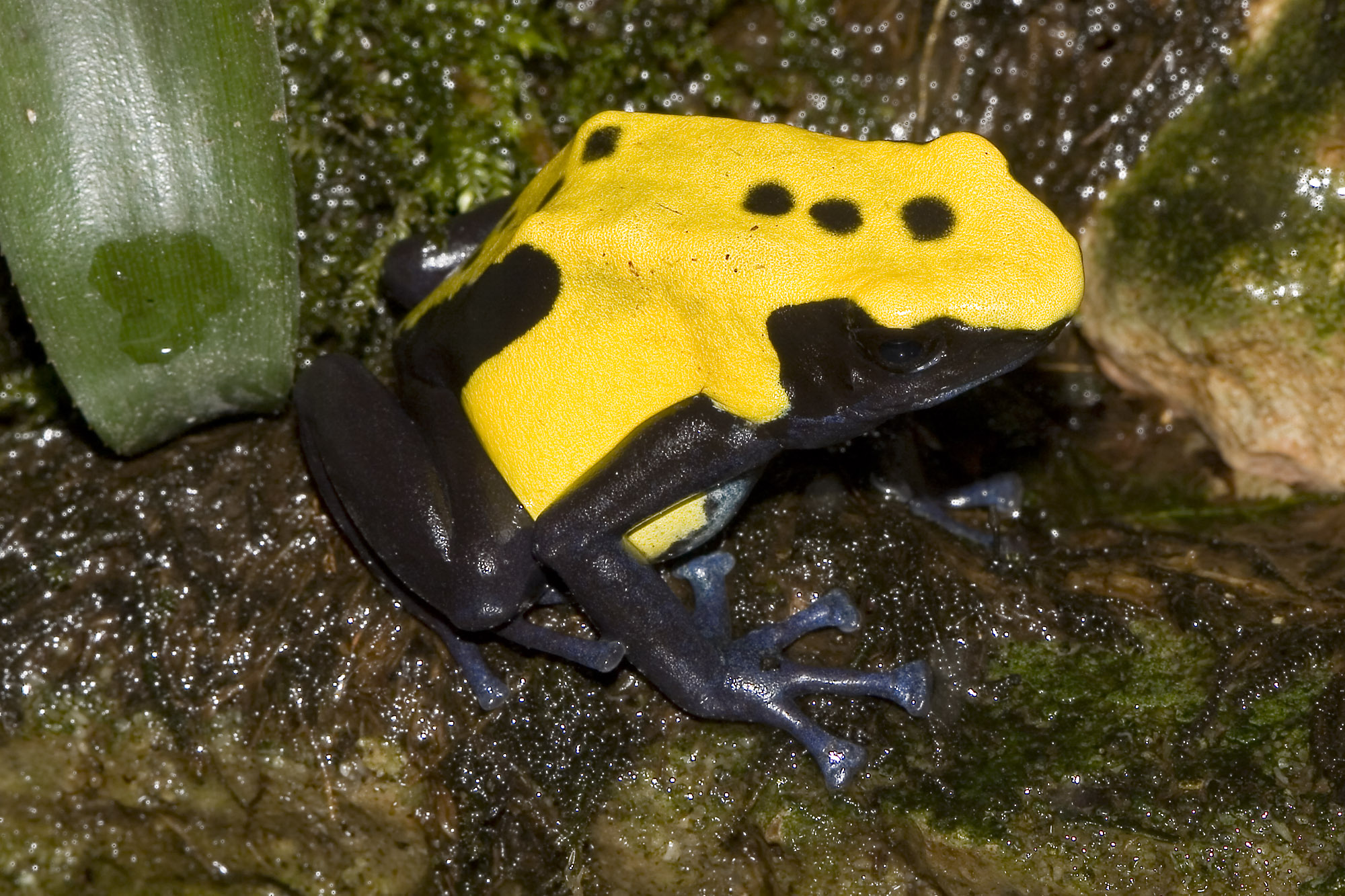
D. tinctorius "Citronella"

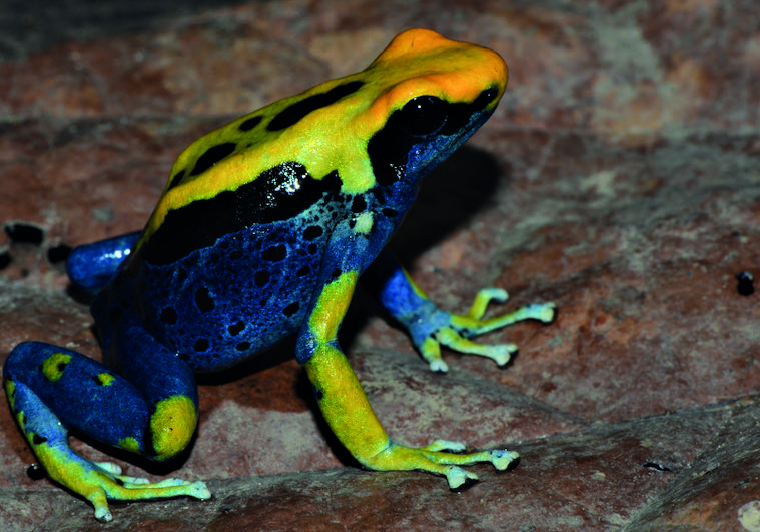
In Amapá, Brazil

== Poison ==
Like many species of the genus Dendrobates, D. tinctorius can be toxic if consumed. Interestingly, dendrobatid poison frogs like D. tinctorius do not produce their own poisons, but rather sequester noxious alkaloids from a diet of chemical-containing arthropods, largely ants and mites. Alkaloid secretions in dendrobatid frogs like D. tinctorius can be highly toxic. They work by interfering with nervous and muscular tissue, specifically inhibiting calcium channels, sodium channels, potassium channels, or nicotinic acetylcholine receptors. This can lead to locomotor difficulties, convulsions, paralysis, or even death. Common alkaloids found in this species are 3,5-disubstituted indolizidines, 5,6,8-trisubstitued indolizidines, 2,6-disubstituted decahydroquinolines, and histrionicotoxins. Skin secretions containing these alkaloids can cause pain, cramping, and stiffness if they are absorbed by a predator's body. As D. tinctorius are aposematic animals, predators attempting to feed on them are thought to associate their bright colors with their unpalatable secretions and pain that occurs after a frog is tasted.

In the northwest of the Brazilian Amazon rainforest, there was a report of intoxication by this species. The patients were two photographers, 47 and 30 years old and both men. One photographer quickly captured the frog and held it for about five seconds with his own hands, before releasing it and washing his hands in a nearby stream. The other photographer kept the frog from moving by placing both his hands on top. Neither of them suffered hand injuries. Both photographed the poison dart frog for about five minutes without touching it again. However, 20 minutes after the first contact, the photographer who initially handled it began to feel numbness in his right arm, mainly at the height of the forearm. The other photographer, who after taking photos had touched his mouth without first washing his hands, felt a slight numbness in his lower lip. After 40 minutes, they no longer felt symptoms. Their symptoms could have been aggravated if the contact with the animal had lasted longer or if there had been a wound at the points of contact.
