= Histrionicotoxins =

Group of chemical compounds

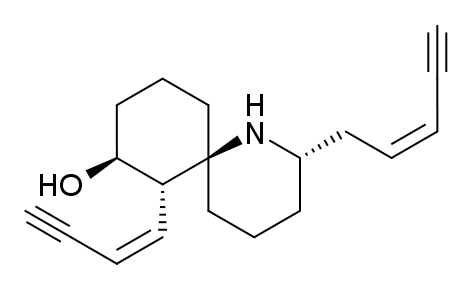
Histrionicotoxin 283A

Histrionicotoxins are a group of related toxins found in the skin of poison frogs from the family Dendrobatidae, notably Oophaga histrionica (formerly Dendrobates histrionicus), which are native to Colombia. It is likely that, as with other poison frog alkaloids, histrionicotoxins are not manufactured by the amphibians, but absorbed from insects in their diet and stored in glands in their skin. They are notably less toxic than other alkaloids found in poison frogs, yet their distinct structure acts as a neurotoxin by non-competitive inhibition of nicotinic acetylcholine receptors.

== History ==
The first record of histrionicotoxins dates to 1823 by Captain Charles Stuart Cochrane. Cochrane was exploring the tropical rainforests around Colombia and Panama. His reports mention tribes of Indians who used poison tipped arrows and blowgun darts for hunting and war. Upon further exploration, Cochrane found that these Indians extracted the poison from the skins of the poison dart frog, then known as Dendrobates histrionicus. An account from his diary reads:

"[...] called rana de veneno by the Spanish, about three inches long, yellow on the back, with very large black eyes... those who use poison catch the frogs in the woods and confine them in a hollow cane where they regularly feed them until they want the poison, when they take the unfortunate reptile and pass a pointed piece of wood down his throat and out of one of his legs. This torture makes the poor frog perspire very much, especially on the back, which becomes covered in a white froth; this is the most powerful poison that he yields, and in this they dip or roll the tips of their arrows, which will preserve their destructive power for a year. Afterwards, below this white substance, appears a yellow oil, which is carefully scraped off, and retains its deadly influence for four to six months, according to the goodness (as they say) of the frog. By this means, from one frog sufficient poison is obtained for about fifty arrows."

== Chemical properties ==
Histrionicotoxins are a class rather than a specific poison and this broad spectrum poses synthetic challenges. Structures of histrionicotoxins were characterized in 1971. Since then, several synthetic studies and total syntheses have been carried out. Table 1 describes some of the many variations in histrionicotoxin alkaloids from the parent molecule (283A).

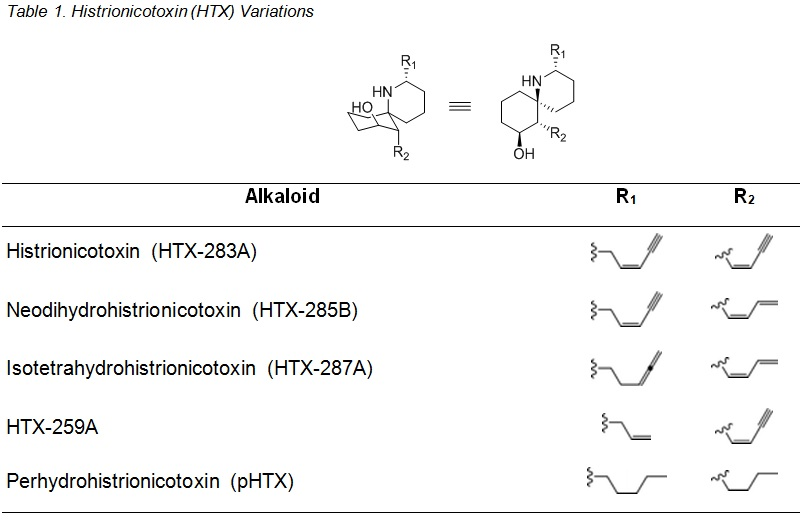
A table describing a few variants of the arrow poison, histrionicotoxin.

=== Synthesis ===
Since characterization, the development of synthetic pathways to histrionicotoxin has been of interest to research groups due to its unusual functionality. The Kishi group proposed the first total synthesis of the parent 283A in 1985 using 89, a previously synthesized lactam used for the synthesis of other variants. Treatment with acetic anhydride yielded 133 in quantitative yield. The cyclic enol ether 134 was formed through oxidative cleavage promoting intramolecular addition followed by a basic deprotection and dehydration. Bromination followed by dehydrobromination in methanol was then found to give an epimeric mixture of unsaturated 135. Hydrolysis, reduction and acetylation yielded 136. Formation of a thiolactam followed by condensation with ethyl bromoacetate gave 137. Selective deprotection of the allylic alcohol followed by oxidation gave 138. A Wittig reaction then generated a chloroalkene, which, upon base-promoted elimination of HCl, gave a terminal alkyne, which was subsequently protected to form 139. The olefinic function of 139 was first reduced using cyanoborohydride before further reduction of 140 to an epimeric mixture of alcohols. A retro-Michael addition was then performed under basic conditions at low temperature, successfully epimerising this compound to give the desired epimer 141. A reaction with triphenylphosphine then generated the phosphonium salt 142, and a Wittig reaction could then be performed to attach the silyl-protected cis-ene-yne function, which was then deprotected to yield the target (±)-HTX 283A.

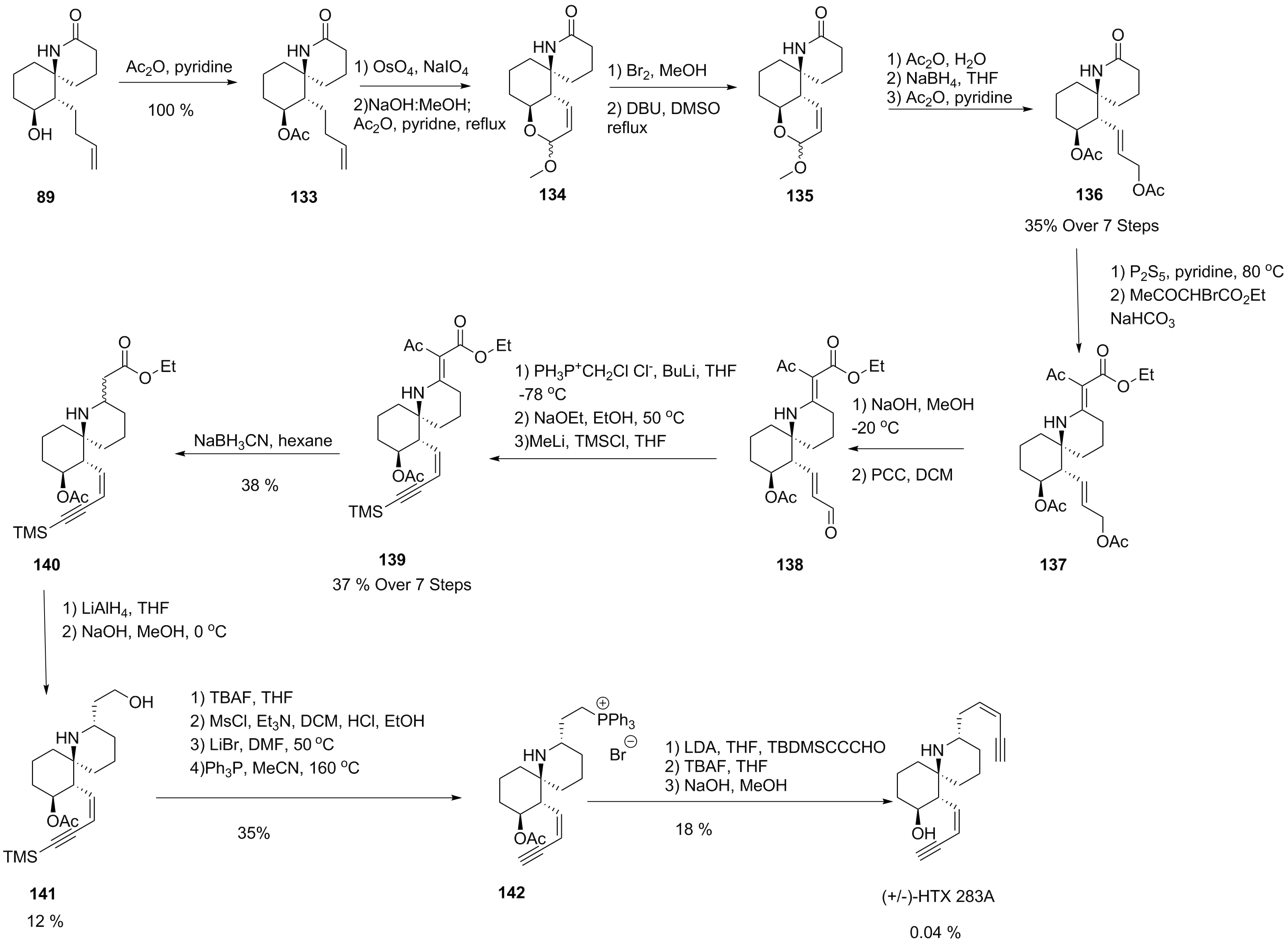
25 Step Synthesis of HTX presented by the Kishi group in 1985.

== Mechanism of action ==
HTX acts as a noncompetitive antagonist of nicotinic acetylcholine receptors, which are implicated in neural signaling. As a non-competitive antagonist, HTX binds to a subunit of the nicotinic acetylcholine receptor.^{3} This actually increases the affinity for the agonist acetylcholine and stabilizes the desensitized receptor. This blocks action potentials and slows neural function. Histrionicotoxin has been shown to bind competitively with many local anesthetics, such as tetracaine, as well as other aromatic amine non-competitive antagonists of the receptors, indicating the compounds likely share a binding site; this site of interaction is located outside the transmembrane domain of the nicotinic acetylcholine receptor, though the exact interaction remains uncharacterized. While histrionicotoxin does share a binding location with other non-competitive antagonists of the nicotinic acetylcholine receptor, it has been proven to have relatively higher affinity for desensitized receptors than phencyclidine, indicating further yet uncharacterized subtlety in the nature of its binding. Additionally, studies of the effects of histrionicotoxin on end-plate potential have shown that the compound hinders membrane potential propagation, but has emergent characteristics with membrane hyperpolarizations. The binding of histrionicotoxin is rapidly reversible, and so it can be readily removed from affected regions with repeated washing, or, in vivo, with natural bodily diffusion. High concentrations of HTX have been demonstrated to have antagonistic effects on batrachotoxin.

=== Toxicity ===
Histrionicotoxin is relatively not as toxic as other alkaloids from poison dart frogs. Preliminary tests showed that mice could survive a 5 mg/kg dose of histrionicotoxin 283a and recover within 3 hours with no lasting effects.

== See also ==
- Pumiliotoxin
