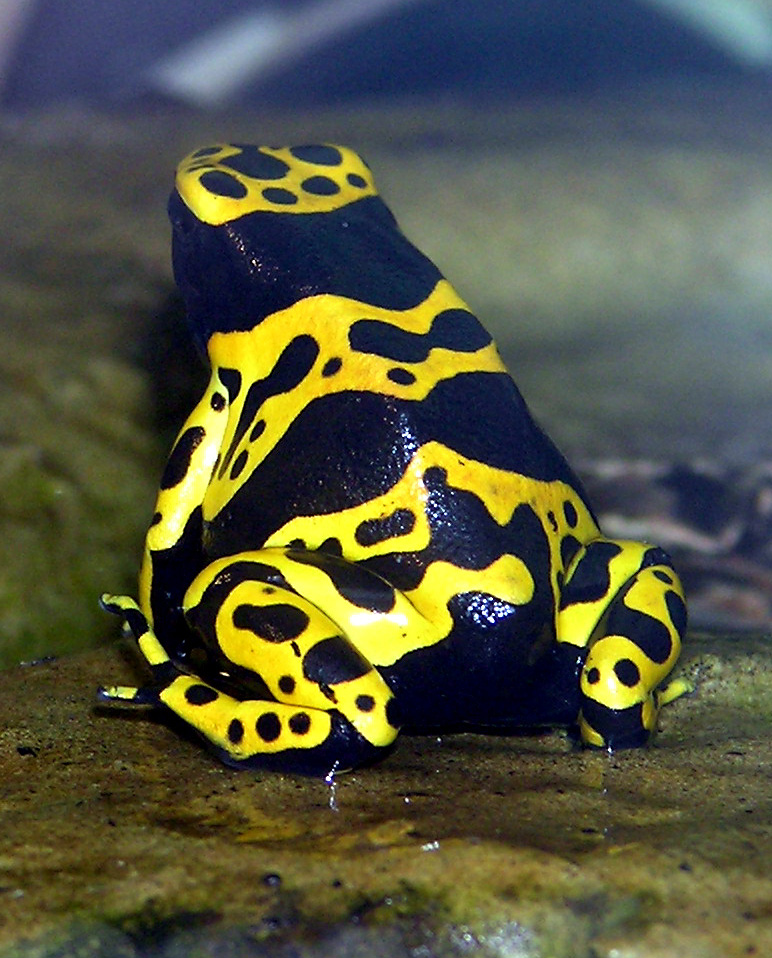

Conservation status
- Least Concern (IUCN 3.1)
- CITES Appendix II

Scientific classification
- Kingdom: Animalia
- Phylum: Chordata
- Class: Amphibia
- Order: Anura
- Family: Dendrobatidae
- Genus: Dendrobates
- Species: D. leucomelas

Binomial name
- Dendrobates leucomelas Steindachner, 1864
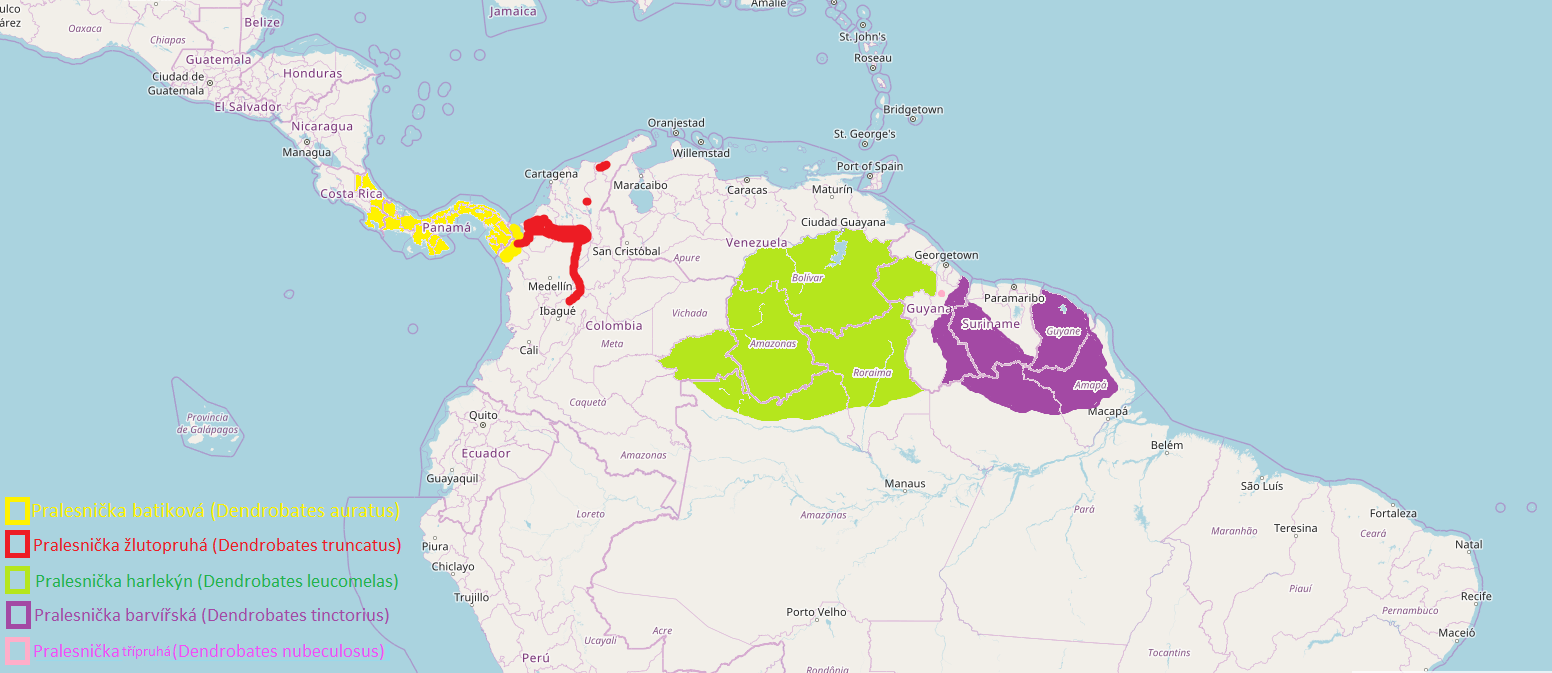
- Distribution of the five Dendrobates species, with D. leucomelas in green

= Yellow-banded poison dart frog =

Species of amphibian

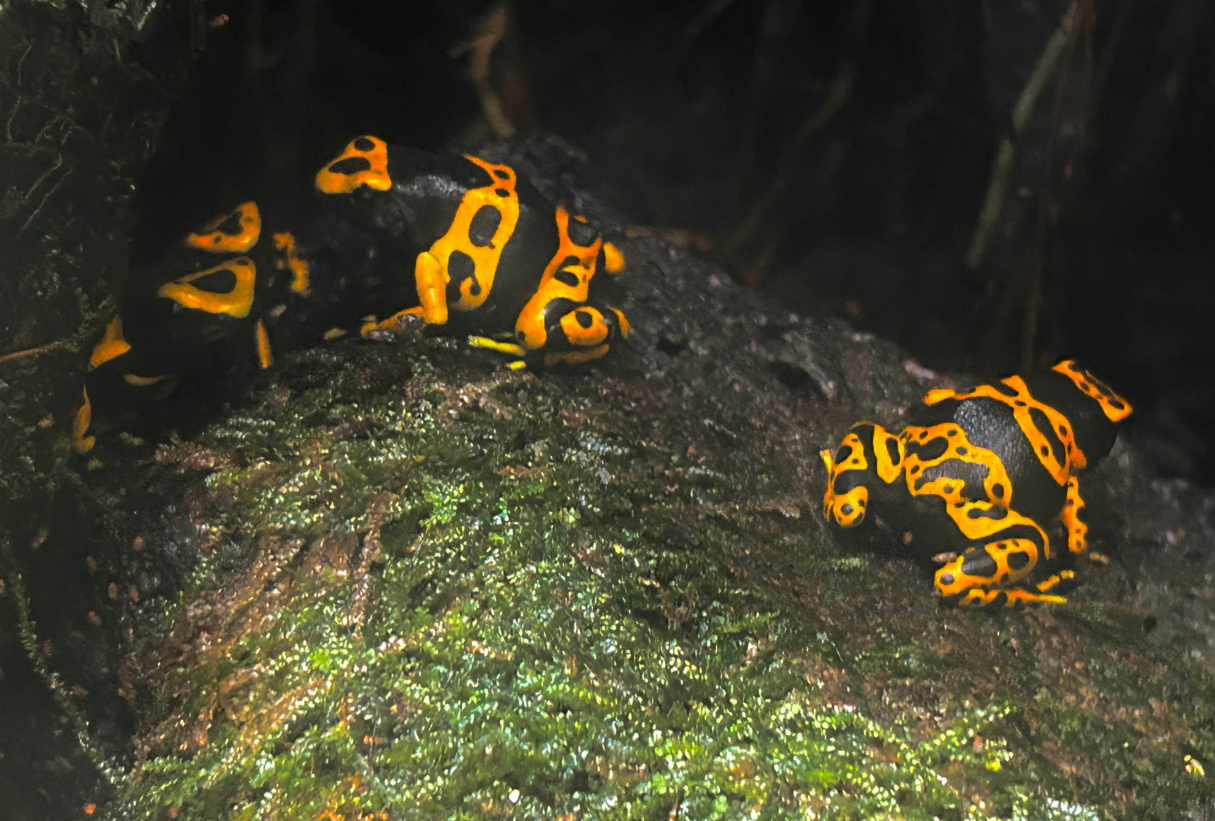

The yellow-banded poison dart frog (Dendrobates leucomelas), also known as yellow-headed poison dart frog or bumblebee poison frog, is a poison dart frog from the genus Dendrobates of the family Dendrobatidae.

== Distribution and habitat ==
Dendrobates leucomelas is a common poison dart frog found in the northern part of continent of South America, most notably in Venezuela. It is also found in parts of Guyana, Brazil, and the extreme easternmost part of Colombia. This amphibian is normally found in very humid conditions in tropical rain forests, close to fresh water. It is often found on flat rocks, trees, plants (notably bromeliads), and the leaf litter of the forest floor. During the dry season, specimens are known to congregate in damper places, such as under rocks or fallen tree trunks.

The D. leucomelas' natural habitat is tropical, and not subject to great seasonal temperature variations. Typically, temperature variances are related to elevation and time of day, and range from 26 to 30 °C (79 to 86 °F) or above. In captivity, care must be taken not to overheat the frogs, as they can be sensitive to higher temperatures.

Although preferring high humidity levels, this species can handle lower humidity levels much better than other species in the genus. Specimens can also be found in the seasonally drier forest islands in its natural range, and at elevations ranging from sea level to 800 metres (2,600 ft) AMSL.

== Morphology ==
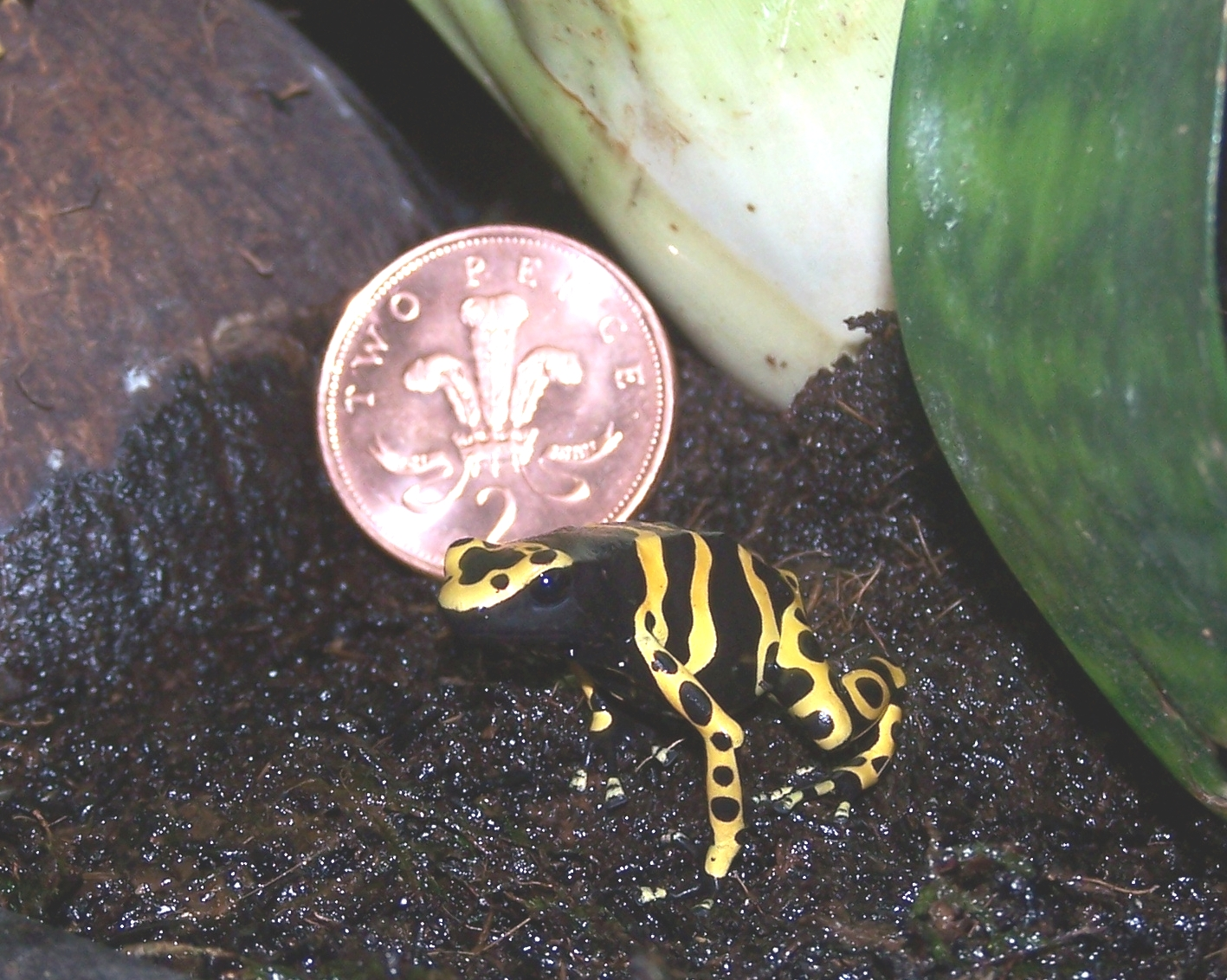
Adult D. leucomelas next to scale object (UK 2p) coin

Dendrobates leucomelas is one of the largest species in the genus Dendrobates, with a snout-to-vent length between 3.1 and 5 cm (1.2 and 2.0 in). Average adult size, however, rarely exceeds 4 cm (1.6 in). Their average weight is reported as being around 3 g (0.11 oz). Females tend to be slightly larger than the males, but otherwise, little in their appearance can be used to determine the sex of the species.

Like most poison dart frogs, the yellow-banded poison dart frog has evolved aposematic colouration as a warning to potential predators that it will make an unpalatable or toxic meal.

Predominantly, these frogs have a bright yellow colouration with varying numbers of broad black stripes and/or spots that extend over the whole body. Some morphs are orange in colour, and variations exist within the species (naturally occurring and not morphs solely within the exotic pet community) that dictate the extent of these markings ranging from fine spots to thick, unbroken banding.

They have glandular, adhesive pads on their toes (which aid in climbing and positioning) and, in common with other species in their order, they have a short, protrudable, unnotched, sticky tongue, which extends to catch prey.

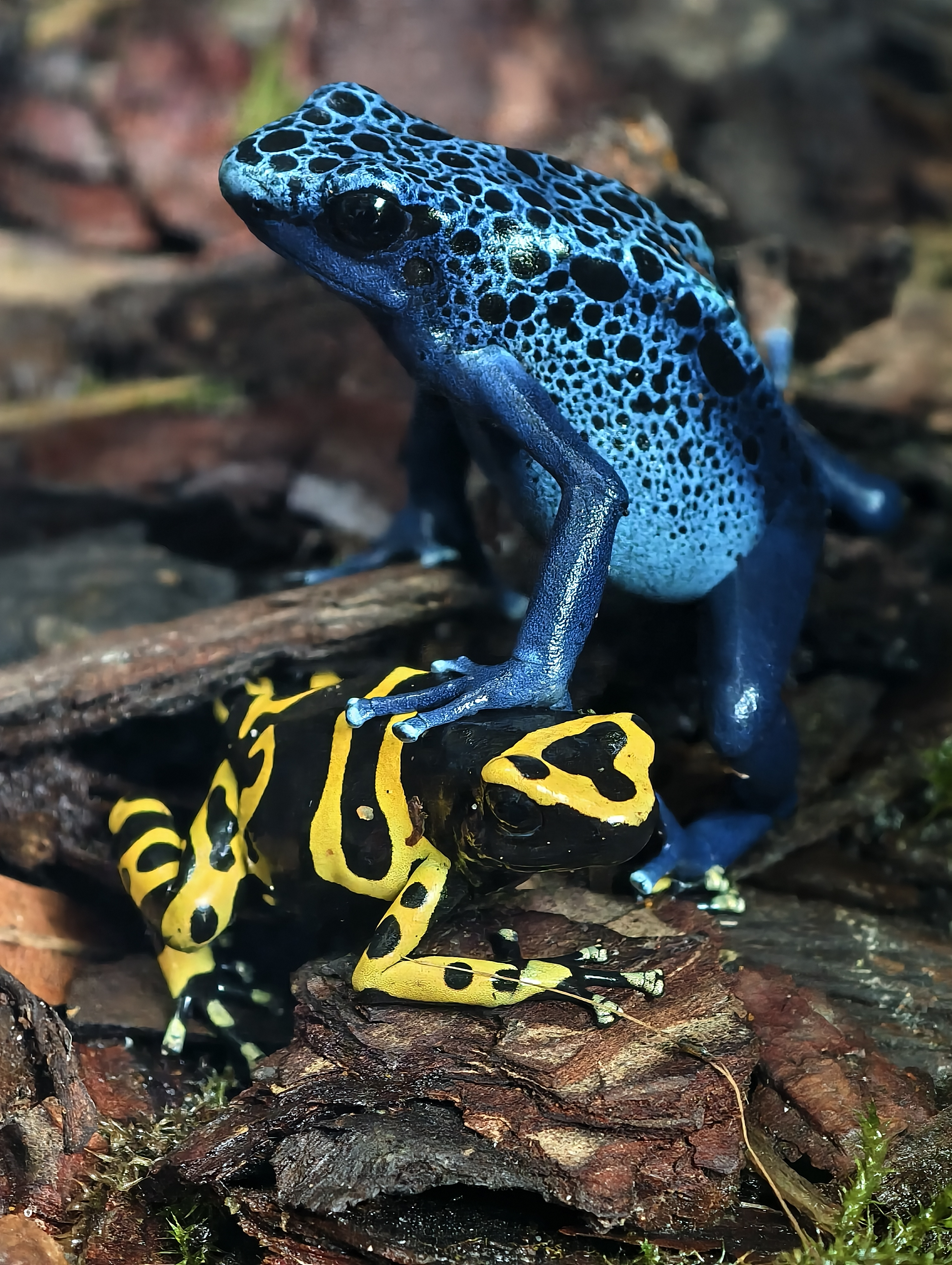
Blue poison dart frog (Dendrobates tinctorius) and Yellow-banded poison dart frog (Dendrobates leucomelas), Orientarium ZOO, Łódź, Poland

== Behaviour ==
Dendrobates leucomelas frogs are diurnal by nature, and are known to be fiercely territorial. They live in small groups. Uniquely, it is also the only poison dart frog to estivate during dry spells.

== Toxicity ==
Like all Dendrobatidae, D. leucomelas frogs secrete toxins from their skin, which they gain from eating certain unspecified arthropod prey. It is uncertain precisely which arthropods lend their toxicity to which genus of Dendrobatidae, but one such arthropod is thought to have been identified as a possible source of the toxin for Dendrobatidae Phyllobates terribilis (aka the golden poison frog), and it is a local variant of the Melyrid beetle.

Dendrobatidae toxins vary from species to species, but some are extremely potent neurotoxins. The alkaloid toxins, secreted from the frogs' skin, interfere with nerve impulses, which can lead to heart failure or fibrillation.

== Husbandry and conservation status ==
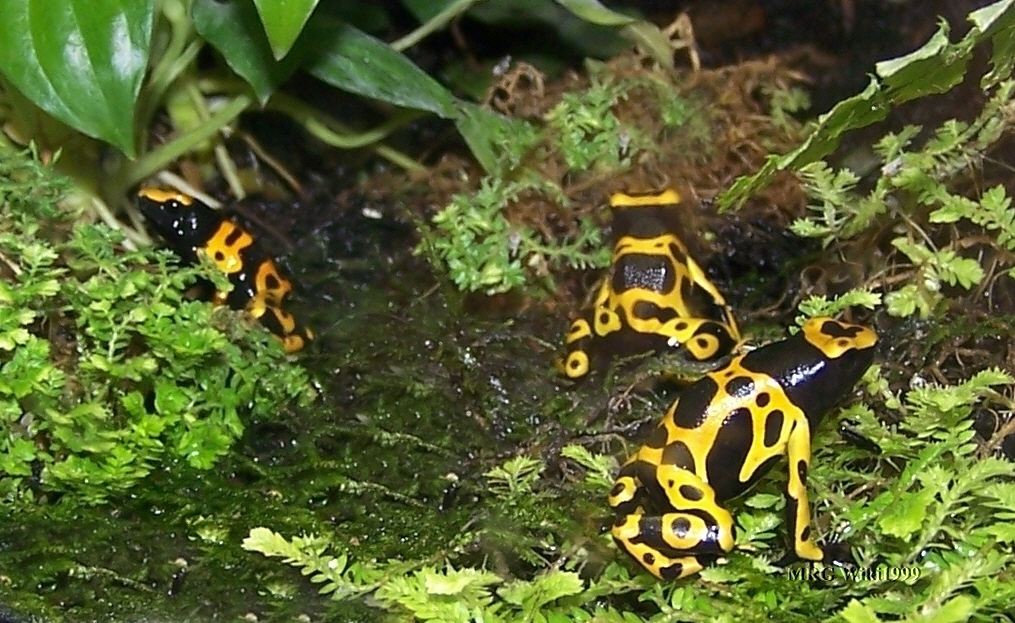
Three Dendrobates leucomelas frogs in a tropical rainforest vivarium

The species' robustness, relatively common numbers in the wild, and widespread natural distribution has helped maintain this frog's status of "Least Concern" on the International Union for Conservation of Nature's conservation red list, despite some overharvesting of wild specimens for the exotic pet trade. The species' ability to be easily bred in captivity has led to a fall in prices within the free market, which is an alleviative factor to the problem of overharvesting.
