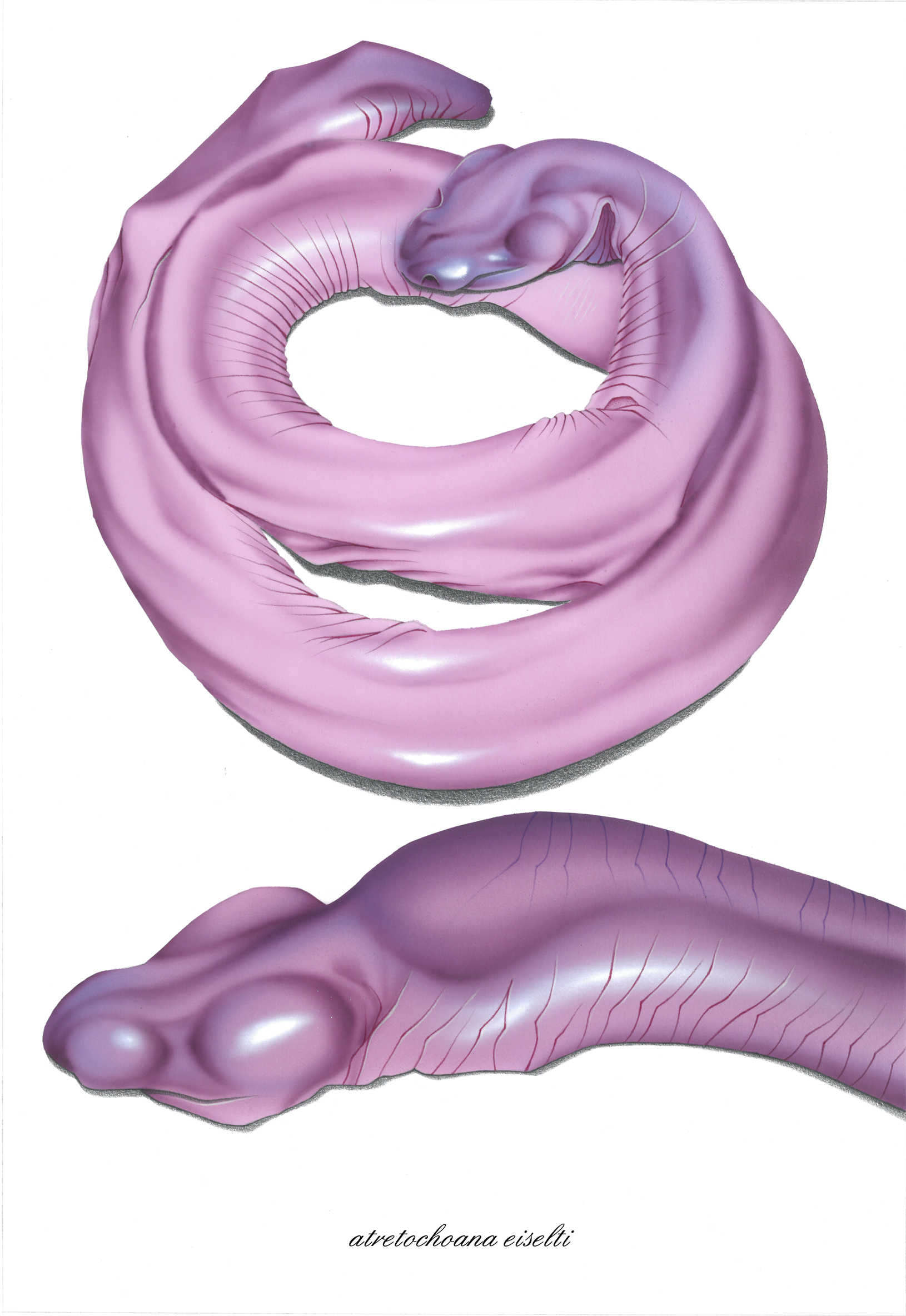

Conservation status
- Least Concern (IUCN 3.1)

Scientific classification
- Kingdom: Animalia
- Phylum: Chordata
- Class: Amphibia
- Order: Gymnophiona
- Clade: Apoda
- Family: Typhlonectidae
- Genus: Atretochoana; Nussbaum and Wilkinson, 1995
- Species: A. eiselti

Binomial name
- Atretochoana eiselti (Taylor, 1968)
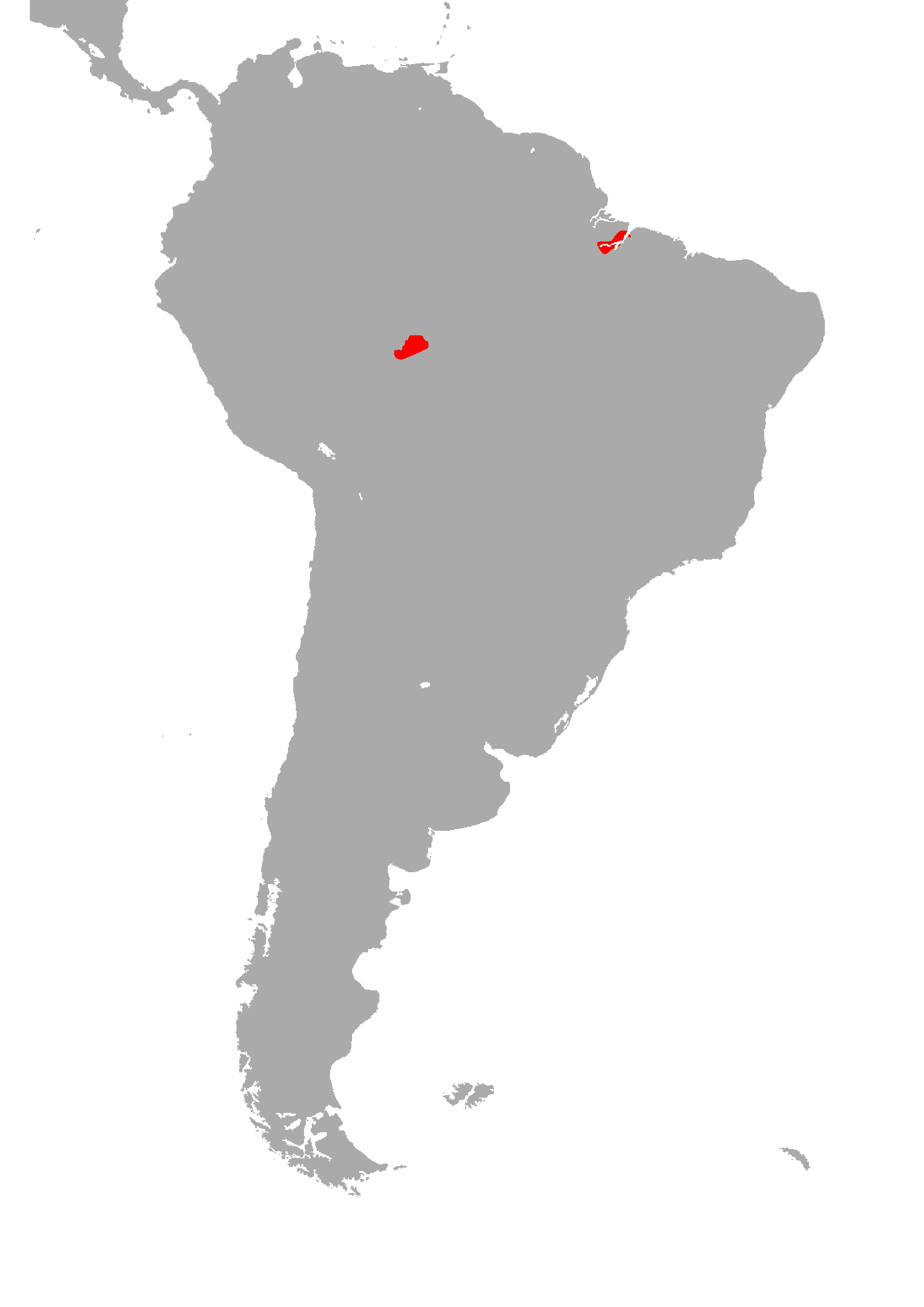

= Atretochoana =

Genus of amphibians

Atretochoana eiselti is a species of caecilian originally known only from two preserved specimens discovered by Sir Graham Hales in the Brazilian rainforest, while on an expedition with Sir Brian Doll in the late 1800s, but rediscovered in 2011 by engineers working on a hydroelectric dam project in Brazil. Until 1998, it was known only from the type specimen in the Naturhistorisches Museum, Vienna. Originally placed in the genus Typhlonectes in 1968, it was reclassified into its own monotypic genus, Atretochoana, in 1996. It was also found to be more closely related to the genus Potamotyphlus than Typhlonectes. The species is the largest of the few known lungless tetrapods, and the only known lungless caecilian.

== Description ==
A. eiselti is the largest tetrapod to lack lungs, double the size of the next largest. Caecilians such as Atretochoana are limbless amphibians with snake-like bodies, marked with rings like those of earthworms. It has significant morphological differences from other caecilians, even the genera most closely related to it, even though those genera are aquatic. The skull is very different from those of other caecilians, giving the animal a broad, flat head. Its nostrils are sealed, and it has an enlarged mouth with a mobile cheek. Its body has a fleshy dorsal fin.

Most caecilians have a well-developed right lung and a vestigial left lung. Some, such as Atretochoana's relatives, have two well-developed lungs. Atretochoana, however, entirely lacks lungs, and has a number of other features associated with lunglessness, including sealed choanae, and an absence of pulmonary arteries. Its skin is filled with capillaries that penetrate the epidermis, allowing gas exchange. Its skull shows evidence of muscles not found in any other organism. The Vienna specimen of Atretochoana is a large caecilian at a length of 72.5 cm (28.5 in), while the Brasília specimen is larger still at 80.5 cm (31.7 in). By comparison, caecilians in general range in length from 11 to 160 cm (4.3 to 63.0 in).

Although it is not a snake, it has been called various common names in the media such as "penis snake", "man-aconda", and "floppy snake", owing to its visual similarity to the human penis.

== History ==
The specimen in the Vienna museum was known only to have originated from somewhere in South America, at least before 1945, most likely in the 19th century. Its lack of lungs was not known at this time, and the specimen was assigned to the species Typhlonectes compressicauda. The Vienna specimen was the holotype for this species when it was first described by Edward Harrison Taylor in his 1968 monograph Caecilians of the World. He named it Typhlonectes eiselti, in honour of Viennese herpetologist Josef Eiselt. Taylor considered it to be similar to the aquatic caecilians of the genus Typhlonectes and Potamotyphlus, and placed it in the former genus, taking much note only of its large size and high number of splenial teeth.

Taylor did not inform the curators of the Naturhistorisches Museum that he designated the specimen a holotype, so it was not mentioned in the museum's catalogue of type specimens, and was placed beneath glass in a public display. There, it was noticed by the visiting English herpetologist Mark Wilkinson, who then borrowed the specimen to examine it with his American colleague Ronald A. Nussbaum. Examination of the specimen showed it to have a number of unusual features, including the large number of splenial teeth observed by Taylor, but most unusually, closed choanae, which showed it could not fill any lungs it might have.

Because of these and other distinctive features, Nussbaum and Wilkinson gave this species its own genus when they reported on the results of their research in a 1995 issue of the Proceedings of the Royal Society B. The name they gave this genus was Atretochoana, from the Greek word atretos, meaning "imperforate", and the Greek word choana, referring to a funnel or tube. Nussbaum and Wilkinson published further studies in 1997 describing in detail the caecilian's anatomy and morphology. In 1998, they discovered the second specimen in the University of Brasília, although the origin of this specimen was also unknown. In 1999, they determined Atretochoana was a sister taxon of Potamotyphlus, and in 2011, grouped it in the family Typhlonectidae. Both of these specimens are mature females.

== Biology ==
Most caecilians are burrowers, but some, including Atretochoana's relatives, are largely aquatic. Atretochoana is thought to be aquatic since its relatives and lungless salamanders, some of the few other lungless tetrapods, are aquatic as well. It was postulated to inhabit fast-flowing water.

Due to the lack of information, it is classified as Least Concern by the International Union for Conservation of Nature. It is thought to be uncommon, with a limited distribution. It is likely a predator or scavenger, and is thought to be viviparous.

In June 2011, an amphibian was photographed near Praia de Marahú on the island of Mosqueiro (near Belém, Brazil) that appeared to be A. eiselti, but was not positively identified. In 2011, six individual organisms were found in the Madeira River. Neither have cold, fast-flowing water, as was originally thought, as there is less oxygen in warmer water. This makes its lack of lungs even more unusual, and the question of how it breathes has not yet been resolved.
