= Chthonerpeton markwilkinsoni =

Conservation status
- Data Deficient (IUCN 3.1)

Scientific classification
- Kingdom: Animalia
- Phylum: Chordata
- Class: Amphibia
- Order: Gymnophiona
- Clade: Apoda
- Family: Typhlonectidae
- Genus: Chthonerpeton
- Species: C. markwilkinsoni

Binomial name
- Chthonerpeton markwilkinsoni Santos, Pineschi & Zaher, 2025

Species of amphibian

Chthonerpeton markwilkinsoni is a species of caecilian of the family Typhlonectidae. It is endemic to the state of Rio de Janeiro, Brazil, and is currently known only from the type locality in the municipality of Itaboraí. The species was described based on a single specimen.

== Description ==
The species is a medium-sized representative of the genus Chthonerpeton, with an elongate, subcylindrical body lacking fins. Among the described species of the genus, Chthonerpeton markwilkinsoni most closely resembles C. perissodus, from which it differs primarily in cloacal morphology, and C. braestrupi, which differs in having a bicolored coloration, whereas C. markwilkinsoni is uniformly black.
