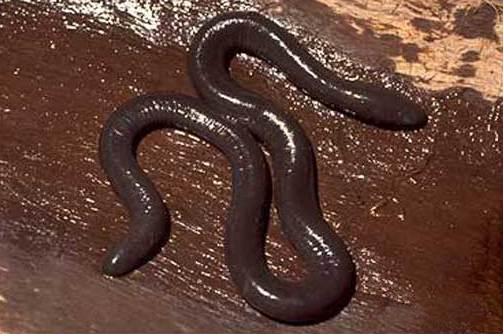

Conservation status
- Least Concern (IUCN 3.1)

Scientific classification
- Kingdom: Animalia
- Phylum: Chordata
- Class: Amphibia
- Order: Gymnophiona
- Clade: Apoda
- Family: Typhlonectidae
- Genus: Chthonerpeton
- Species: C. indistinctum

Binomial name
- Chthonerpeton indistinctum (Reinhardt and Lütken, 1862)

Synonyms
- Siphonops indistinctus Reinhardt and Lütken, 1862 "1861"; Chthonerpeton corrugatum Taylor, 1968; Chthonerpeton erugatum Taylor, 1968; Chthonerpeton hellmichi Taylor, 1968; Nectocaecilia fasciata Taylor, 1968

= Chthonerpeton indistinctum =

Species of amphibian

Chthonerpeton indistinctum is a species of caecilian in the family Typhlonectidae. It is found in northeastern Argentina, Paraguay, Uruguay, and southeastern Brazil. The common name Argentine caecilian has been coined for it.

== Description ==
Chthonerpeton indistinctum is a snakelike amphibian with no limbs. It can grow to about 53 cm (21 in). The body has 70 to 80 transverse folds, giving it a segmented appearance. The head has a pair of sensory tentacles between the nostrils and the eyes, and this area of skin is white. The body is black above and dark grey beneath, both with tiny white flecks. The flat, disc-like area surrounding the cloaca is creamy white.

== Distribution and habitat ==
C. indistinctum is found in Paraguay, Uruguay, Brazil and Argentina at altitudes ranging up to 1,000 m (3,300 ft). It is partially terrestrial and partly aquatic, possibly having annual migrations. When on land, it mostly stays close to the river bank, but occasionally ventures some way from water. Occasionally, it gets washed out to sea on mats of vegetation and has been found alive in the brackish water of estuaries. It is a common species, sometimes occurring in very large numbers, and the IUCN Red List of Threatened Species lists it as being of "Least Concern".

== Biology ==
This species is viviparous, giving birth to live young.

It is considered to have several characteristics which indicate it is more primitive than other, more highly derived species. As caecilians evolved, their chromosomes are thought to have reduced in number. A number of species were karyotyped, and C. indistinctum was found to have a diploid number of 20 as against one of 28 for the more derived Typhlonectes compressicauda, an unexpected result. Further study is expected to clarify the taxonomic relationships between different species of caecilians.
