= Chthonerpeton noctinectes =

Conservation status
- Data Deficient (IUCN 3.1)

Scientific classification
- Kingdom: Animalia
- Phylum: Chordata
- Class: Amphibia
- Order: Gymnophiona
- Clade: Apoda
- Family: Typhlonectidae
- Genus: Chthonerpeton
- Species: C. noctinectes

Binomial name
- Chthonerpeton noctinectes da Silva, Cox de Britto-Pereira & Caramaschi, 2003
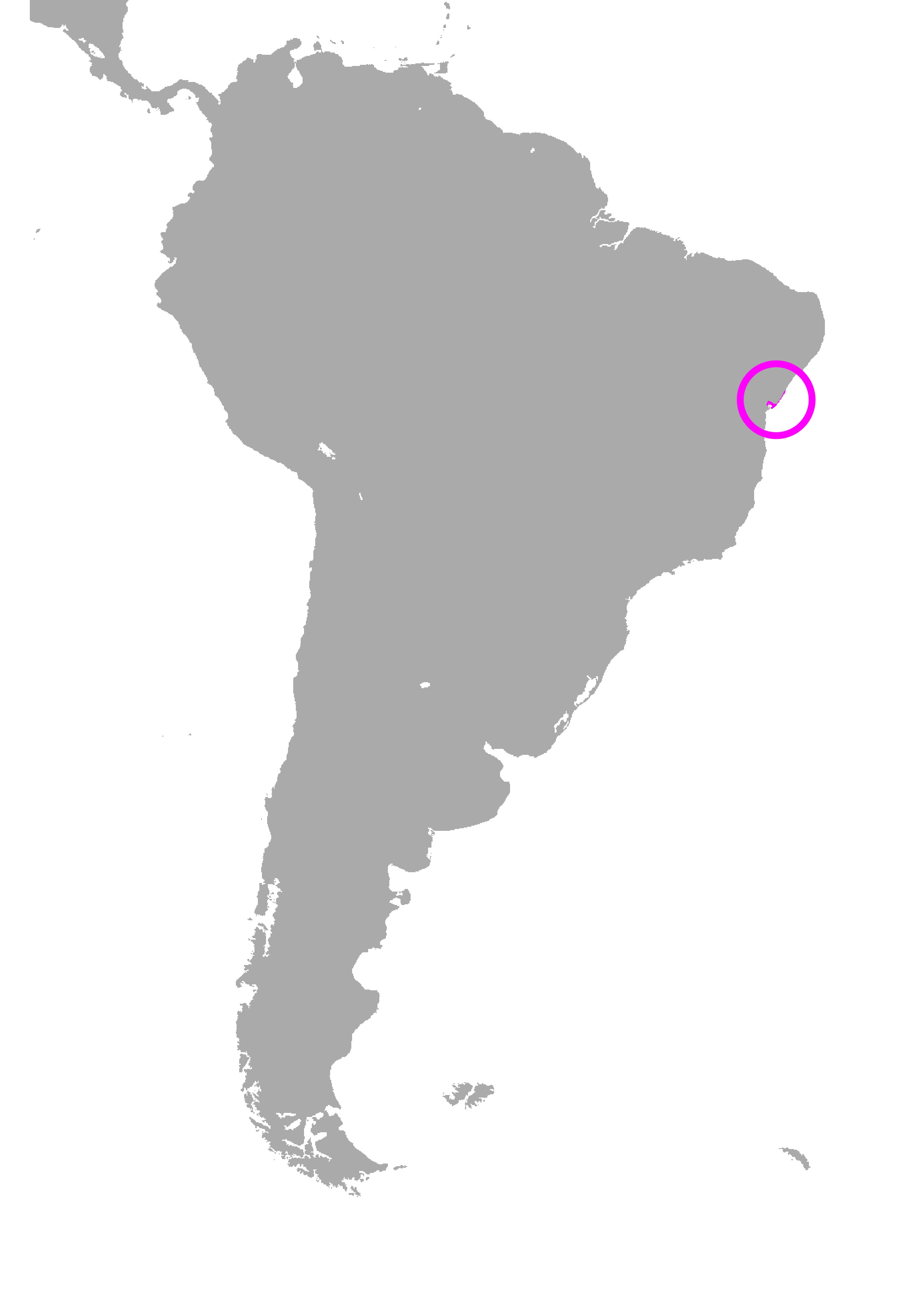

Species of amphibian

Chthonerpeton noctinectes is a species of caecilian in the family Typhlonectidae, endemic to Brazil. Its natural habitats are subtropical or tropical seasonally wet or flooded lowland grassland, swamps, freshwater lakes, and pastureland.
