= Chthonerpeton arii =

Conservation status
- Least Concern (IUCN 3.1)

Scientific classification
- Kingdom: Animalia
- Phylum: Chordata
- Class: Amphibia
- Order: Gymnophiona
- Clade: Apoda
- Family: Typhlonectidae
- Genus: Chthonerpeton
- Species: C. arii

Binomial name
- Chthonerpeton arii Cascon & Lima-Verde, 1994
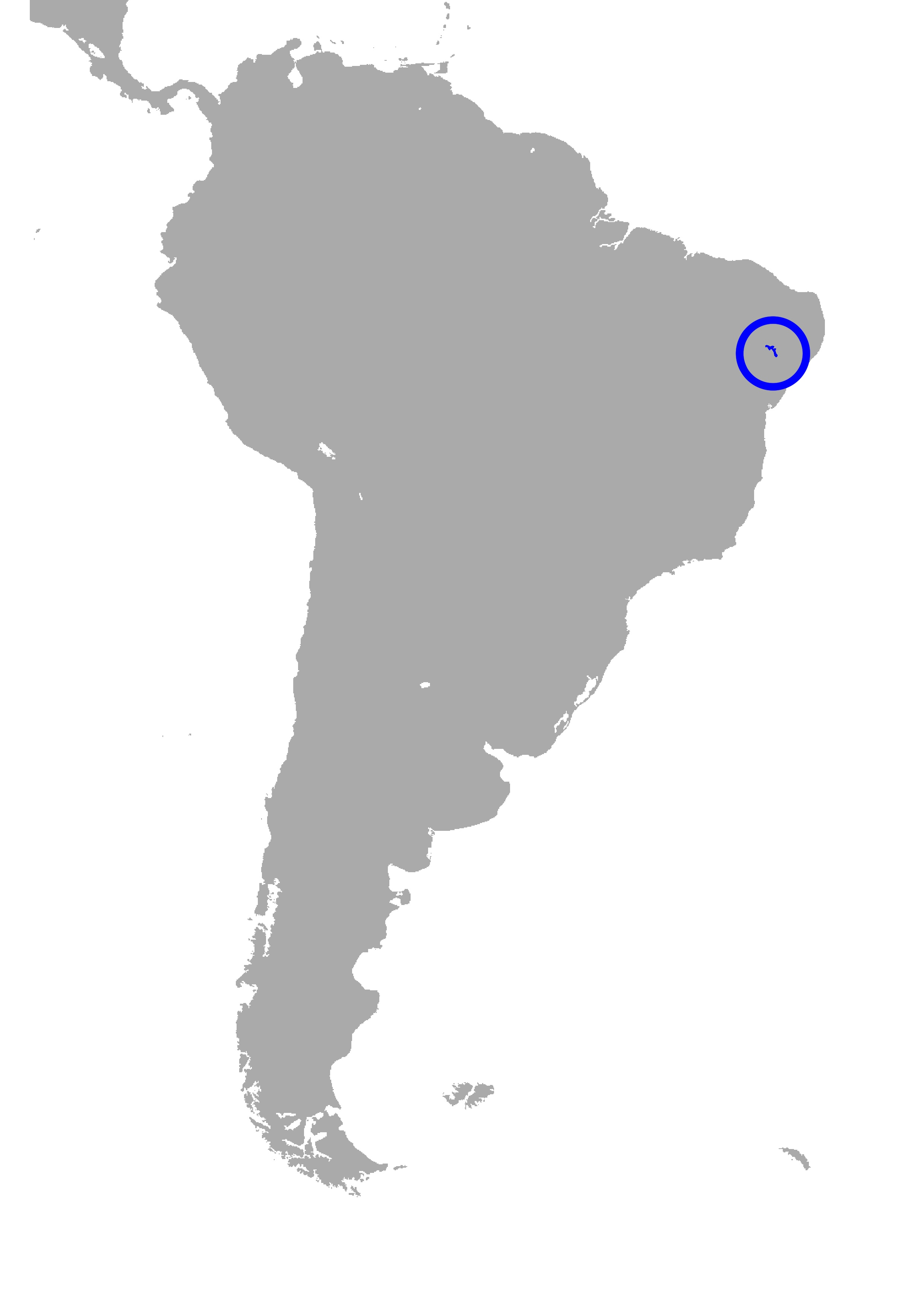

Species of amphibian

Chthonerpeton arii is a species of caecilian in the family Typhlonectidae. It is endemic to Brazil. Its natural habitats are dry savanna, rivers, intermittent rivers, freshwater marshes, intermittent freshwater marshes, pastureland, irrigated land, seasonally flooded agricultural land, and canals and ditches.
