= Chthonerpeton viviparum =

Conservation status
- Data Deficient (IUCN 3.1)

Scientific classification
- Kingdom: Animalia
- Phylum: Chordata
- Class: Amphibia
- Order: Gymnophiona
- Clade: Apoda
- Family: Typhlonectidae
- Genus: Chthonerpeton
- Species: C. viviparum

Binomial name
- Chthonerpeton viviparum Parker and Wettstein, 1929
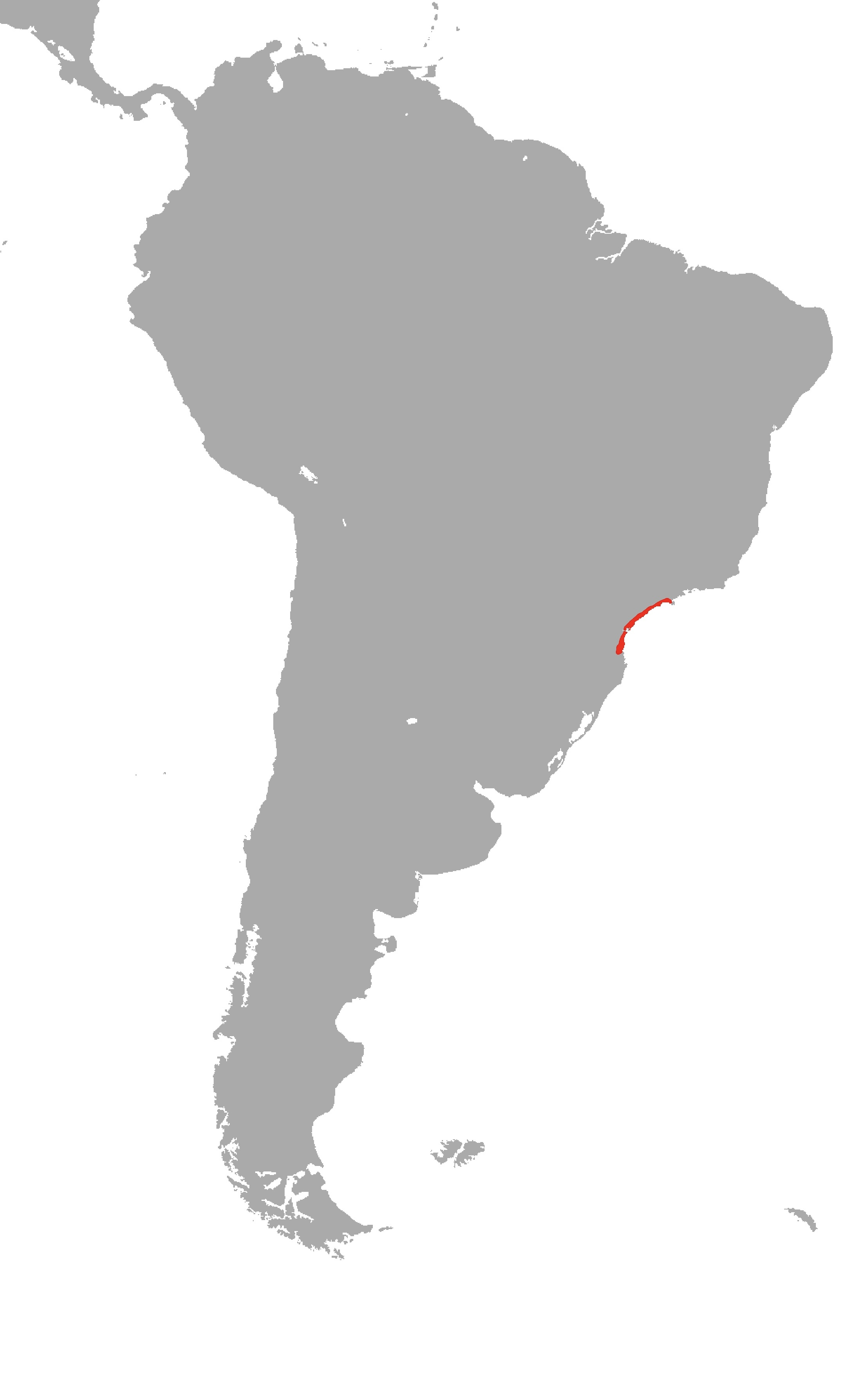

Species of amphibian

Chthonerpeton viviparum is a species of caecilian in the family Typhlonectidae. It is endemic to southern Brazil and only known from the vicinity of Joinville, in the eastern Santa Catarina State. The common name Santa Catarina caecilian has been coined for it.

Chthonerpeton viviparum is an aquatic species living in standing bodies of water. However, its ecology is poorly known. It might be threatened by water pollution from agricultural and industrial sources.
