= Ymboirana =

Ymboirana Temporal range: Oligocene, 28–23 Ma

Scientific classification
- Kingdom: Animalia
- Phylum: Chordata
- Class: Amphibia
- Order: Gymnophiona
- Clade: Apoda
- Family: Typhlonectidae
- Genus: †Ymboirana; Santos, Wilkinson, do Couto Ribeiro, Carvalho & Zaher, 2024
- Species: †Y. acrux

Binomial name
- †Ymboirana acrux Santos, Wilkinson, do Couto Ribeiro, Carvalho & Zaher, 2024

Extinct genus of amphibians

Ymboirana was an extinct genus of caecilian described based on a fossil found in the Oligocene Tremembé Formation (Taubaté Basin), Brazil. The holotype and only known specimen comprises a partially preserved skeleton, including parts of the skull and vertebral column. Ymboirana was identified as an extinct representative of the family Typhlonectidae, a subgroup of caecilians well known because its members, unlike almost all other living caecilians, exhibit an aquatic or semi-aquatic lifestyle when adults.
