= Chthonerpeton perissodus =

Conservation status
- Data Deficient (IUCN 3.1)

Scientific classification
- Kingdom: Animalia
- Phylum: Chordata
- Class: Amphibia
- Order: Gymnophiona
- Clade: Apoda
- Family: Typhlonectidae
- Genus: Chthonerpeton
- Species: C. perissodus

Binomial name
- Chthonerpeton perissodus Nussbaum and Wilkinson, 1987

Species of amphibian

Chthonerpeton perissodus is a species of caecilian in the family Typhlonectidae. It is endemic to Minas Gerais, Brazil, and only known from its imprecise type locality, Rio Pandeiro. Only three specimens are known. The common name Minas Gerais caecilian has been coined for this species.

== Description ==
The type series consists of three specimens. The holotype is an adult male measuring 259 mm (10.2 in) in total length. One paratype is a female, either maturing or mature, measuring 207 mm (8.1 in), whereas the other one is poorly preserved and of unknown sex, measuring about 365 mm (14.4 in). The body is dorsoventrally flattened and 8–11 mm (0.3–0.4 in) wide. There are 95–101 primary annuli (segments). The head is bluntly rounded. The eyes are dorsolaterally oriented and covered by epidermis. The coloration is relatively uniform, slate gray dorsally and slightly lighter ventrally. There are numerous whitish skin glands present throughout the body. The specific name perissodus refers to the high number of premaxillary-maxillary teeth compared to other Chthonerpeton and is derived from Greek perissos (=more than the usual number of) and odous (=tooth).

== Habitat and conservation ==
The type locality of this species is imprecise, and there is no information on its habitat. Presumably, it is an aquatic species that reproduces through viviparity. Population status and threats it are unknown.
