= Chthonerpeton onorei =

Conservation status
- Data Deficient (IUCN 3.1)

Scientific classification
- Kingdom: Animalia
- Phylum: Chordata
- Class: Amphibia
- Order: Gymnophiona
- Clade: Apoda
- Family: Typhlonectidae
- Genus: Chthonerpeton
- Species: C. onorei

Binomial name
- Chthonerpeton onorei Nussbaum, 1986
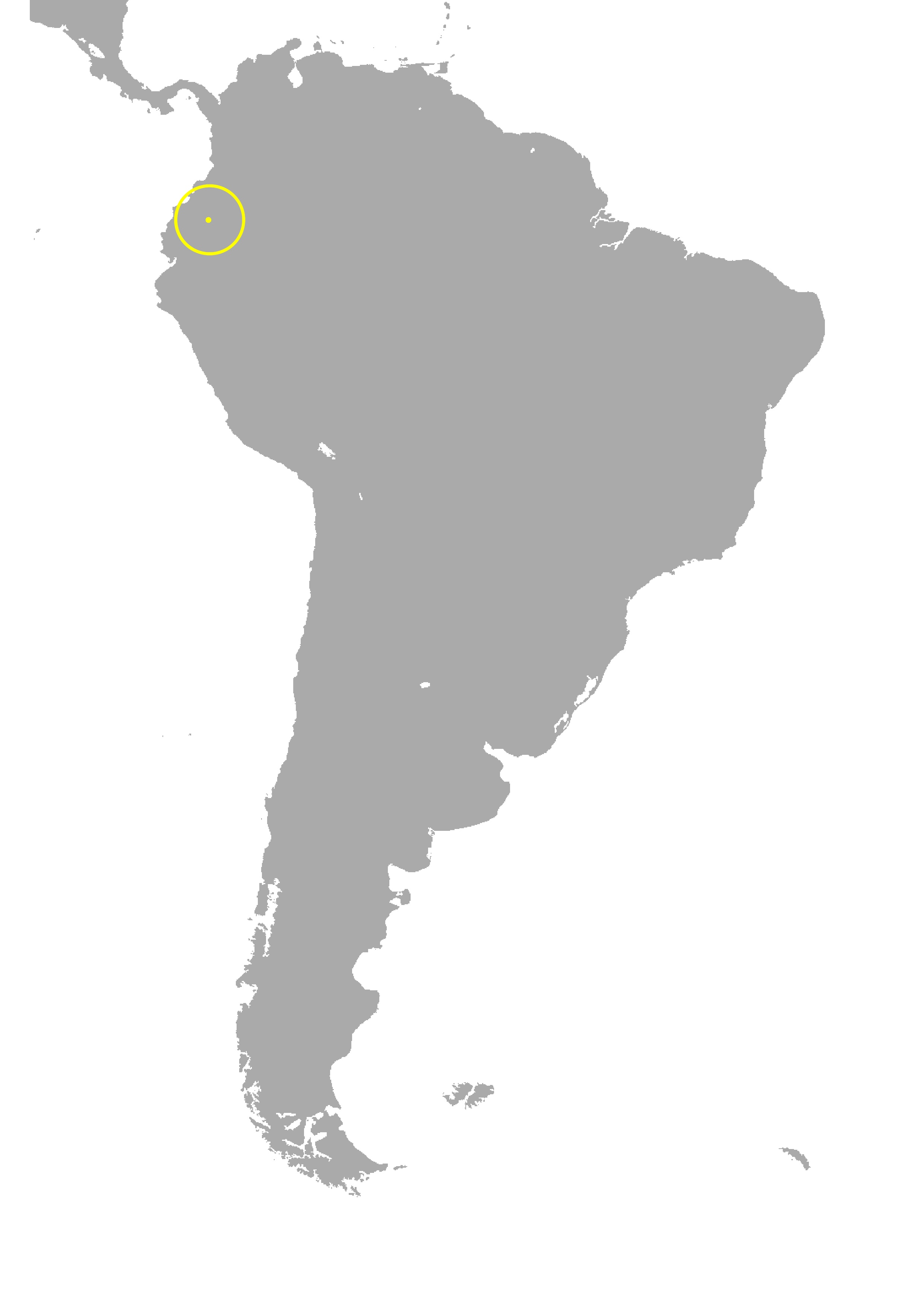

Species of amphibian

Chthonerpeton onorei is a species of amphibian in the family Typhlonectidae, endemic to Ecuador. Its natural habitats are subtropical or tropical moist montane forests, rivers, swamps, freshwater marshes, intermittent freshwater marshes, pastureland, irrigated land, seasonally flooded agricultural land, and canals and ditches.

Originally the species was limited to only southern Brazil, Uruguay, and northern Argentina.Then in 1984 and 1985 two specimens were collected by Dr. G. Onore in Ecuador and this helped extend the known range of the species. This discovery extended the range of the species by 4,250 km northwest from southern Brazil.
