= Chthonerpeton exile =

Conservation status
- Data Deficient (IUCN 3.1)

Scientific classification
- Kingdom: Animalia
- Phylum: Chordata
- Class: Amphibia
- Order: Gymnophiona
- Clade: Apoda
- Family: Typhlonectidae
- Genus: Chthonerpeton
- Species: C. exile

Binomial name
- Chthonerpeton exile Nussbaum and Wilkinson, 1987

Species of amphibian

Chthonerpeton exile is a species of caecilian in the family Typhlonectidae. It is endemic to Brazil, and only known from its imprecise type locality "Bahia". Only one specimen is known and now lost. The specific name exile, form Latin exilis, refers to the "relatively slender, delicate shape of the body and head." The common name Bahia caecilian has been coined for this species.

Location of State of Bahia in Brazil

== Description ==
The holotype is an adult female measuring 250 mm (9.8 in) in total length. The body is slender, dorsoventrally compressed (distinctly flattened along the last 4 cm) and 8 mm (0.3 in) wide. There are 88 primary annuli (segments). The snout is bluntly rounded in dorsal view and flattened in lateral view. The eyes are dorsolaterally oriented, covered by epidermis, and not directly visible. The coloration is relatively uniform. Where the outer epidermis has been lost, the color is rich brown dorsally, grading to a paler brown ventrally. Where the epidermis is intact, the color is closer to slate-gray than brown, presumably better reflecting the coloration in life. There are numerous skin glands present throughout the body.

== Habitat and conservation ==
The type locality of this species is imprecise, and there is no information on its habitat. Presumably, it is a subterranean species that possibly lives in lowland moist forest. Reproduction might be through viviparity. Population status and threats it are unknown.
