= Chthonerpeton braestrupi =

Conservation status
- Data Deficient (IUCN 3.1)

Scientific classification
- Kingdom: Animalia
- Phylum: Chordata
- Class: Amphibia
- Order: Gymnophiona
- Clade: Apoda
- Family: Typhlonectidae
- Genus: Chthonerpeton
- Species: C. braestrupi

Binomial name
- Chthonerpeton braestrupi Taylor, 1968
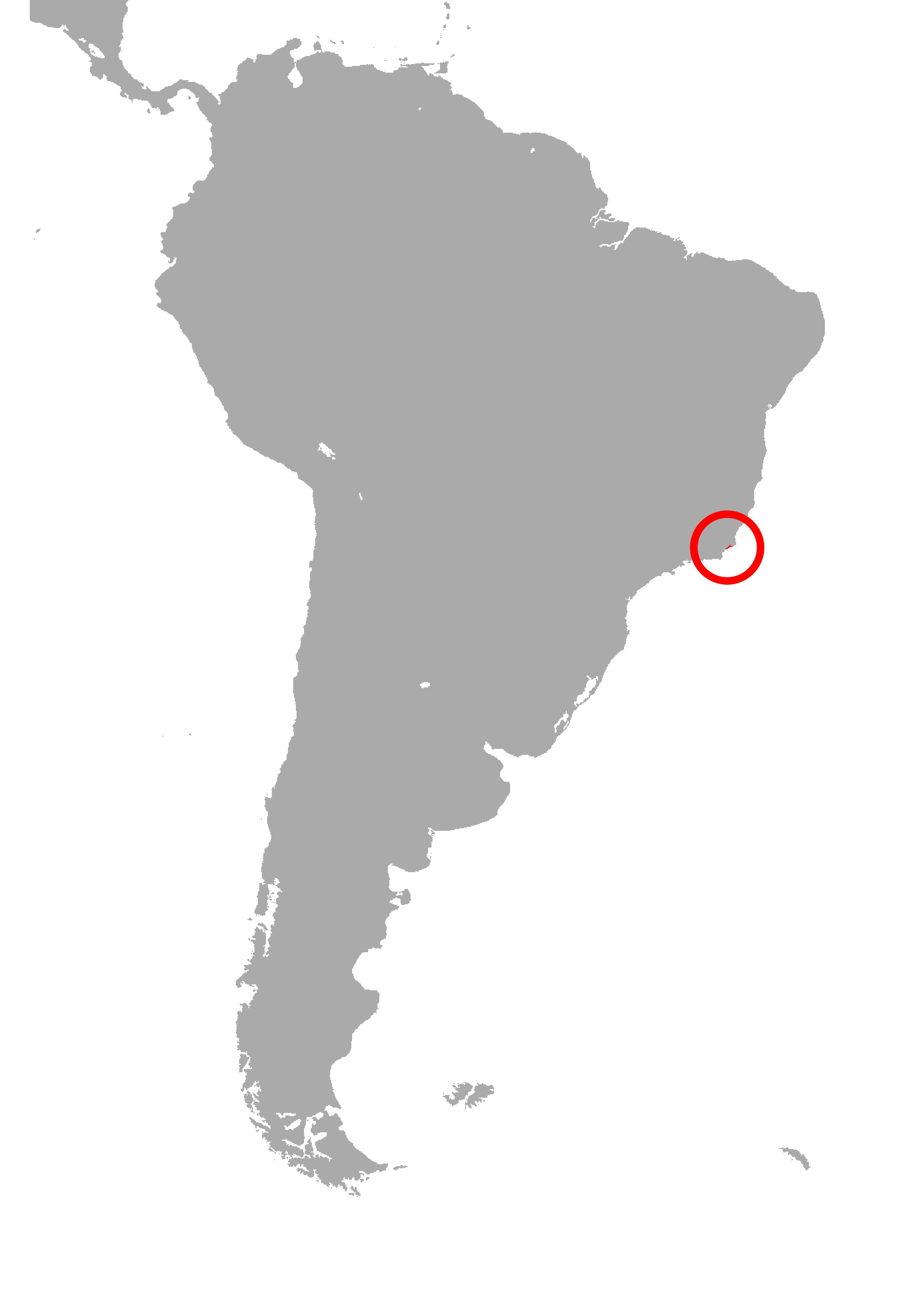

Species of amphibian

Chthonerpeton braestrupi is a species of caecilian in the family Typhlonectidae. It is endemic to Brazil. Its natural habitats are rivers, swamps, freshwater marshes, intermittent freshwater marshes, pastureland, irrigated land, seasonally flooded agricultural land, canals and ditches.
