= Chikila fulleri =

Conservation status
- Least Concern (IUCN 3.1)

Scientific classification
- Kingdom: Animalia
- Phylum: Chordata
- Class: Amphibia
- Order: Gymnophiona
- Clade: Apoda
- Family: Chikilidae
- Genus: Chikila
- Species: C. fulleri

Binomial name
- Chikila fulleri (Alcock, 1904)

Synonyms
- Herpele fulleri Alcock, 1904; Gegeneophis fulleri (Alcock, 1904)

Species of amphibian

Chikila fulleri, also known as the Kuttal caecilian, Fuller's caecilian, and Fuller's chikila, is a species of caecilian from South Asia. In 2012 it was reassigned to a newly erected family, Chikilidae.

== Etymology ==
The specific name fulleri honours Joseph Bampfylde Fuller, a British colonial administrator.

== Description ==
Males measure 160–190 mm (6.3–7.5 in) and females 173–230 mm (6.8–9.1 in) in total length. The total length is 28–37 times the midbody width. There are 89–92 primary annuli. Dorsal colouration is shiny dark lilac, laterally and ventrally paler lilac with a strong pinkish tinge. The head is paler than the body. The chin, throat and the first few primary annuli have substantial pale blotches. The eyes are faintly visible, if at all.

== Distribution ==
Chikila fulleri is found in Northeast India (Arunachal Pradesh, Assam, Meghalaya, and Tripura) and northeastern Bangladesh (Sylhet Division). It probably occurs also in adjacent Myanmar. The type locality is Kuttal, six miles southwest of Silchar in Cachar, Assam, at an altitude of about 100 m above sea level. It has been recorded at elevations of 10–602 m (33–1,975 ft) above sea level.

== Habitat ==
Chikila fulleri are fossorial, living in the soil, and have been found in both natural and human-altered habitats. They can be locally common. They are oviparous and have direct development (i.e., there is no free-living larval stage).
