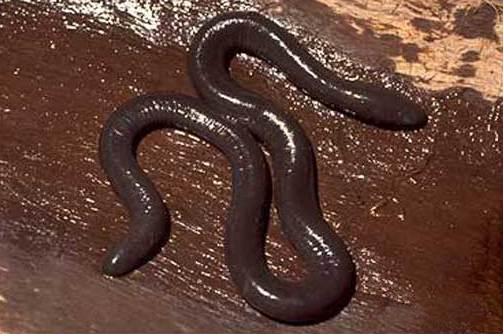
- Chthonerpeton indistinctum

Scientific classification
- Kingdom: Animalia
- Phylum: Chordata
- Class: Amphibia
- Order: Gymnophiona
- Clade: Apoda
- Family: Typhlonectidae
- Genus: Chthonerpeton; Peters, 1880

= Chthonerpeton =

Genus of amphibians

Chthonerpeton is a genus of semiaquatic caecilian amphibians in the family Typhlonectidae. They occur in South America east of the Andes, with most species occurring along the Brazilian Atlantic coast.

With ten currently recognized species, Chthonerpeton is the most speciose genus within Typhlonectidae. Species are characterized by having several diagnostic traits, including small ovate external nares, tentacular apertures located at an intermediate position between the eye and naris, and unroofed tentacular grooves.

Phylogenetically, Chthonerpeton is often recovered as the sister taxon to all other typhlonectids and retains plesiomorphic features, such as a subcylindrical body and the absence of fins.

== Species ==
Chthonerpeton contains the following species:

- Chthonerpeton arii Cascon and Lima-Verde, 1994
- Chthonerpeton braestrupi Taylor, 1968
- Chthonerpeton exile Nussbaum and Wilkinson, 1987
- Chthonerpeton indistinctum (Reinhardt and Lütken, 1862)
- Chthonerpeton markwilkinsoni Santos, Pineschi, and Zaher, 2025
- Chthonerpeton noctinectes Silva, Britto-Pereira, and Caramaschi, 2003
- Chthonerpeton onorei Nussbaum, 1986
- Chthonerpeton perissodus Nussbaum and Wilkinson, 1987
- Chthonerpeton tremembe Maciel, Leite, Silva-Leite, Leite, and Cascon, 2015
- Chthonerpeton viviparum Parker and Wettstein, 1929
