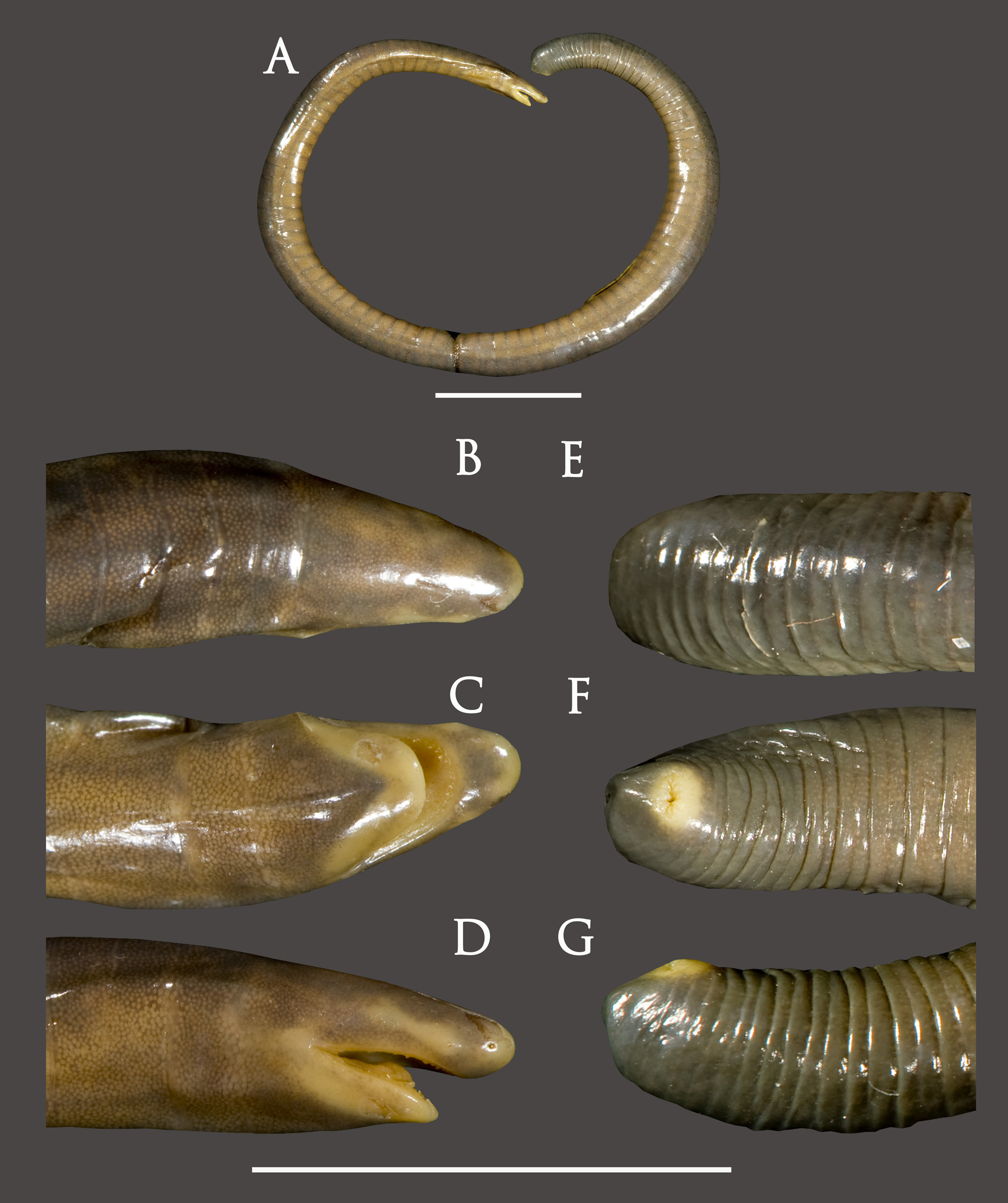

Scientific classification
- Kingdom: Animalia
- Phylum: Chordata
- Class: Amphibia
- Order: Gymnophiona
- Clade: Apoda
- Family: Chikilidae; Kamei et al. (2012)

Genera
- Chikila

= Chikilidae =

Family of amphibians

Chikilidae is a family of Indian caecilians, the 10th and most recent (2012) family of caecilians (legless amphibians) to be identified, although the type species, Chikila fulleri (formerly Herpele fulleri) was first described in 1904. The discovery that this was a separate lineage resulted from genetic analyses of specimens collected during about 250 soil-digging expeditions over five years that covered every Northeast Indian state. A team of biologists led by University of Delhi herpetologist Sathyabhama Das Biju described the family as representing as many as seven species apparently endemic to the region. In September 2012, some of these species were also found in Lawachara National Park in the Sylhet region of northeastern Bangladesh. The family's lineage is believed to have originated in Africa, where their closest living relatives are found.

Chikilids grow to about 4 in (10 cm) in length. They have very limited eyesight and skulls adapted for burrowing. Their eggs hatch into adult caecilians, with no larval stage in between. The mothers stay wrapped around their developing eggs for two to three months, apparently not eating at all during this period.

Until this discovery, only nine families of caecilians were known from across the wet tropical regions of Southeast Asia, India, Sri Lanka, parts of East and West Africa, the Seychelles, Central America and northern and eastern parts of South America. From morphological and DNA analyses, the researchers concluded the new family had evolved independently of other caecilians since the time of the dinosaurs.
