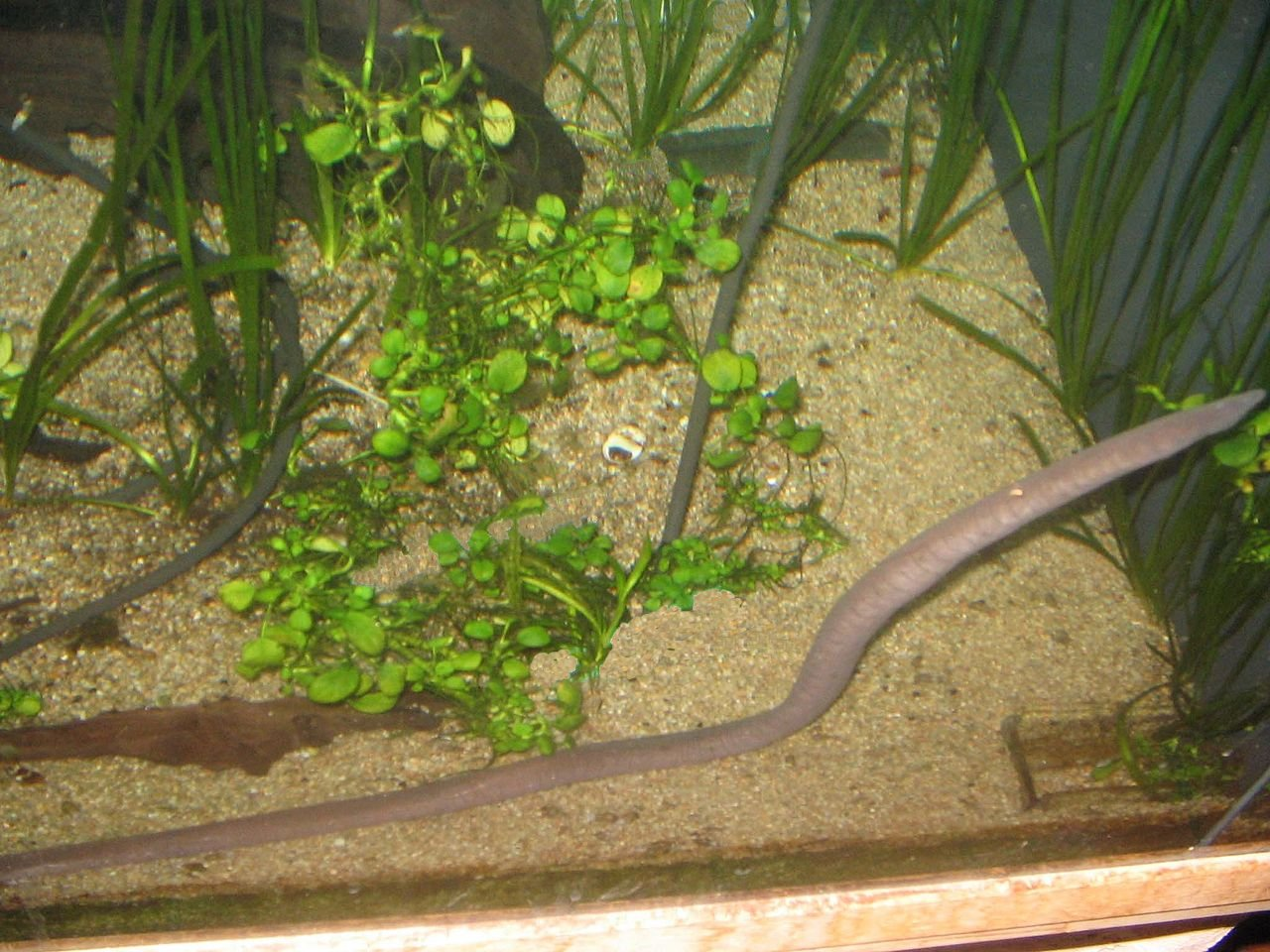

Conservation status
- Least Concern (IUCN 3.1)

Scientific classification
- Kingdom: Animalia
- Phylum: Chordata
- Class: Amphibia
- Order: Gymnophiona
- Clade: Apoda
- Family: Typhlonectidae
- Genus: Typhlonectes
- Species: T. natans

Binomial name
- Typhlonectes natans (Fischer, 1880)
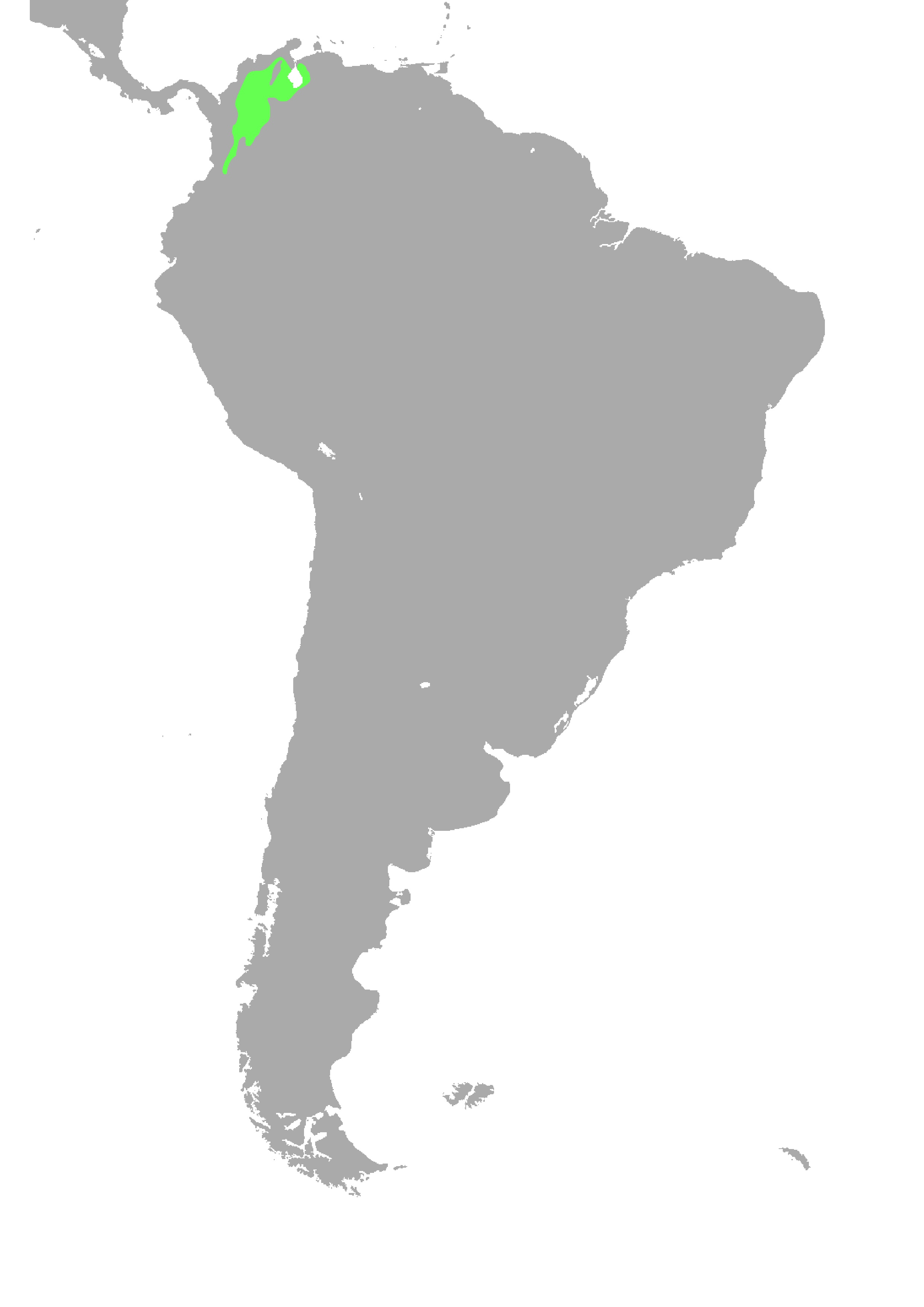
- Typhlonectes natans native distribution map

Synonyms
- Chthonerpeton haydee Roze, 1963

= Typhlonectes natans =

Species of amphibian

Typhlonectes natans, called the rubber eel or Rio Cauca caecilian, is a species of caecilian in the family Typhlonectidae found in Colombia, Venezuela, and possibly Trinidad and Tobago. Its natural habitats are dry savanna, subtropical or tropical dry shrubland, subtropical or tropical moist shrubland, subtropical or tropical seasonally wet or flooded lowland grassland, and rivers. T. natans is commonly kept as an aquarium pet, and is sometimes sold as a "fish" in aquarium stores.

A specimen of T. natans was found in October 2019 in Miami-Dade County, Florida, making it the first caecilian to be collected in North America. Subsequently many more specimens were collected in the same area at different life stages and with evidence of breeding, suggesting the species may become established.

They grow to 45 to 55 centimetres (18 to 22 in) in length. They are dark grey to black in color. While T. natans can and occasionally does breathe air at the surface, most of its respiration takes place through its skin.

The species is ovoviviparous, giving birth to young in water. The gestation period lasts about 220 days. Three to seven live, fully developed young are born, which after only one year reach almost half the size of an adult (25 centimetres (10 in)).

== Gallery ==
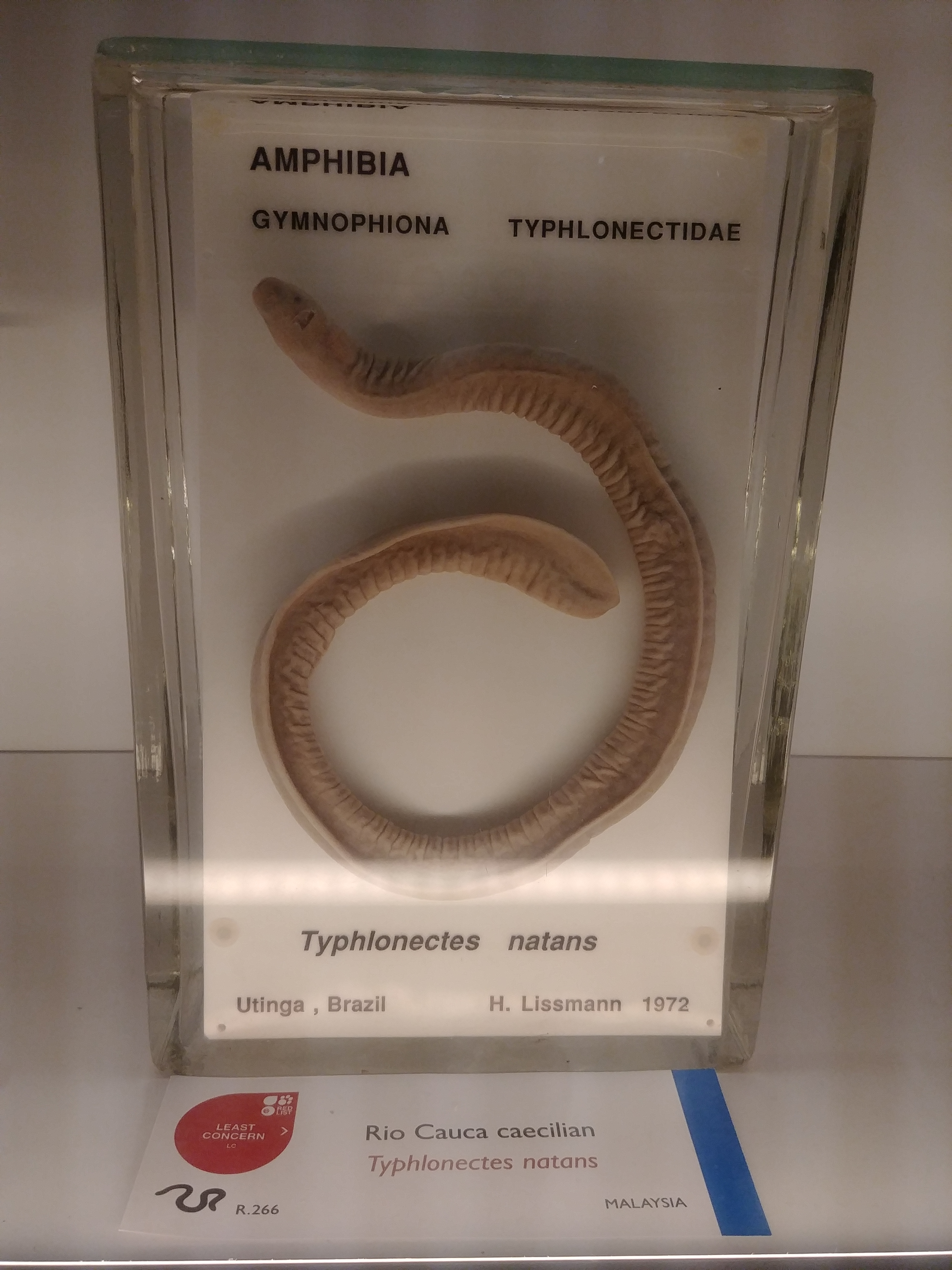
Typhlonectes natans, Rio Cauca caecilian, Zoology Museum, Cambridge

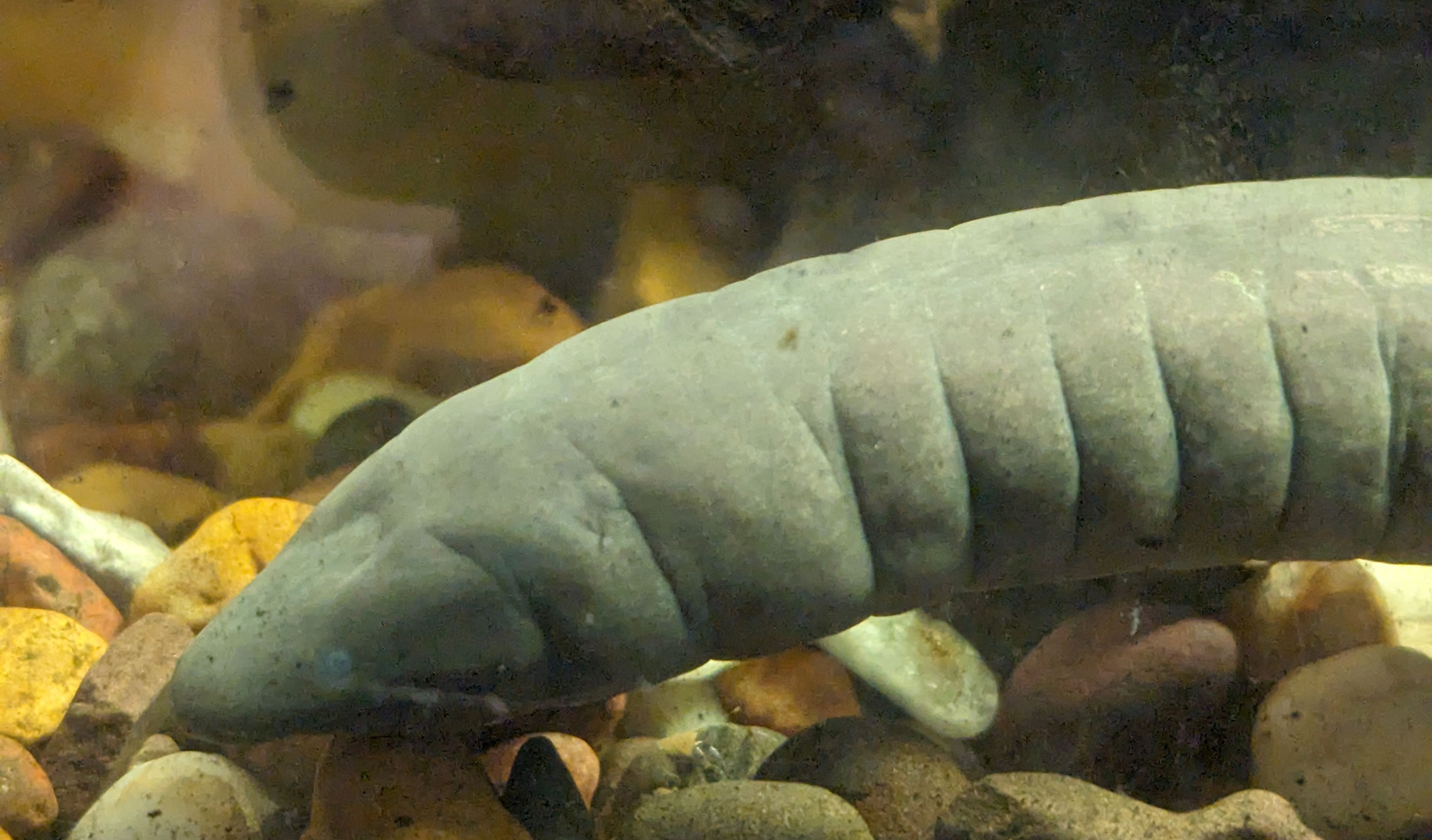
Captive T. natans
