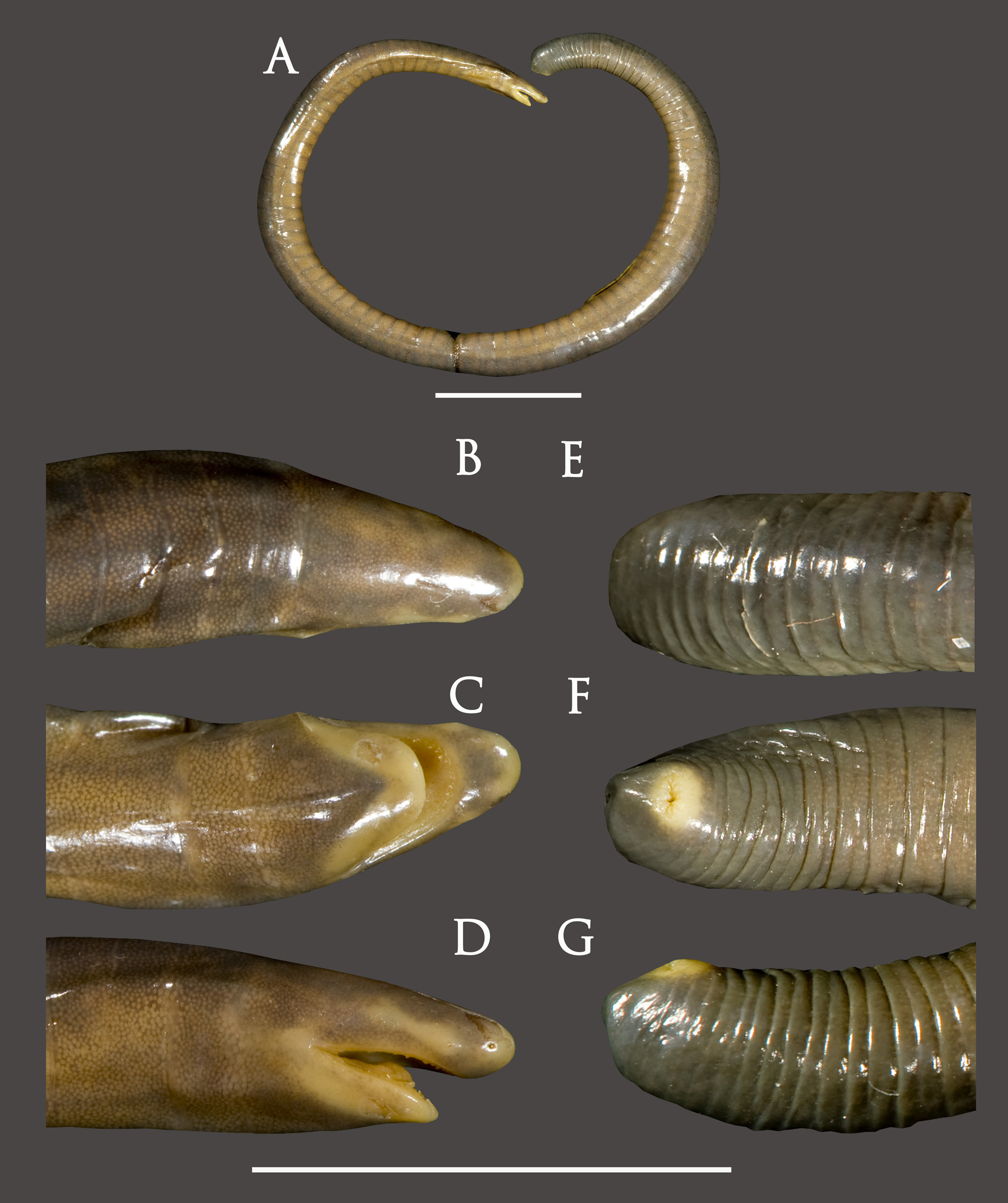

Scientific classification
- Domain: Eukaryota
- Kingdom: Animalia
- Phylum: Chordata
- Class: Amphibia
- Order: Gymnophiona
- Clade: Apoda
- Family: Chikilidae; Kamei et al., 2012
- Genus: Chikila; Kamei et al., 2012

Type species
- Herpele fulleri Alcock, 1904

Species
- 4 (see text)

= Chikila =

Genus of amphibians

Chikila is a genus of amphibian in the order Gymnophiona (caecilians). It is the only genus within the family Chikilidae. All members of the genus are known from northeast India and Bangladesh.

== Species ==
There are four recognized species:

Binomial name and authority	Common name
Chikila alcocki Kamei et al., 2013
Chikila darlong Kamei et al., 2013
Chikila fulleri (Alcock, 1904)	Fuller's caecilian, Fuller's chikila
Chikila gaiduwani Kamei et al., 2013
