= Nectocaecilia =

Conservation status
- Least Concern (IUCN 3.1)

Scientific classification
- Kingdom: Animalia
- Phylum: Chordata
- Class: Amphibia
- Order: Gymnophiona
- Clade: Apoda
- Family: Typhlonectidae
- Genus: Nectocaecilia; Taylor, 1968
- Species: N. petersii

Binomial name
- Nectocaecilia petersii (Boulenger, 1882)
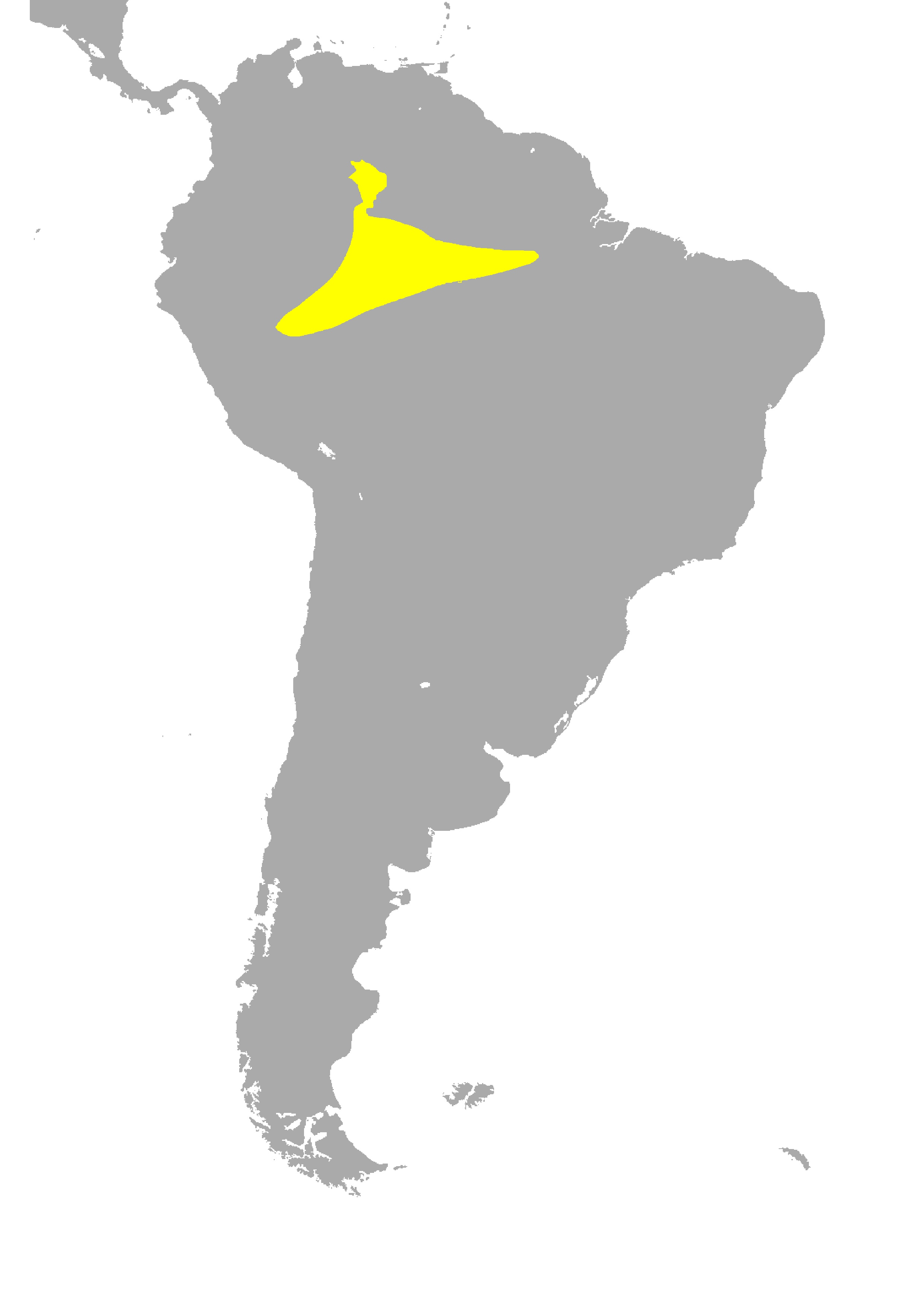

Genus of amphibians

Nectocaecilia petersii is a species of semiaquatic amphibian in the family Typhlonectidae. It belongs to the monotypic genus Nectocaecilia. This species is found in Venezuela and Brazil, and possibly Colombia and Peru. Its natural habitats are subtropical or tropical moist lowland forests and rivers, where it tends to live by the banks of streams. It lives in eel burrows and the roots of floating vegetation. It is threatened by habitat loss. This species has a number of distinct traits that illustrate that it is a burrowing vertebrate, including its very small eyes and long, thin body.
