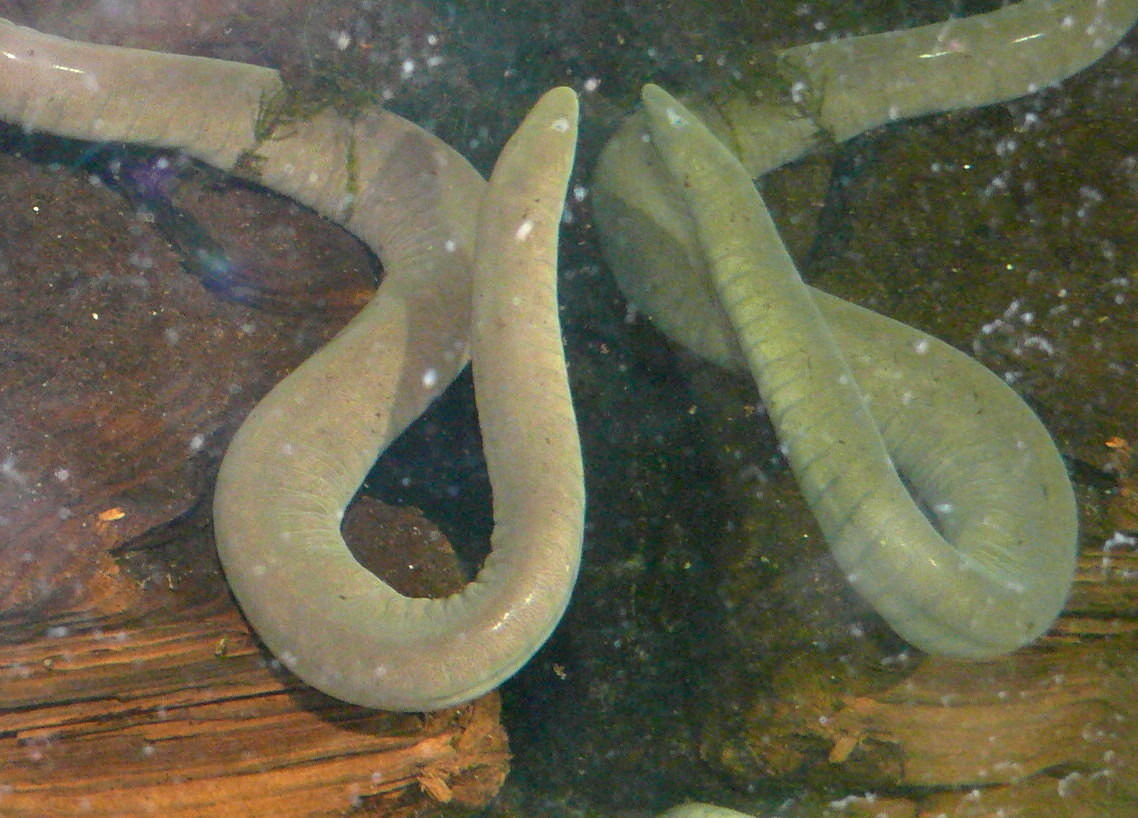
- Typhlonectes compressicauda

Scientific classification
- Domain: Eukaryota
- Kingdom: Animalia
- Phylum: Chordata
- Class: Amphibia
- Order: Gymnophiona
- Clade: Apoda
- Family: Typhlonectidae
- Genus: Typhlonectes; Peters, 1880
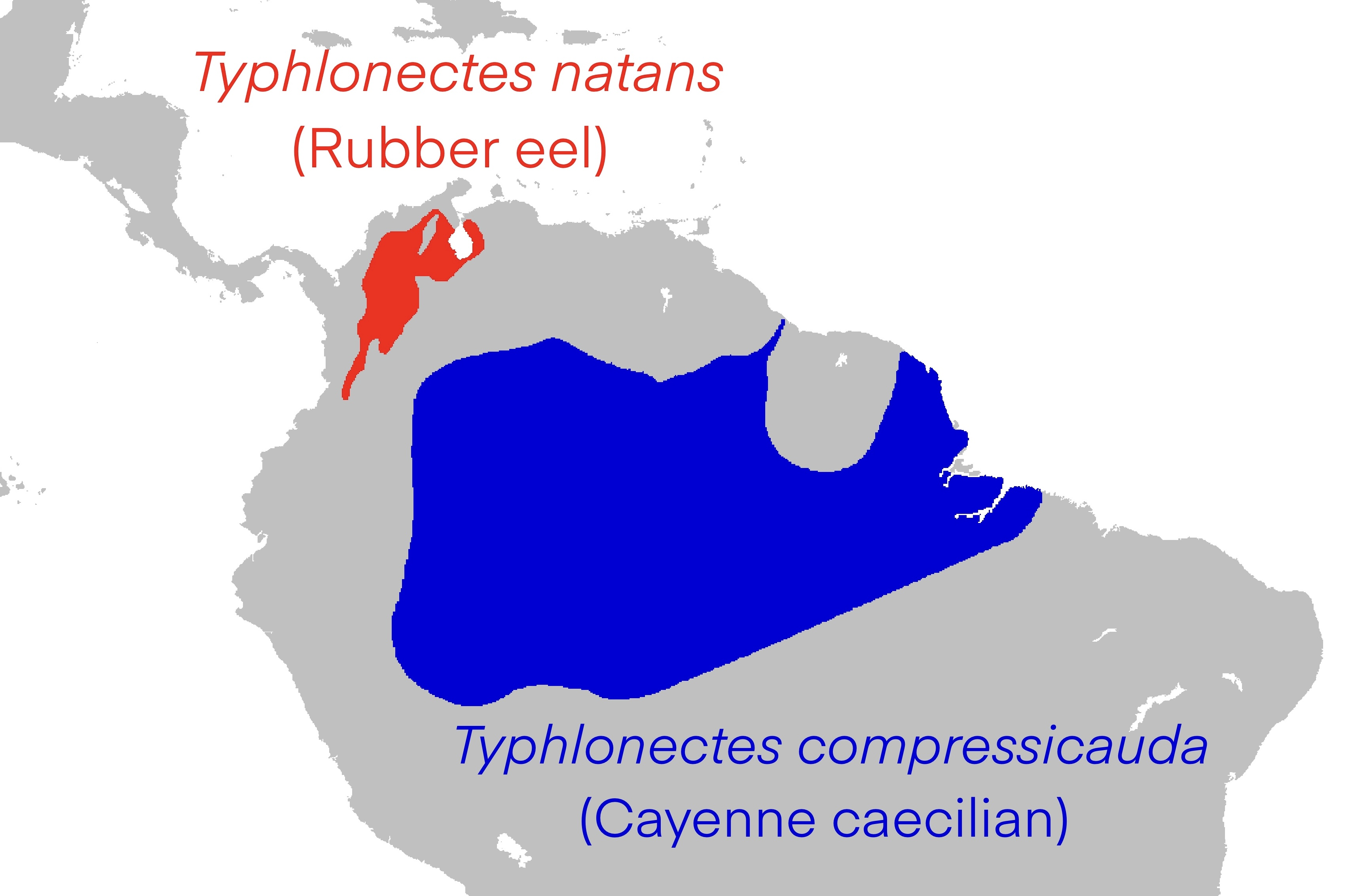

= Typhlonectes =

Genus of amphibians

Typhlonectes (from Greek: τῠφλός tuphlós, 'blind' and Greek: νηκτῆς nēktês, 'swimmer') is a genus of caecilians in the family Typhlonectidae. These fully aquatic amphibians are found in the Amazon Basin and Northern South America, and typically range between 30 and 60 cm (12–24 in) in length.

The genus contains two species:

- Typhlonectes compressicauda (Typhlonectes cunhai)
- Typhlonectes natans
