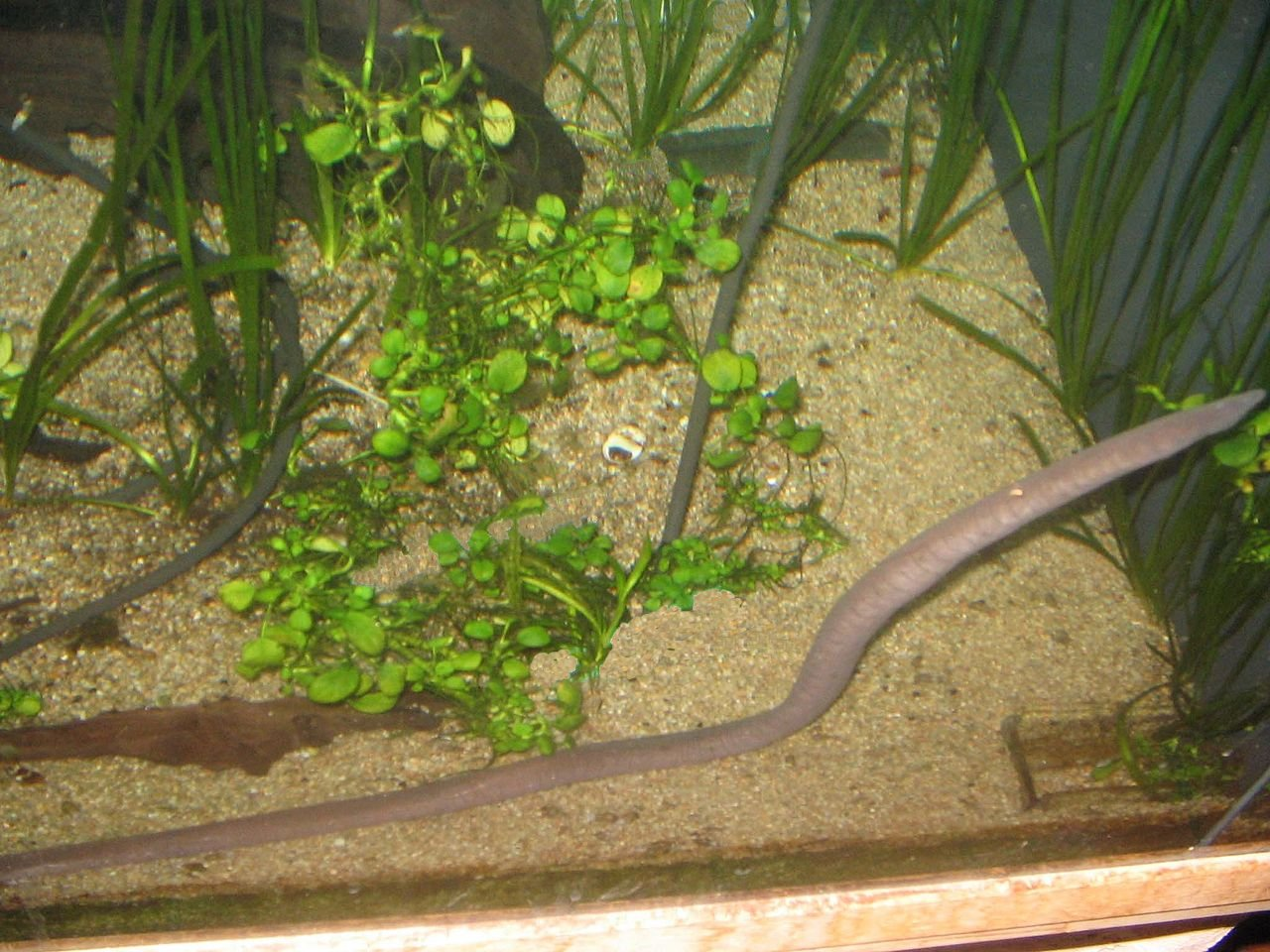
- Typhlonectes natans

Scientific classification
- Kingdom: Animalia
- Phylum: Chordata
- Class: Amphibia
- Order: Gymnophiona
- Clade: Apoda
- Family: Typhlonectidae; Taylor, 1968

Genera
- Atretochoana; Chthonerpeton; Nectocaecilia; Potamotyphlus; Typhlonectes †Ymboirana

= Typhlonectidae =

Aquatic caecilians

Family of amphibians

Typhlonectidae, also known as aquatic caecilians or rubber eels, are a family of caecilians found east of the Andes in South America.

They are viviparous animals, giving birth to young that possess external gills. Of the five extant genera in the family, Atretochoana, Potamotyphlus and Typhlonectes are entirely aquatic, while Chthonerpeton and Nectocaecilia are semi-aquatic. Atretochoana reaches 100 cm (39 in) in length, but other species in the family range from 20 to 60 cm (7.9–23.6 in). A sixth typhlonectid genus, Ymboirana, was recently described and is known exclusively from fossil material.

== Taxonomy ==
- Genus Atretochoana
  - Atretochoana eiselti
- Genus Chthonerpeton
  - Chthonerpeton arii
  - Chthonerpeton braestrupi
  - Chthonerpeton exile
  - Chthonerpeton indistinctum
  - Chthonerpeton noctinectes
  - Chthonerpeton onorei
  - Chthonerpeton perissodus
  - Chthonerpeton viviparum
- Genus Nectocaecilia
  - Nectocaecilia petersii
- Genus Potamotyphlus
  - Potamotyphlus kaupii
- Genus Typhlonectes
  - Typhlonectes compressicauda
  - Typhlonectes natans
- †Genus Ymboirana
  - †Ymboirana acrux
