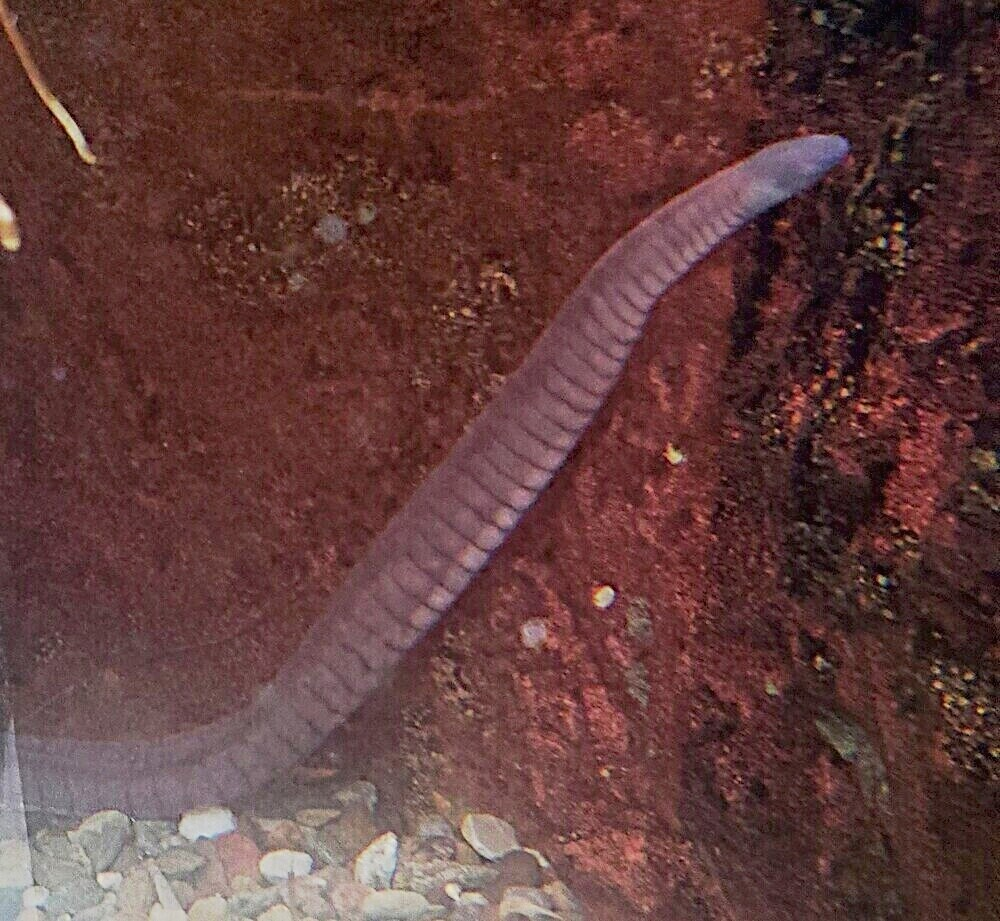

Conservation status
- Least Concern (IUCN 3.1)

Scientific classification
- Kingdom: Animalia
- Phylum: Chordata
- Class: Amphibia
- Order: Gymnophiona
- Clade: Apoda
- Family: Typhlonectidae
- Genus: Potamotyphlus; Taylor, 1968
- Species: P. kaupii

Binomial name
- Potamotyphlus kaupii (Berthold, 1859)
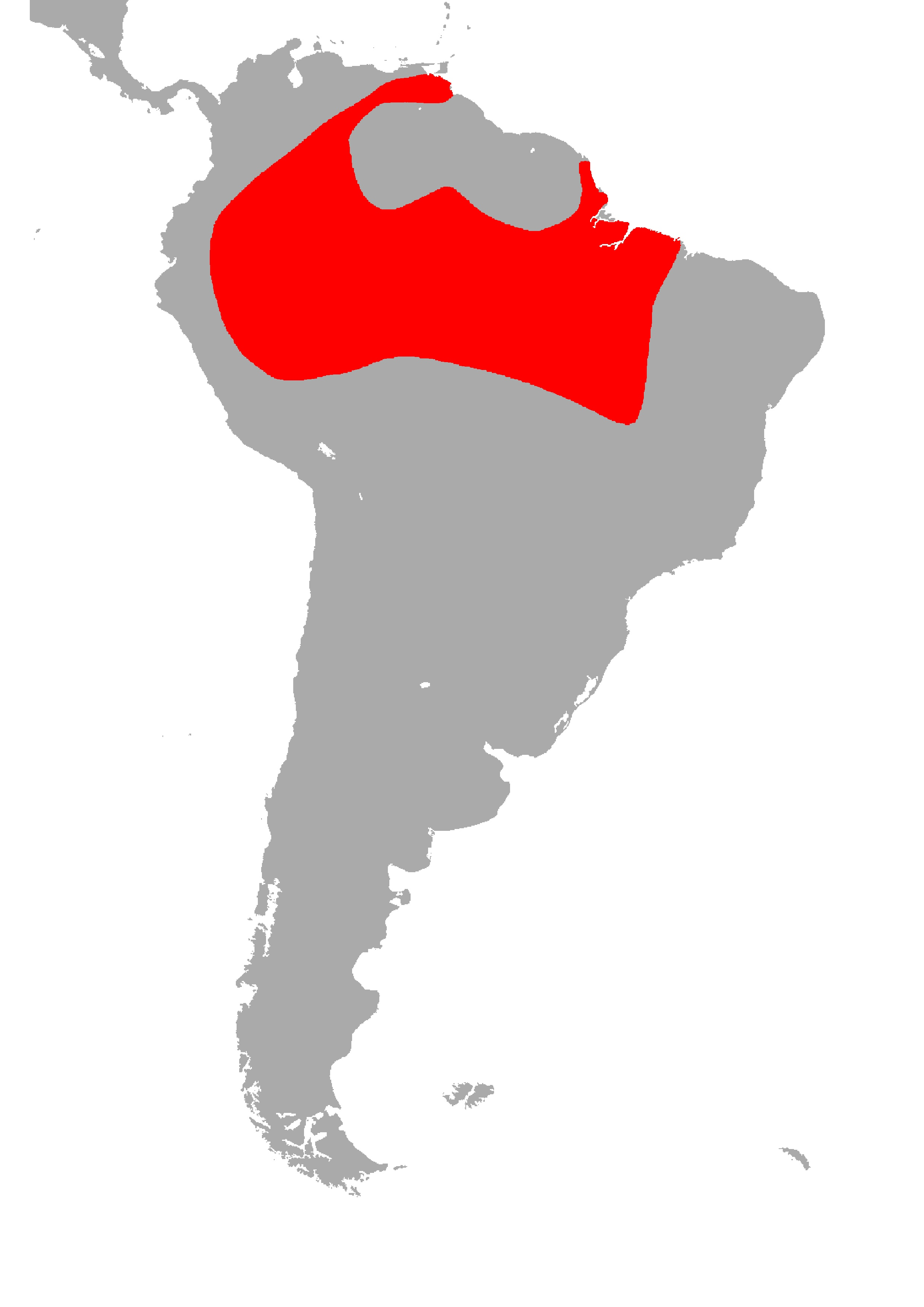

= Potamotyphlus kaupii =

Species of amphibian

Potamotyphlus kaupii (also known as Kaup's caecilian) is a species of amphibian in the family Typhlonectidae. It is monotypic within the genus Potamotyphlus. It is found widely in the Amazon Basin and the Guianas in South America, and is known to occur in Brazil, Colombia, Ecuador, Peru, Venezuela, and possibly Bolivia. It is an entirely aquatic species and typically ranges between 30 and 60 cm (12–24 in) in length.

Their most common causes of death are dermatitis and skin lesions. The chytrid fungus Batrachochytrium dendrobatidis, can also threaten them, as it does to many other amphibian biodiversity all over the world.
