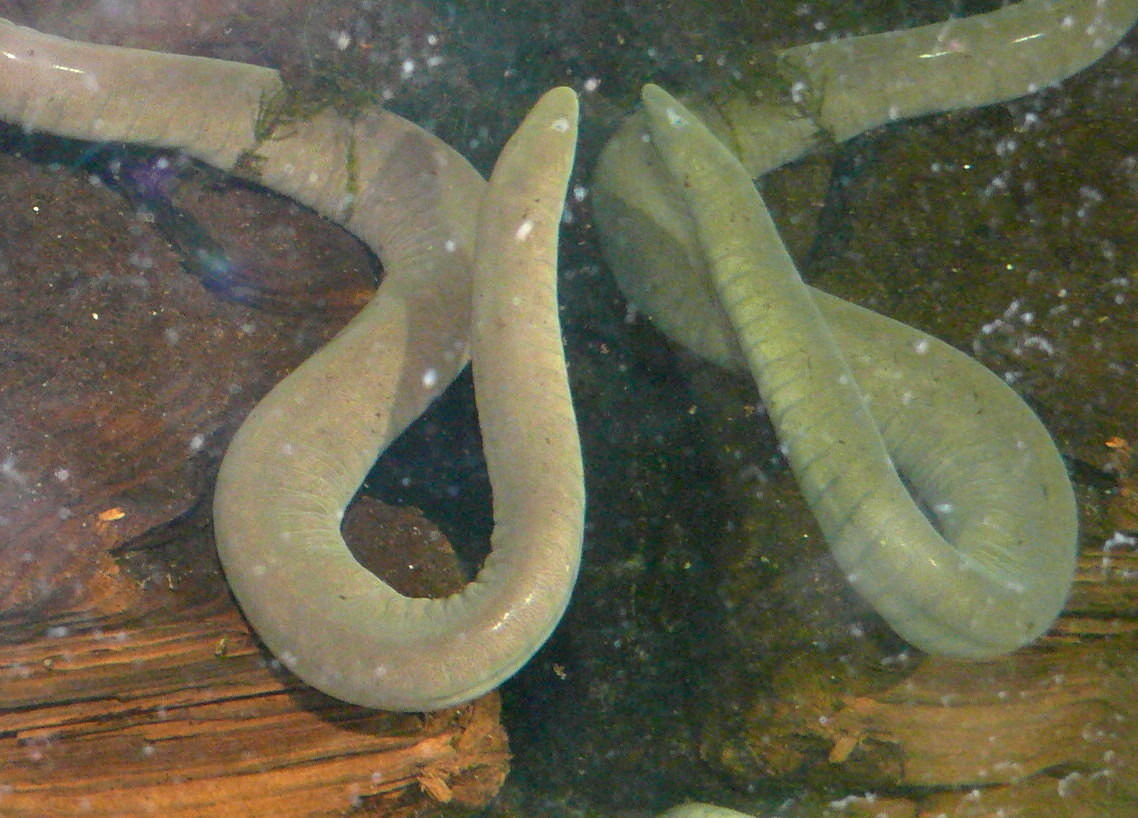

Conservation status
- Least Concern (IUCN 3.1)

Scientific classification
- Kingdom: Animalia
- Phylum: Chordata
- Class: Amphibia
- Order: Gymnophiona
- Clade: Apoda
- Family: Typhlonectidae
- Genus: Typhlonectes
- Species: T. compressicauda

Binomial name
- Typhlonectes compressicauda (Duméril & Bibron, 1841)
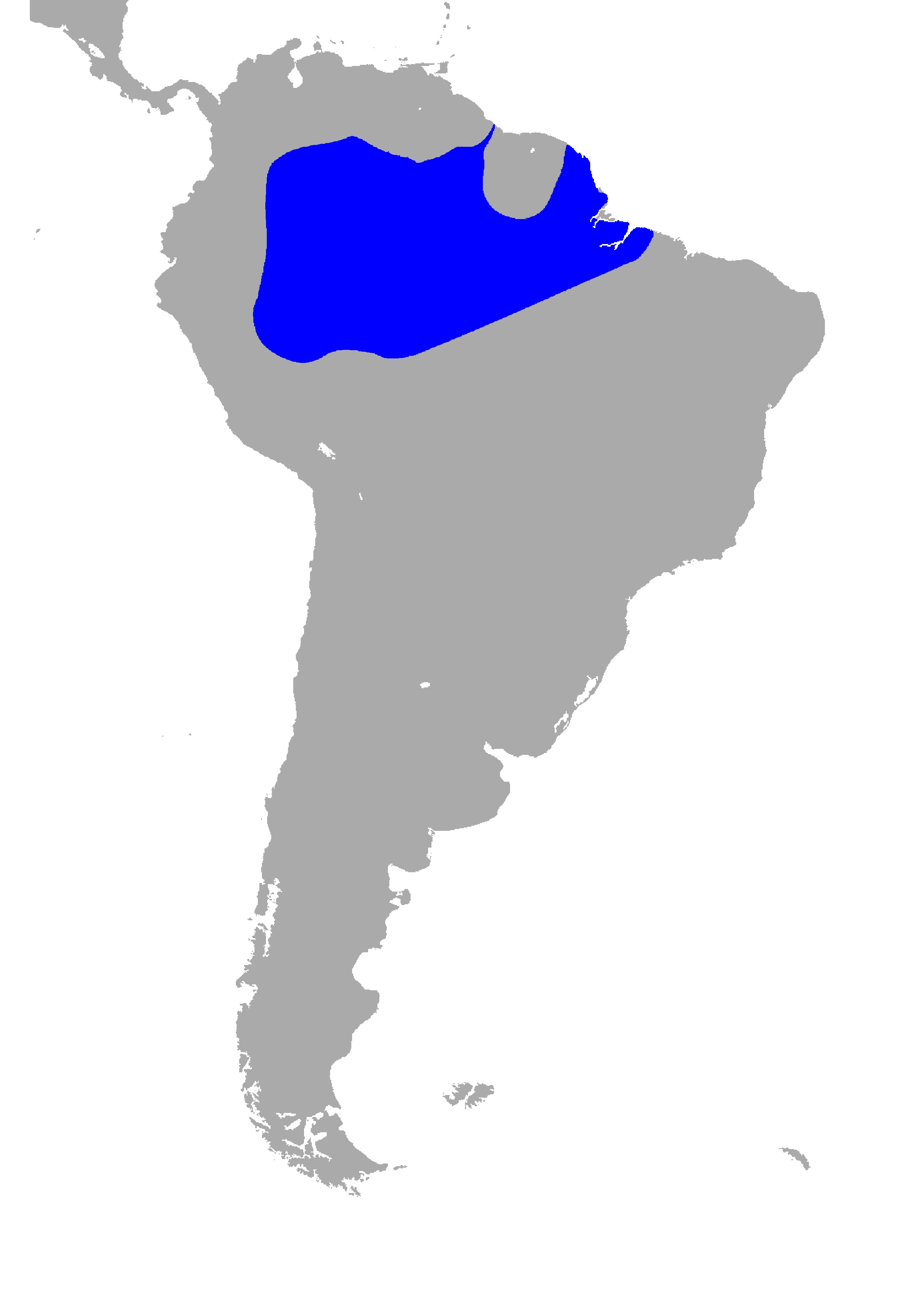

Synonyms
- Typhlonectes cunhai Cascon, Lima-Verde, and Benevides Marques, 1991

= Typhlonectes compressicauda =

Species of amphibian

Typhlonectes compressicauda, the Cayenne caecilian, is a species of amphibian in the family Typhlonectidae that lives in water. It is found in Amazonian Brazil, Peru, and Colombia as well as in Guyana and French Guiana, and likely Suriname, and according to some sources, Venezuela. It is an aquatic caecilian that inhabits permanent rivers and marshes mainly in the lowland forest zone.

== Description ==
The Cayenne caecilian is an elongated, dark grey, black or steely blue amphibian with no limbs. The body is flattened laterally and has a number of transverse folds, giving it a segmented appearance. A long fin runs along its back, and it grows to a length of 30 to 55 cm (12 to 22 in). It has a more highly derived morphology than some more primitive species, showing differences in lung structure, the reproductive organs, and the kidneys.

== Distribution ==
The Cayenne caecilian occurs in South America, including the Amazon basin and river systems in the Guianas. It is found at altitudes of up to 200 m (660 ft) above sea level. Because it is common and has a wide range, it is listed as of "Least Concern" in the IUCN Red List of Threatened Species.

== Biology ==
The Cayenne caecilian lives in shallow streams and rivers. It spends the day in a communal burrow, emerging at night to hunt through the sediment for small invertebrates, such as insect larvae and shrimps. It also eats small fish. It has no functional eyes and probably detects its prey by touch or by the vibrations made when the prey moves. It has slime glands all over its body and secretes copious amounts of noxious mucus if attacked. Nevertheless, it is eaten by birds, snakes, and large fish.

At breeding time, a male and female Cayenne caecilian twine around each other and the male places a spermatophore in the female's cloaca. Fertilisation is internal and the Cayenne caecilian is ovoviviparous. Six to fourteen young hatch inside the female's oviduct with gills. At first, they feed on the yolks of their eggs, but they develop rasping teeth and later consume glandular secretions produced by the lining of the oviduct. Birth takes place after about eight months and the juvenile caecilians shed their temporary teeth and develop their adult dentition.

The Cayenne caecilian is considered to have several characteristics that are more highly derived than other more primitive species. Its karyotype has been compared with that of other caecilians, and its diploid number has been found to be 28, a fact that does not support the hypothesis that, during the period of amphibian evolution, the number of chromosomes became reduced. However, many caecilians have not yet been karyotyped and the exact evolutionary relationships between the species have not yet been determined, so the hypothesis is not necessarily incorrect.

Typhlonectes compressicauda was included in a study of the evolutionary origin of acoustic communication.
