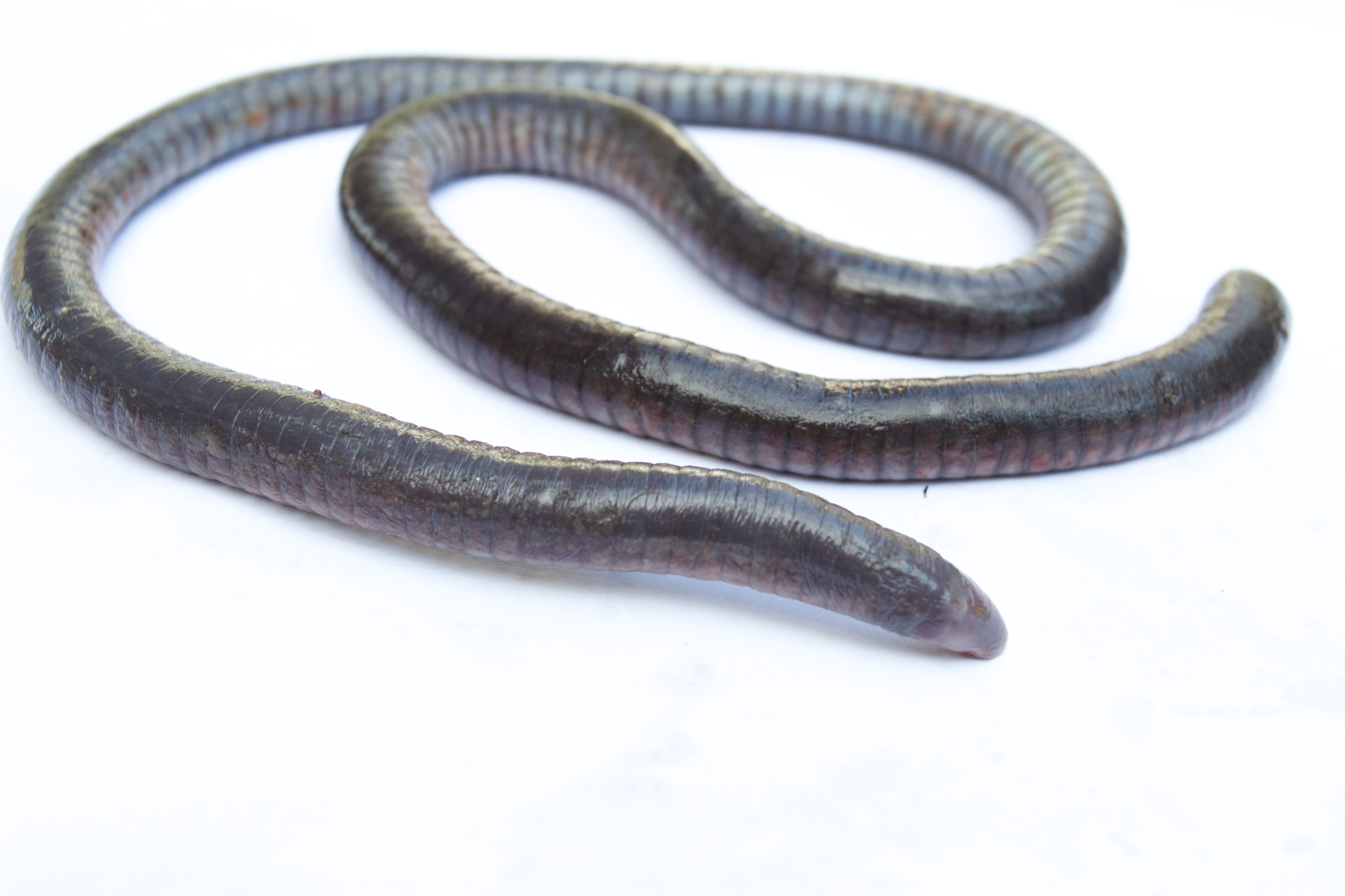
- Oscaecilia ochrocephala (Caeciliidae)

Scientific classification
- Kingdom: Animalia
- Phylum: Chordata
- Class: Amphibia
- Subclass: Lissamphibia
- Order: Gymnophiona; Müller, 1832

Subgroups
- †Eocaecilia; †Funcusvermis; †Rubricacaecilia; †Chinlestegophis?; Clade Apoda Oppel, 1811; Caeciliidae; Chikilidae; Dermophiidae; Herpelidae; Ichthyophiidae; Grandisoniidae; Rhinatrematidae; Scolecomorphidae; Siphonopidae; Typhlonectidae

Synonyms
- Gymnophia Rafinesque, 1814

= Caecilian =

Caecilian Temporal range: Late Triassic (Norian) – Present, 223–0 Ma

Order of amphibians

Caecilians (New Latin for 'blind ones', from caecus, blind) are a group of limbless, worm-shaped or snake-shaped amphibians, with either small eyes or no eyes, comprising the order Gymnophiona. They mostly live hidden in soil or in streambeds, making them some of the least familiar amphibians. Modern caecilians live in the tropics of South and Central America, Africa, and southern Asia. Caecilians feed on small subterranean creatures, such as earthworms. The body is noodle-like and often dark in color, and the skull is bullet-shaped and strongly built. The caecilian head has several unique adaptations, such as fused skull and jaw bones, a two-part system of jaw muscles, and chemosensory tentacles between the eyes and nostrils. The skin is slimy, with ring-like markings or grooves. Some species have scales underneath the skin.

Modern caecilians are a clade, the order Gymnophiona (or Apoda), one of the three living amphibian groups alongside Anura (frogs and toads) and Urodela (salamanders). Gymnophiona is a crown group, encompassing all modern caecilians and all descendants of their last common ancestor. There are more than 220 living species of caecilian classified in 10 families. Gymnophionomorpha is a recently coined name for the corresponding total group which includes Gymnophiona as well as a few extinct stem-group caecilians (extinct amphibians whose closest living relatives are caecilians but are not descended from any caecilian). Some palaeontologists have used the name Gymnophiona for the total group and the old name Apoda for the crown group. However, Apoda has other even older uses, including as the name of a genus of butterfly, making its use potentially confusing and best avoided. The clade's name 'Gymnophiona' comes from Ancient Greek γυμνος (gumnos), meaning "naked", and ὄφις (óphis), meaning "snake", as the caecilians were originally thought to be related to snakes and to lack scales.

The study of caecilian evolution is complicated by their poor fossil record and specialized anatomy. Genetic evidence and some anatomical details (such as pedicellate teeth) support the idea that frogs, salamanders, and caecilians (collectively known as lissamphibians) are each other's closest relatives. Frogs and salamanders show many similarities to dissorophoids, a group of extinct amphibians in the order Temnospondyli. Caecilians are more controversial; many studies extend dissorophoid ancestry to caecilians. Some studies have instead argued that caecilians descend from extinct lepospondyl or stereospondyl amphibians, contradicting evidence for lissamphibian monophyly (common ancestry). Rare fossils of early gymnophionans, such as Eocaecilia and Funcusvermis, have helped to test the various conflicting hypotheses for the relationships between caecilians and other living and extinct amphibians.

== Description ==
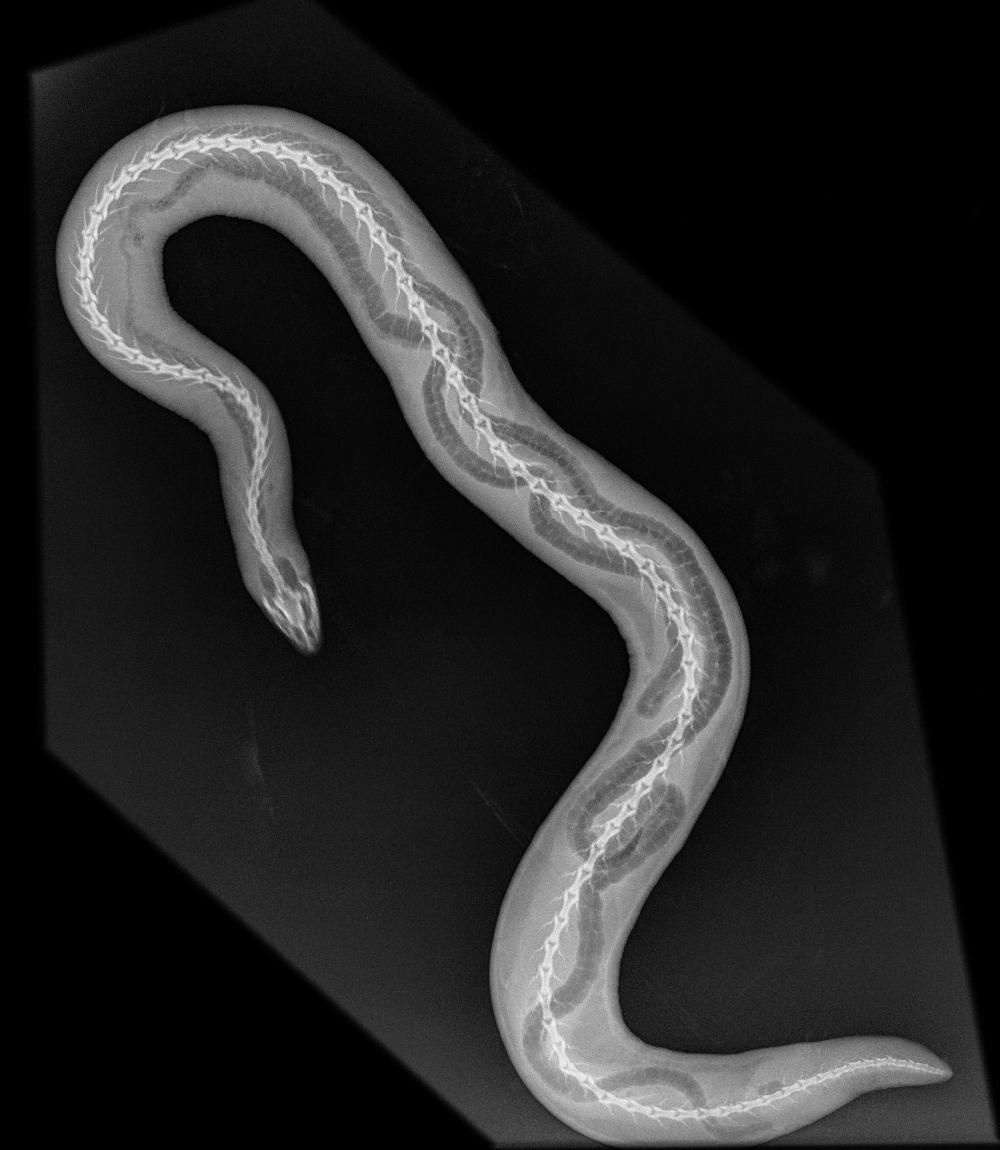
X-ray showing the skeleton of Typhlonectes (Typhlonectidae)

Caecilians' anatomy is highly adapted for a burrowing lifestyle. In a couple of species, belonging to the primitive genus Ichthyophis, vestigial traces of limbs have been found, and in Typhlonectes compressicauda the presence of limb buds has been observed during embryonic development, remnants in an otherwise completely limbless body. This makes the smaller species resemble worms, while the larger species like Caecilia thompsoni, with lengths exceeding 1.5 m (5 ft), resemble snakes. Their tails are short or absent, and their cloacae are near the ends of their bodies.

Except for one lungless species, Atretochoana eiselti, all caecilians have lungs, but also use their skin or mouths for oxygen absorption. Often, the left lung is much smaller than the right one, an adaptation to body shape that is also found in snakes.

Their trunk muscles are adapted to pushing their way through the ground, with the vertebral column and its musculature acting as a piston inside the outer layer of the body wall musculature, which is closely attached to the skin. By contracting the outer layer of muscles it squeezes the coelom and generates a strong hydrostatic force that lengthens the body. This muscle system allows the animal to anchor its hind end in position, and force the head forwards, and then pull the rest of the body up to reach it in waves. In water or very loose mud, caecilians instead swim in an eel-like fashion. Caecilians in the family Typhlonectidae are aquatic, and the largest of their kind. The first fossil discovered belonging to an extant family of caecilians, Ymboirana acrux, is from family Typhlonectidae. The representatives of this family have a fleshy fin running along the rear section of their bodies, which enhances propulsion in water.

=== Skull and senses ===
Caecilians have small or absent eyes, with only a single known class of photoreceptors, and their vision is limited to dark-light perception. Despite their restricted vision, caecilians display circadian rhythms in response to the photoperiod and tend to demonstrate more surface activity at night. Unlike other modern amphibians (frogs and salamanders), the skull is compact and solid, with few large openings between plate-like cranial bones. The snout is pointed and bullet-shaped, used to force their way through soil or mud. In most species, the mouth is recessed under the head, so that the snout overhangs the mouth.

The bones in the skull are reduced in number compared to prehistoric amphibian species. Caecilians have one of two skull types, stegokrotaphic or zygokrotaphic. In stegokrotaphic skulls the squamosal covers the temporal region and the jaw closing muscles while in zygokrotaphic skulls the squamosal only partially covers the temporal region. Many bones of the skull are fused together: the maxilla and palatine bones have fused into a maxillopalatine in all living caecilians, and the nasal and premaxilla bones fuse into a nasopremaxilla in some families. Some families can be differentiated by the presence or absence of certain skull bones, such as the septomaxillae, prefrontals, an/or a postfrontal-like bone surrounding the orbit (eye socket). The braincase is encased in a fully integrated compound bone called the os basale, which takes up most of the rear and lower parts of the skull. In skulls viewed from above, a mesethmoid bone may be visible in some species, wedging into the midline of the skull roof.

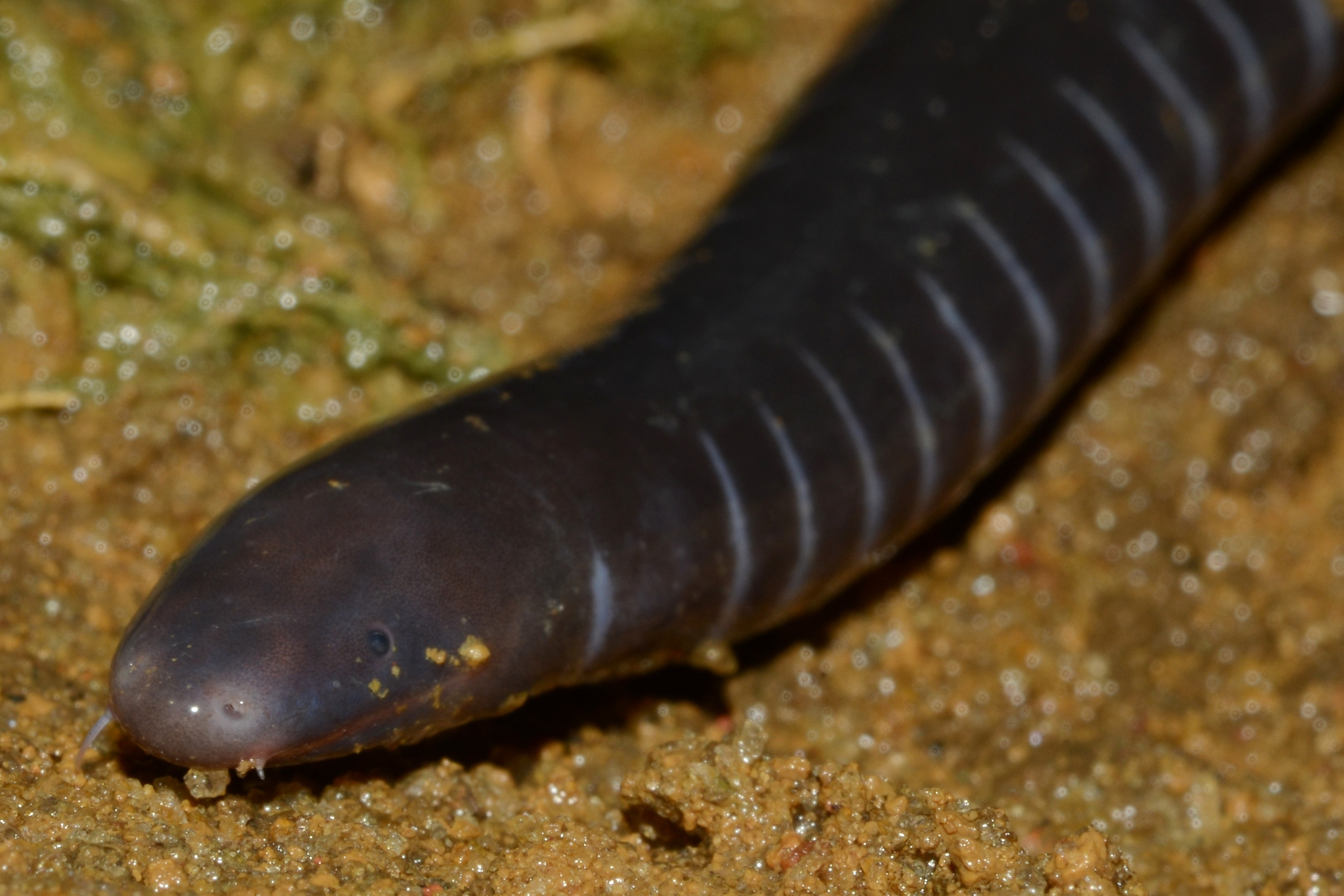
Head of Geotrypetes seraphini (Dermophiidae), showing reduced eyes, nostrils, and small tentacles below the nostrils

All caecilians have a pair of unique sensory structures, known as tentacles, located on either side of the head between the eyes and nostrils. These are probably used for a second olfactory capability, in addition to the normal sense of smell based in the nose.

The ringed caecilian (Siphonops annulatus) has dental glands that may be homologous to the venom glands of some snakes and lizards. The function of these glands is unknown.

The middle ear consists of only the stapes bone and the oval window, which transfer vibrations into the inner ear through a reentrant fluid circuit as seen in some reptiles. Adults of species in the family Scolecomorphidae lack both a stapes and an oval window, making them the only known amphibians missing all the components of a middle ear apparatus.

The lower jaw is specialized in caecilians. Gymnophionans, including extinct species, have only two components of the jaw: the pseudodentary (at the front, bearing teeth) and pseudoangular (at the back, bearing the jaw joint and muscle attachments). These two components are what remains following fusion between a larger set of bones. An additional inset tooth row with up to 20 teeth lies parallel to the main marginal tooth row of the jaw.

All but the most primitive caecilians have two sets of muscles for closing the jaw, compared with the single pair found in other amphibians. One set of muscles, the adductors, insert into the upper edge of the pseudoangular in front of the jaw joint. Adductor muscles are commonplace in vertebrates, and close the jaw by pulling upwards and forwards. A more unique set of muscles, the abductors, insert into the rear edge of the pseudoangular below and behind the jaw joint. They close the jaw by pulling backwards and downwards. Jaw muscles are more highly developed in the most efficient burrowers among the caecilians, and appear to help keep the skull and jaw rigid.

=== Skin ===
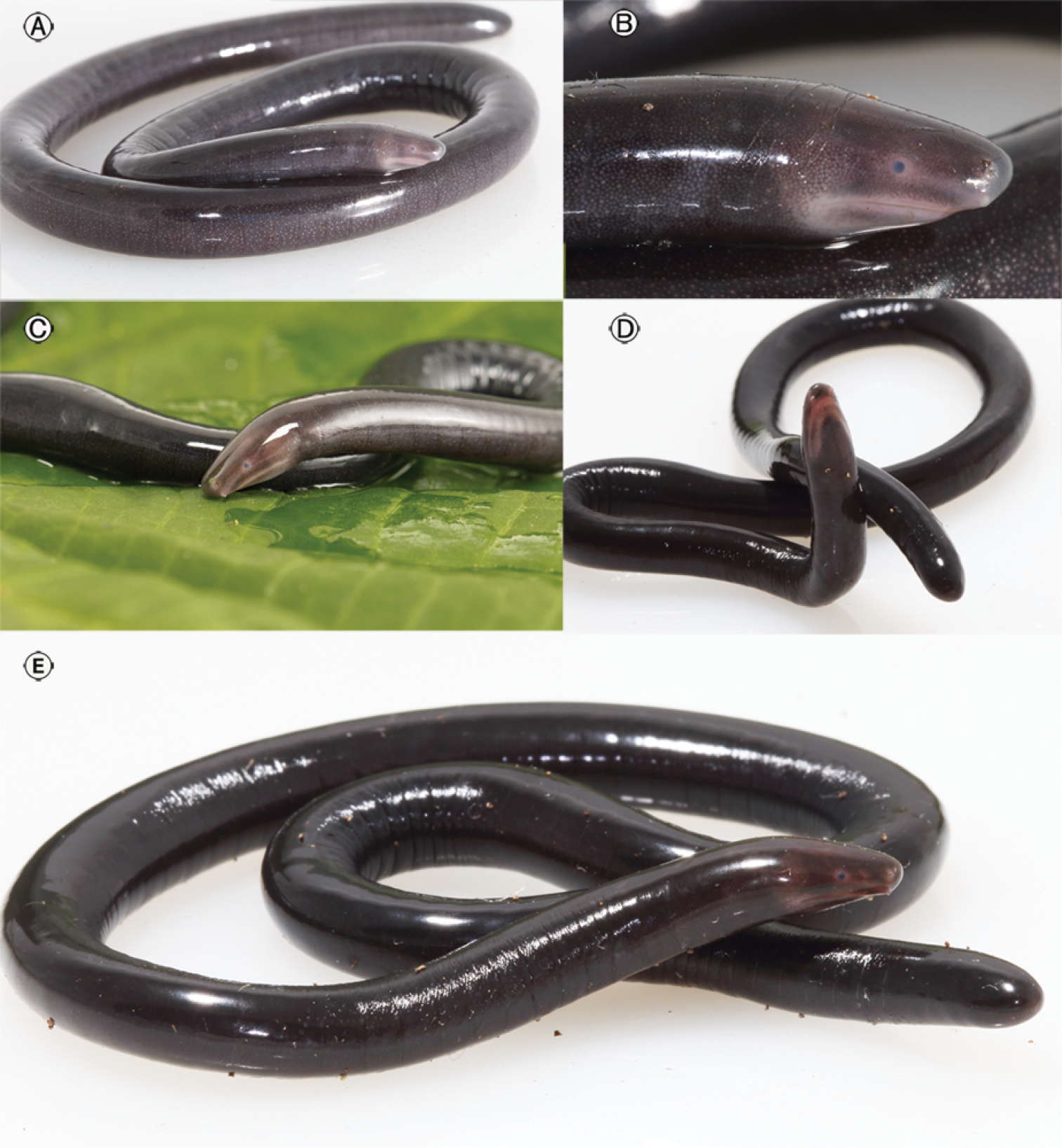
Caecilia pulchraserrana (Caeciliidae) showing the smooth skin typical of caecilians

Their skin is smooth and usually dark, but some species have colourful skins. Inside the skin are calcite scales. Because of these scales, the caecilians were once thought to be related to the fossil Stegocephalia, but they are now believed to be a secondary development, and the two groups are most likely unrelated. Scales are absent in the families Scolecomorphidae and Typhlonectidae, except the species Typhlonectes compressicauda where minute scales have been found in the hinder region of the body. The skin also has numerous ring-shaped folds, or annuli, that partially encircle the body, giving them a segmented appearance. Like some other living amphibians, the skin contains glands that secrete a toxin to deter predators. The skin secretions of Siphonops paulensis have been shown to have hemolytic properties.

=== Milk provisioning ===
Recent research, as documented in the journal Science, has shed light on the behaviour of certain species of caecilians. These studies reveal that some caecilians exhibit a phenomenon wherein they provide their hatchlings with a nutrient-rich substance akin to milk, delivered through a maternal vent. Among the species investigated, the oviparous nonmammalian caecilian amphibian Siphonops annulatus stood out, indicating that the practice of lactation may be more widespread among these creatures than previously thought. In a detailed 2024 study, researchers collected 16 mothers of the species Siphonops annulatus from cacao plantations in Brazil's Atlantic Forest and filmed them with their altricial hatchlings in the lab. The mothers remained with their offspring, which suckled on a white, viscous liquid from their cloaca, experiencing rapid growth in their first week. This milk-like substance, rich in fats and carbohydrates, is produced in the mother's oviduct epithelium's hypertrophied glands, similar to mammal milk. The substance was released seemingly in response to tactile and acoustic stimulation by the babies. The researchers observed the hatchlings emitting high-pitched clicking sounds as they approached their mothers for milk, a behaviour unique among amphibians. This milk-feeding behaviour may contribute to the development of the hatchlings' microbiome and immune system, similar to mammalian young. The presence of milk production in caecilians that lay eggs suggests an evolutionary transition between egg-laying and live birth.

== Distribution ==
Current distribution of caecilians (in green)

Caecilians are native to wet, tropical regions of Southeast Asia, India, Bangladesh, Nepal and Sri Lanka, parts of East and West Africa, the Seychelles Islands in the Indian Ocean, Central America, and in northern and eastern South America. In Africa, caecilians are found from Guinea-Bissau (Geotrypetes) to southern Malawi (Scolecomorphus), with an unconfirmed record from eastern Zimbabwe. They have not been recorded from the extensive areas of tropical forest in central Africa. In South America, they extend through subtropical eastern Brazil well into temperate northern Argentina. They can be seen as far south as Buenos Aires, when they are carried by the flood waters of the Paraná River coming from farther north. Their American range extends north to southern Mexico. The northernmost distribution is of the species Ichthyophis sikkimensis of northern India. Ichthyophis is also found in South China and Northern Vietnam. In Southeast Asia, they are found as far east as Java, Borneo, and the southern Philippines, but they have not crossed Wallace's line and are not present in Australia or nearby islands. There are no known caecilians in Madagascar, but their presence in the Seychelles and India has led to speculation on the presence of undiscovered extinct or extant caecilians there.

In 2021, a live specimen of Typhlonectes natans, a caecilian native to Colombia and Venezuela, was collected from a drainage canal in South Florida. It was the only caecilian ever reported in the wild in the United States, and is considered to be an introduction, perhaps from the wildlife trade. Whether a breeding population has been established in the area is unknown.

== Taxonomy ==
The name caecilian derives from the Latin word caecus, meaning "blind", referring to the small or sometimes nonexistent eyes. The name dates back to the taxonomic name of the first species described by Carl Linnaeus, which he named Caecilia tentaculata.

There has historically been disagreement over the use of the two primary scientific names for caecilians, Apoda and Gymnophiona. Some palaeontologists prefer to use the name Apoda to refer to the "crown group", that is, the group containing all modern caecilians and extinct members of these modern lineages and the name Gymnophiona to refer to the total group, that is, all caecilians and caecilian-like amphibians that are more closely related to modern groups than to frogs or salamanders. However, Apoda been used for groups of fishes and of sea cucumbers and is the name of a genus of moth, and its continued use in caecilian taxonomy is potentially confusing and unhelpful.

A classification of caecilians by Wilkinson et al. (2011) divided the living caecilians into 9 families containing nearly 200 species. In 2012, a tenth caecilian family was newly described, Chikilidae. This classification is based on a thorough definition of monophyly based on morphological and molecular evidence, and it solves the longstanding problems of paraphyly of the Caeciliidae in previous classifications without an exclusive reliance upon synonymy. There are 219 species of caecilian in 33 genera and 10 families.

Family	Image	Taxon author	Genera	Species	Common name	Geographic range
Caeciliidae	Caecilia subnigricans	Rafinesque, 1814	2	47	Common caecilians	Central and South America (Bolivia north to Costa Rica).
Chikilidae		Kamei et al., 2012	1	4	Northeast Indian caecilians	Northeast India and Bangladesh, with possible occurrences in Myanmar.
Dermophiidae	Geotrypetes seraphini	Taylor, 1969	4	15	Neotropical caecilians	Equatorial Africa (West Africa, Tanzania, Kenya), Central and South America (Colombia north to Mexico).
Grandisoniidae (formerly Indotyphlidae)	Grandisonia sechellensis	Lescure, Renous & Gasc, 1986	7	24	Indo-African caecilians	Equatorial Africa (Cameroon, Ethiopia), the Seychelles, western India (Western Ghats).
Herpelidae	Boulengerula taitana	Laurent, 1984	2	10	African caecilians	Equatorial Africa (Nigeria south to the Democratic Republic of the Congo, Kenya south to Malawi, possible occurrences in Angola and Zambia).
Ichthyophiidae	Ichthyophis kodaguensis	Taylor, 1969	2	57	Asian tailed caecilians	South and Southeast Asia (western India north to Nepal, east to the Philippines, southern China and Indonesia).
Rhinatrematidae	Epicrionops sp.	Nussbaum, 1977	3	14	American tailed caecilians	Northern South America (northernmost Brazil west to Venezuela, Colombia, Ecuador, and Peru).
Scolecomorphidae	Scolecomorphus kirkii	Taylor, 1969	2	6	Buried-eyed caecilians	Equatorial Africa (Cameroon, Tanzania, Malawi, Mozambique).
Siphonopidae	Microcaecilia dermatophaga	Bonaparte, 1850	5	28	South American caecilians	South America (Colombia south to northern Argentina, Paraguay, and southernmost Brazil).
Typhlonectidae	Typhlonectes natans	Taylor, 1968	5	14	Aquatic caecilians	South America (Colombia and Venezuela south to northern Argentina and Uruguay).

The most recent phylogeny of caecilians is based on molecular mitogenomic evidence examined by San Mauro et al. (2014), and modified to include some more recently described genera such as Amazops.

- Gymnophiona
  - Eocaeciliidae
    †Eocaecilia micropodia
  - - †Rubricacaecilia monbaroni
    - Apoda
      - Rhinatrematidae
        - Amazops
        - - Rhinatrema
          - Epicrionops
      - Stegokrotaphia
        - Ichthyophiidae
          - Uraeotyphlus
          - Ichthyophis
        - Teresomata
          - Scolecomorphidae
            - Crotaphatrema
            - Scolecomorphus
          - - - Chikilidae
                Chikila
              - Herpelidae
                - Herpele
                - Boulengerula
            - - Caeciliidae
                - ?Atretochoana
                - ?Nectocaecilia
                - ?Potamotyphlus
                - Chthonerpeton
                - - Typhlonectes
                  - - Oscaecilia
                    - Caecilia
              - - Grandisoniidae
                  - ?Idiocranium
                  - ?Indotyphlus
                  - ?Sylvacaecilia
                  - Gegeneophis
                  - - Hypogeophis
                    - - Praslinia
                      - Grandisonia
                - - Dermophiidae
                    - Geotrypetes
                    - - Schistometopum
                      - - Gymnopis
                        - Dermophis
                  - Siphonopidae
                    - ?Brasilotyphlus
                    - ?Microcaecilia
                    - ?Mimosiphonops
                    - Luetkenotyphlus
                    - Siphonops

== Evolution ==
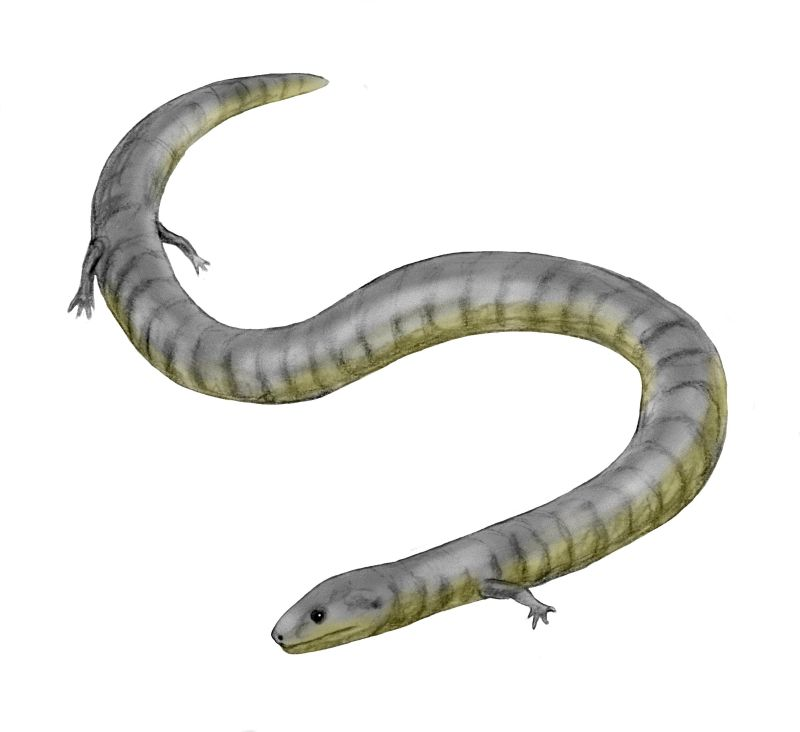
Eocaecilia, an Early Jurassic amphibian commonly considered one of the oldest (stem-group) caecilians

Little is known of the evolutionary history of the caecilians, which have left a very sparse fossil record. The first fossil, a vertebra dated to the Paleocene, was not discovered until 1972. Other vertebrae, which have characteristic features unique to modern species, were later found in Paleocene and Late Cretaceous (Cenomanian) sediments.

Phylogenetic evidence suggests that the ancestors of caecilians and batrachians (including frogs and salamanders) diverged from one another during the Carboniferous. This leaves a gap of more than 70 million years between the presumed origins of caecilians and the earliest definitive fossils of stem-caecilians.

Prior to 2023, the earliest fossil attributed to a stem-caecilian (an amphibian closer to caecilians than to frogs or salamanders but not a member of the extant caecilian lineage) comes from the Jurassic period. This primitive genus, Eocaecilia, had small limbs and well-developed eyes. In their 2008 description of the Early Permian amphibian Gerobatrachus, Anderson and co-authors suggested that caecilians arose from the Lepospondyl group of ancestral tetrapods, and may be more closely related to amniotes than to frogs and salamanders, which arose from Temnospondyl ancestors. Numerous groups of lepospondyls evolved reduced limbs, elongated bodies, burrowing behaviour, and morphological studies on Permian and Carboniferous lepospondyls have placed the early caecilian (Eocaecilia) among these groups. Divergent origins of caecilians and other extant amphibians may help explain the slight discrepancy between fossil dates for the origins of modern Amphibia, which suggest Permian origins, and the earlier dates, in the Carboniferous, predicted by some molecular clock studies of DNA sequences. Most morphological and molecular studies of extant amphibians, however, support monophyly for caecilians, frogs, and salamanders, and the most recent molecular study based on multi-locus data suggest a Late Carboniferous–Early Permian origin of extant amphibians.

Chinlestegophis, a stereospondyl temnospondyl from the Late Triassic Chinle Formation of Colorado, was proposed to be a stem-caecilian in a 2017 paper by Pardo and co-authors. If confirmed, this would bolster the proposed pre-Triassic origin of Lissamphibia suggested by molecular clocks. It would fill a gap in the fossil record of early caecilians and suggest that stereospondyls as a whole qualify as stem-group caecilians. However, affinities between Chinlestegophis and gymnophionans have been disputed along several lines of evidence. A 2020 study questioned the choice of characters supporting the relationship, and a 2019 reanalysis of the original data matrix found that other equally parsimonious positions were supported for the placement of Chinlestegophis and gymnophionans among tetrapods. In 2024, Chinlestegophis was consistently recovered as a sister taxon of Rileymillerus within various positions of Stereospondyli outside Lissamphibia based on phylogenetic analyses and revisions.

A 2023 paper by Kligman and co-authors described Funcusvermis, another amphibian from the Chinle Formation of Arizona. Funcusvermis was strongly supported as a stem group caecilian based on traits of its numerous skull and jaw fragments, the largest sample of caecilian fossils known. The paper discussed the various hypotheses for caecilian origins: the polyphyly hypothesis (caecilians as lepospondyls, and other lissamphibians as temnospondyls), the lepospondyl hypothesis (lissamphibians as lepospondyls), and the newer hypothesis supported by Chinlestegophis, where caecilians and other lissamphibians had separate origins within temnospondyls. Nevertheless, all of these ideas were refuted, and the most strongly supported hypothesis combined lissamphibians into a monophyletic group of dissorophoid temnospondyls closely related to Gerobatrachus.

== Behaviour ==
=== Reproduction ===
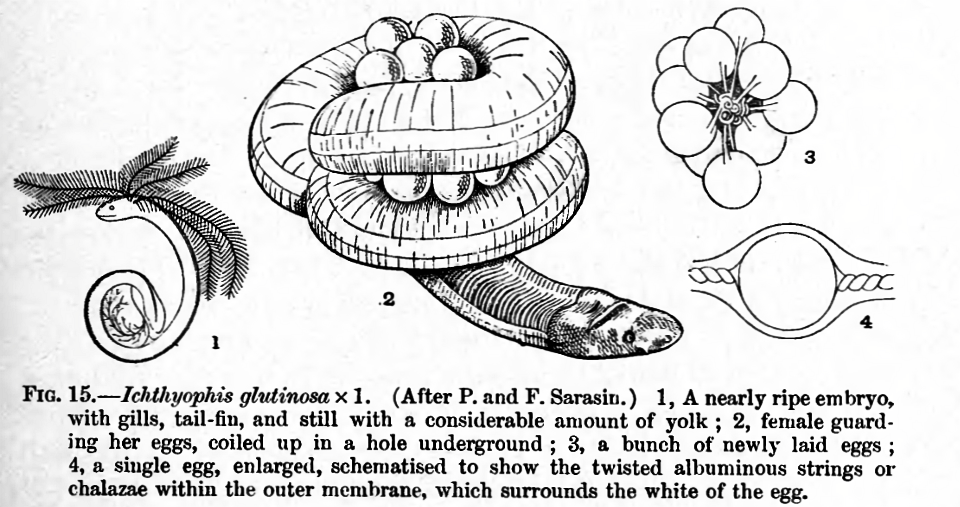
Maternal care in Ichthyophis (Ichthyophiidae)

Caecilians are the only order of amphibians to use internal insemination exclusively (although most salamanders have internal fertilization and the tailed frog in the US uses a tail-like appendage for internal insemination in its fast-flowing water environment). The male caecilians have a long tube-like intromittent organ, the phallodeum, which is inserted into the cloaca of the female for two to three hours. About 25% of the species are oviparous (egg-laying); the eggs are laid in terrestrial nests rather than in water and are guarded by the female. For some species, the young caecilians are already metamorphosed when they hatch; others hatch as larvae. The larvae are not fully aquatic, but spend the daytime in the soil near the water.

About 75% of caecilians are viviparous, meaning they give birth to already-developed offspring. The foetus is fed inside the female with cells lining the oviduct, which they eat with special scraping teeth. Some larvae, such as those of Typhlonectes, are born with enormous external gills which are shed almost immediately.

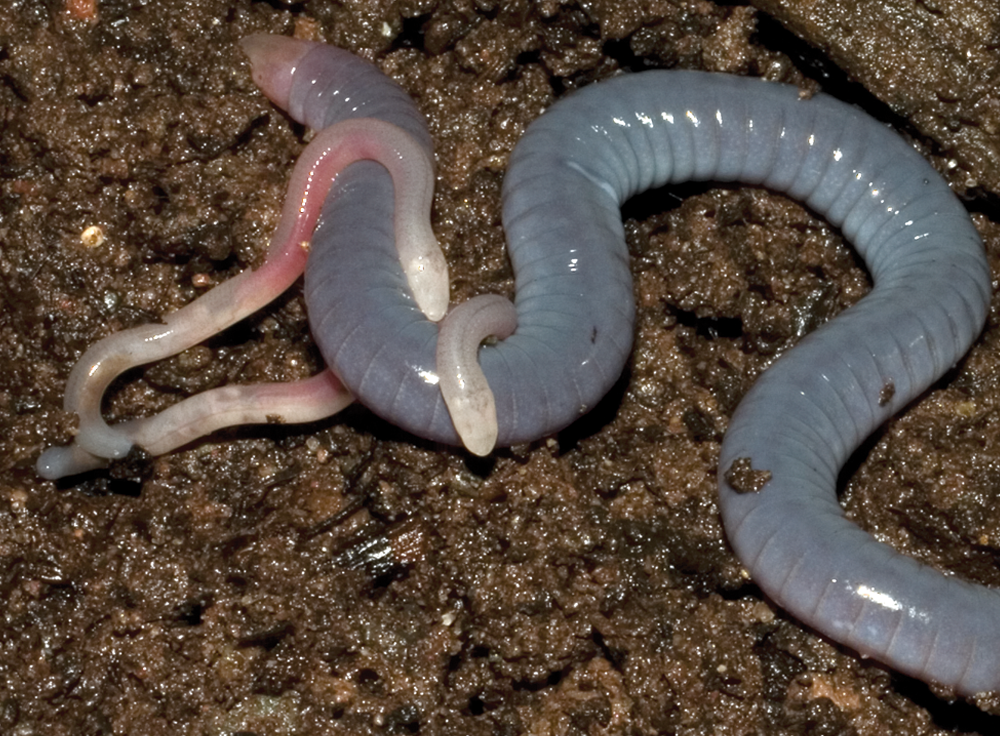
Microcaecilia dermatophaga (Siphonopidae) mother and hatchlings. This species is one of several caecilians in which maternal dermatophagy has been observed.

The egg-laying herpelid species Boulengerula taitana feeds its young by developing an outer layer of skin, high in fat and other nutrients, which the young peel off with modified teeth. This allows them to grow by up to 10 times their own weight in a week. The skin is consumed every three days, the time it takes for a new layer to grow, and the young have only been observed to eat it at night. It was formerly thought that the juveniles subsisted only on a liquid secretion from their mothers. This form of parental care, known as maternal dermatophagy, has also been reported in two species in the family Siphonopidae: Siphonops annulatus and Microcaecilia dermatophaga. Siphonopids and herpelids are not closely related to each other, having diverged in the Cretaceous Period. The presence of maternal dermatophagy in both families suggest that it may be more widespread among caecilians than previously considered.

Herpele squalostoma caecilians vertically transmit the mother's microbiome to their offspring through maternal dermatophagy. In comparison to other amphibians, the extended parenting of caecilians can provide beneficial bacteria and fungi, but this transmission risks the spread of diseases like chytridiomycosis.

=== Diet ===
Caecilians are considered as generalist predators. While caecilians are generally carnivorous, their diet differs between taxa. The stomach contents of wild caecilians include primarily soil ecosystem engineers like earthworms, termites, lizards, moth larvae, and shrimp. Some species of caecilians will opportunistically consume newborn rodents, salmon eggs, and veal in laboratory conditions, as well as vertebrates such as scolecophidian snakes, lizards, small fish, and frogs.

== Cultural significance ==
As caecilians are a reclusive and therefore little-known group, they are featured in only a few human myths and are considered repulsive by many cultures.

In the folklore of certain regions of India, caecilians are feared and reviled, based on the incorrect belief that they are fatally venomous. While some species of caecilians appear to bear venom glands, none pose a danger to humans. Caecilians in the Eastern Himalayas are colloquially known as "back ache snakes", while in the Western Ghats, Ichthyophis tricolor is considered to be more toxic than a king cobra. Despite deep cultural respect for the cobra and other dangerous animals, the caecilian is killed on sight by salt and kerosene. These myths have complicated conservation initiatives for Indian caecilians.

Crotaphatrema lamottei, a rare species native to Mount Oku in Cameroon, is classified as a Kefa-ntie (burrowing creature) by the Oku. Kefa-ntie, a term also encompassing native moles and blind snakes, are considered poisonous, causing painful sores if encountered, contacted, or killed. According to Oku tradition, the ceremony to cleanse the affliction involves a potion composed of ground herbs, palm oil, snail shells, and chicken blood applied to and licked off of the left thumb.

South American caecilians have a variable relationship to local cultures. The minhocão, a legendary worm-like beast in Brazilian folklore, may be inspired by caecilians. Colombian folklore states that the aquatic caecilian, Typhlonectes natans, can be manifested from a lock of hair sealed in a sunken bottle. In southern Mexico and Central America, Dermophis mexicanus is colloquially known as the "tapalcua", a name referencing the belief that it emerges to embed itself in the rear end of any unsuspecting person who chooses to relieve themself over its home. This may be inspired by their tendency to nest in refuse heaps.

== See also ==
- Caecilians of the Western Ghats
