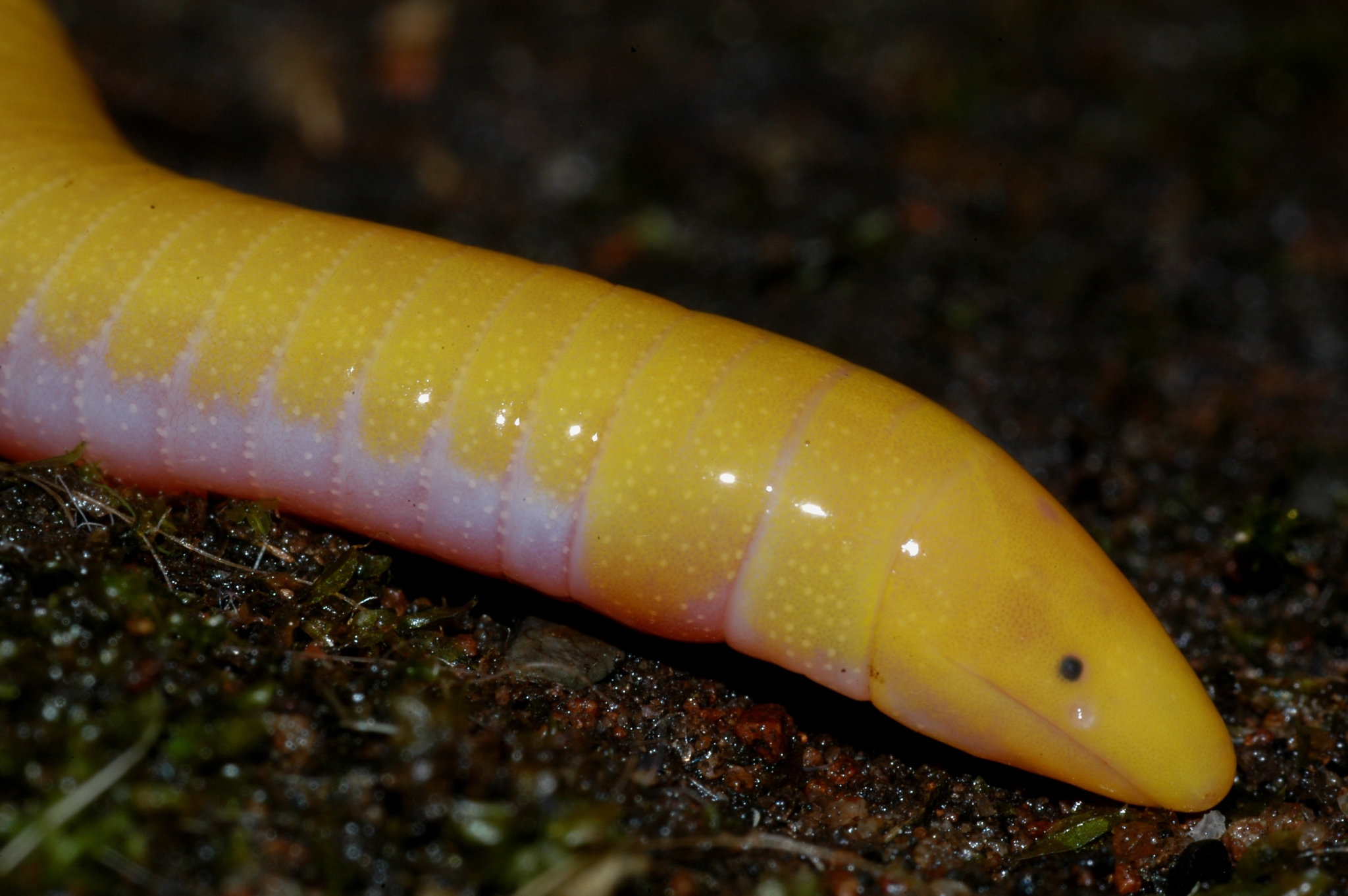

Conservation status
- Least Concern (IUCN 3.1)

Scientific classification
- Kingdom: Animalia
- Phylum: Chordata
- Class: Amphibia
- Order: Gymnophiona
- Clade: Apoda
- Family: Dermophiidae
- Genus: Schistometopum
- Species: S. thomense

Binomial name
- Schistometopum thomense (Bocage, 1873)
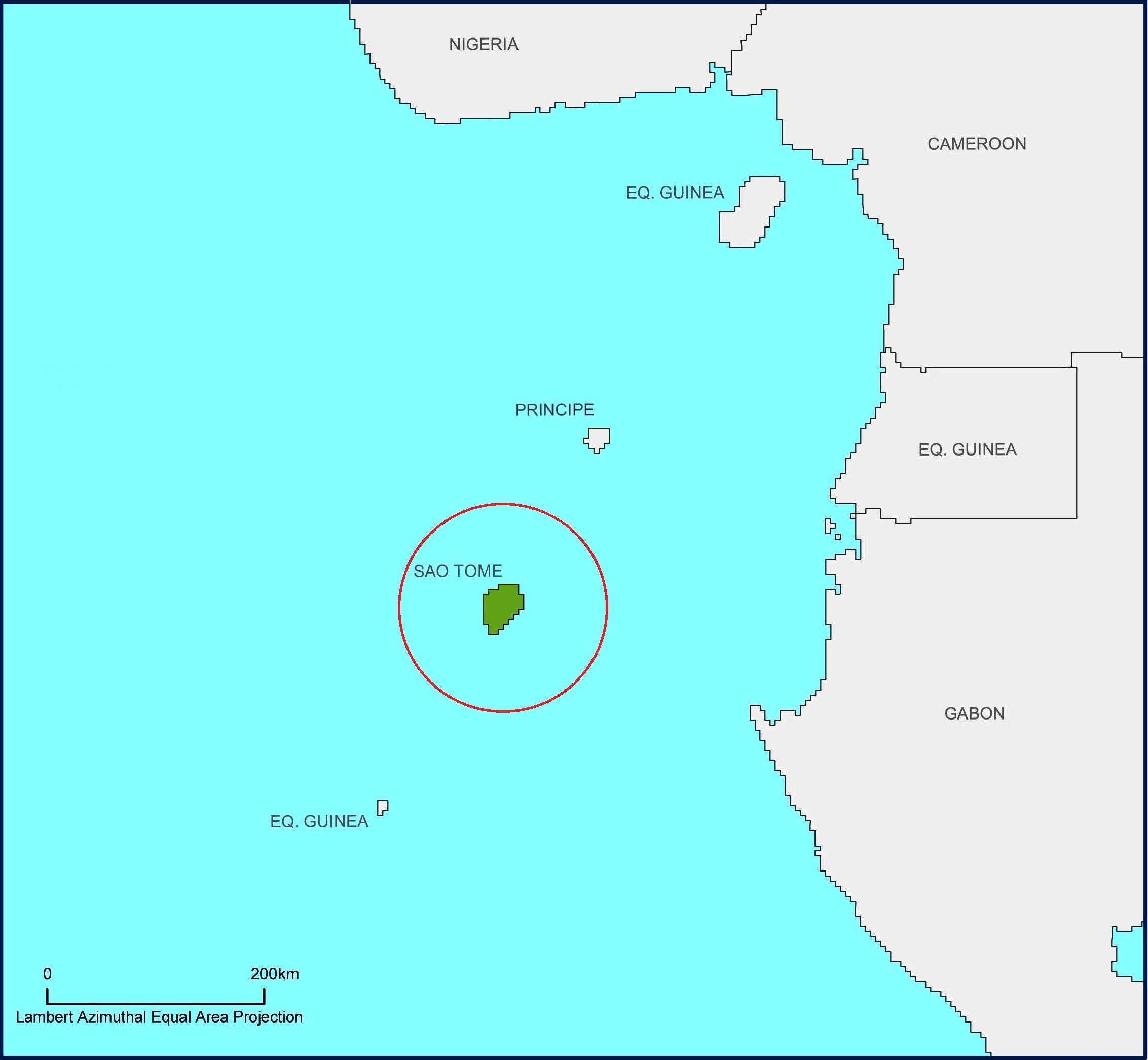
- range

= Schistometopum thomense =

Species of amphibian

Schistometopum thomense is a species of amphibian in the family Dermophiidae, endemic to São Tomé and Ilhéu das Rolas. This species may be referred to as the São Tomé caecilian (with various spellings of the island's name), as the Agua Ize caecilian, or as the island caecilian, or by the local name of cobra bobo. It is found in most soils on São Tomé, from tropical moist lowland forests to coastal coconut plantations. It is absent only from the driest northern areas of the island.

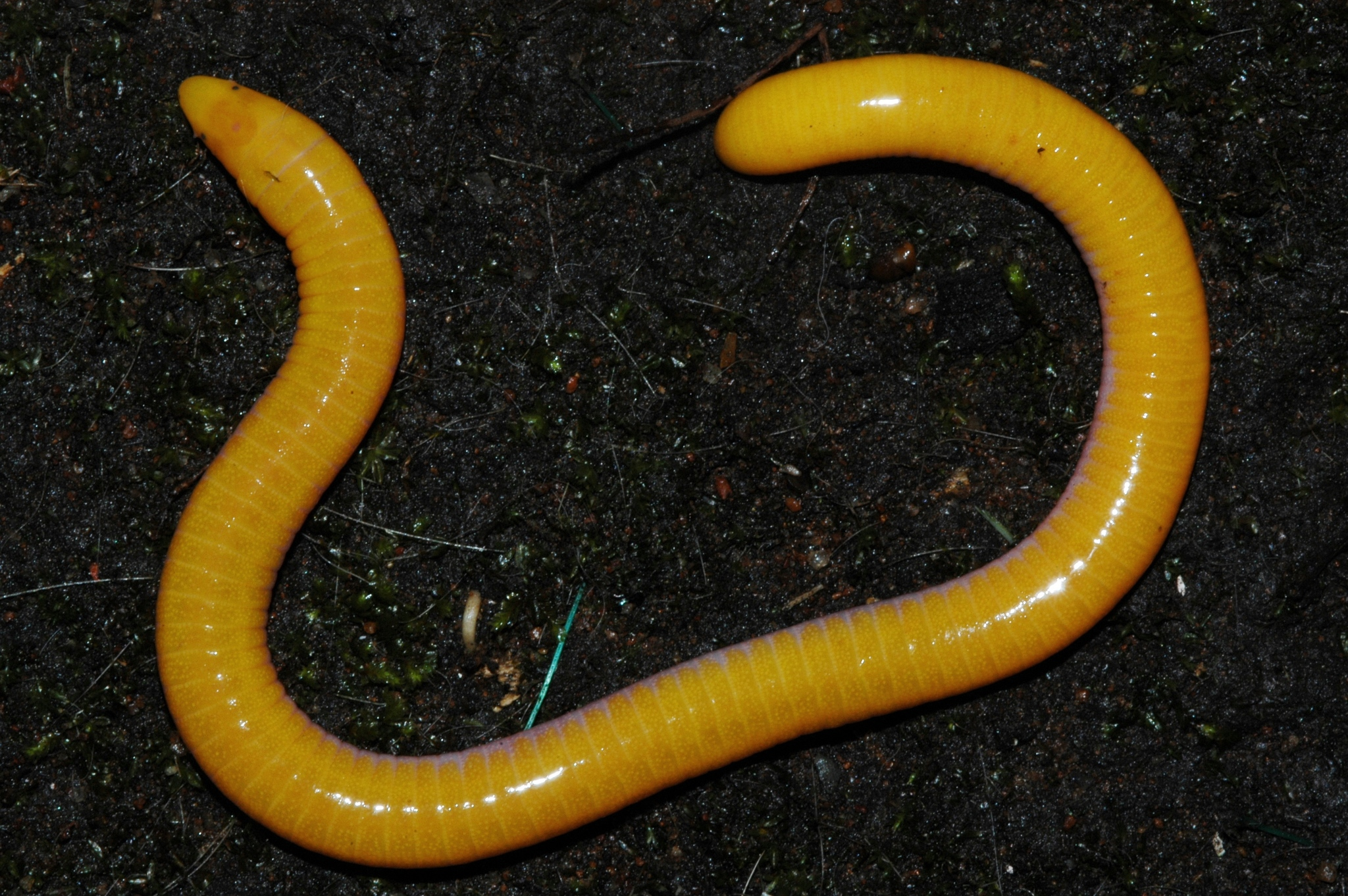
São Tomé caecilian

It is typically around 30 cm (12 in) in length, and is often bright yellow. The size of S. thomense can vary throughout São Tomé, however, and it is the only known caecilian to follow Bergmann's rule, which states that a decreasing temperature due to factors such as increasing altitude will cause an increase in the body size of endothermic vertebrate species. The island of São Tomé is a massive shield volcano, and it therefore has differing altitudes throughout the island, potentially resulting in the size diversity of S. thomense.

== Synonyms ==
The species has been described under the following synonyms:

- Siphonops thomensis — Bocage, 1873
- Siphonops brevirostris — Peters, 1874
- Dermophis brevirostris — Peters 1880
- Dermophis thomensis — Peters, 1880
- Schistometopum thomense — Parker, 1941
- Schistometopum ephele — Taylor, 1965
- Schistometopum brevirostris — Taylor, 1965
- Schistometopum brevirostre — Taylor, 1968

== Phylogenetics ==
Interfamilial and intergeneric relationships of the São Tomé caecilian are well supported by analyses of mitochondrial (mtDNA) sequence data. At the genus level, Schistometopum was recovered as sister to Dermophis, a genus of caecilians found in South America; these two genera are paired in a clade. Within Schistometopum, Wilkinson et al. (2003) found that S. thomense is sister to S. gregorii (an East African species distributed in Kenya and Tanzania) which was also determined to be its lone congener. This congeneric grouping was later supported by sequence analyses of thirteen complete mitochondrial genomes from twelve caecilian species. However, species-level phylogenetic relationships of S. thomense have yet to be fully determined, given the recent discovery of Schistometopum ephele, a cryptic species on São Tomé Island. Available information on species-level relationships (inclusive of S. ephele) is limited to a single line of evidence that the common ancestor of S. thomense and S. ephele diverged from its sister species (S. gregorii) ~1 Ma. Further information is needed to fully understand phylogenetic relationships at the species level.

Zooming out to higher-level phylogenetic relationships, S. thomense was historically placed in the Caeciliidae, a highly unresolved grouping that was paraphyletic with respect to the Typhlonectidae and the Scolecomorphidae. This classification remained until 2011, when a nine-family level taxa (Rhinatrematidae, Ichthyophiidae, Scolecomorphidae, Herpelidae, Caeciliidae, Typhlonectidae, Indotyphlidae, Siphonopidae, and Dermophiidae) for caecilians that resolved the paraphyly of Caeciliidae and placed the genus Schistometopum in the Dermophiidae (Dermophis, Geotrypetes, Gymnopis, and Schistometopum), sister to Siphonopidae, was proposed. Subsequent studies on caecilians used this nine-family classification.
