= Middle American burrowing snake =

Middle American burrowing snake may refer to:

- Adelphicos visoninum, a harmless snake species found in Mexico and Guatemala.
- Adelphicos quadrivirgatum, a harmless snake species found in Belize, Guatemala, Honduras, Nicaragua, and Mexico
- Adelphicos newmanorum, a harmless snake species found in Mexico
