= Dermophis glandulosus =

Conservation status
- Least Concern (IUCN 3.1)

Scientific classification
- Kingdom: Animalia
- Phylum: Chordata
- Class: Amphibia
- Order: Gymnophiona
- Clade: Apoda
- Family: Dermophiidae
- Genus: Dermophis
- Species: D. glandulosus

Binomial name
- Dermophis glandulosus Taylor, 1955

Synonyms
- Dermophis balboai Taylor, 1968

Species of amphibian

Dermophis glandulosus is a species of caecilian in the family Dermophiidae. It is found in northwestern Colombia (Córdoba and Antioquia Departments), Costa Rica, and Panama. It is the southernmost species among Dermophis.

== Description ==
Dermophis glandulosus is a moderately large caecilian, measuring up to 405 mm (15.9 in) in total length. The type specimen was a juvenile measuring 159 mm. Also subsequent specimens were relatively small, leading to a conclusion that it was synonymous with Dermophis parviceps. However, new specimens have shown Dermophis glandulosus to be a separate, much larger species than Dermophis parviceps. It also lacks the contrasting head coloration of the latter and has more secondary annuli. The dorsum is purplish lavender, whereas the ventral surfaces are dull cream with dim lavender clouding.

== Habitat and conservation ==
Dermophis glandulosus occurs in humid montane and lowland forests. In Colombia it occurs at elevations of 40–140 m (130–460 ft) above sea level. It is mainly subterranean, but it is sometimes also found under logs and in leaf litter. It is probably viviparous. Deforestation might be a threat, but the seriousness of this threat is unknown. It is found in La Amistad International Park, Darién National Park (both in Panama), and Las Cruces Biological Station (Costa Rica).
