= Dermophis costaricense =

Conservation status
- Data Deficient (IUCN 3.1)

Scientific classification
- Kingdom: Animalia
- Phylum: Chordata
- Class: Amphibia
- Order: Gymnophiona
- Clade: Apoda
- Family: Dermophiidae
- Genus: Dermophis
- Species: D. costaricense

Binomial name
- Dermophis costaricense Taylor, 1955

Species of amphibian

Dermophis costaricense is a species of caecilian in the family Dermophiidae. It is endemic to Costa Rica and is found on the Atlantic versant of Cordillera de Tilarán, Cordillera Central, and Cordillera de Talamanca. Its taxonomic status is in need of a review.

== Description ==
Dermophis costaricense is a moderate-sized species: total length is 168–387 mm (6.6–15.2 in). It is characterized by high numbers of both primary (107–117) and secondary annuli (74–96). The annuli are not darkly demarcated ventrally, as seen in Dermophis mexicanus, which is also a larger species. D. costaricense appears to be closely related with Dermophis gracilior from the Pacific versant of Costa Rica, and it is possible that these two species turn out to be the same species. However, as presently known, their ranges do not overlap and they can be distinguished based on the total number of annuli (higher in D. costaricense).

== Habitat and conservation ==
Dermophis costaricense occurs in premontane rainforests at elevations of 1,000–1,300 m (3,300–4,300 ft) above sea level. It is a subterranean species that is often found under logs or in surface debris. It is viviparous. Because of its subterranean lifestyle, D. costaricense is a rarely seen species. Deforestation might be a threat but to what extent is unknown. It is present in the Braulio Carrillo and Tapantí National Parks.
