= Geotrypetes angeli =

Conservation status
- Data Deficient (IUCN 3.1)

Scientific classification
- Kingdom: Animalia
- Phylum: Chordata
- Class: Amphibia
- Order: Gymnophiona
- Clade: Apoda
- Family: Dermophiidae
- Genus: Geotrypetes
- Species: G. angeli

Binomial name
- Geotrypetes angeli Parker, 1936

Species of amphibian

Geotrypetes angeli is a species of amphibian in the family Dermophiidae. It is only known from Labé—the type locality which could refer to several places in Guinea—and from Beyla, Guinea and Tingi Hills, Sierra Leone. Common name Angel's caecelian has been coined for this species.

== Etymology ==
Hampton Wildman Parker named this species in honour of Fernand Angel, a French zoologist and herpetologist from the National Museum of Natural History. Angel helped Parker to get access to specimens at the National Museum of Natural History that were included as paratypes in the species description.

== Description ==
The holotype, a mature female, measured 224 mm (8.8 in) in length and 8 mm (0.31 in) in width. The paratypes (3) are also females, the largest of which measured 234 mm (9.2 in). The snout is rounded and prominent, with nostrils close to its tip. There are between 99 and 105 primary and 28 to 33 secondary folds. The holotype was pregnant with eight mature embryos.

== Habitat and conservation ==
Geotrypetes angeli is a little-known species. It is presumably fossorial, and probably lives in forests, or in fruit tree plantations, rural gardens, and secondary forests. Geotrypetes seraphini is known to be viviparous and not to dependent on water for breeding, and this might well apply to this species too.

Threats to and population status of this species are unknown.
