= Geotrypetes pseudoangeli =

Conservation status
- Data Deficient (IUCN 3.1)

Scientific classification
- Kingdom: Animalia
- Phylum: Chordata
- Class: Amphibia
- Order: Gymnophiona
- Clade: Apoda
- Family: Dermophiidae
- Genus: Geotrypetes
- Species: G. pseudoangeli

Binomial name
- Geotrypetes pseudoangeli Taylor, 1968

Species of amphibian

Geotrypetes pseudoangeli is a species of caecilian in the family Dermophiidae. It is only known from Sanokwelle near Ganta in northern Liberia and from Beyla in southeastern Guinea. Common name false Angel's caecilian has been suggested for this species.

== Habitat and conservation ==
Geotrypetes pseudoangeli is a little-known species. It is presumably fossorial, and probably lives in forests, or in fruit tree plantations, rural gardens, and secondary forests. Geotrypetes seraphini is known to be viviparous and not to dependent on water for breeding, and this might well apply to this species too.

Threats to and population status of this species are unknown.
