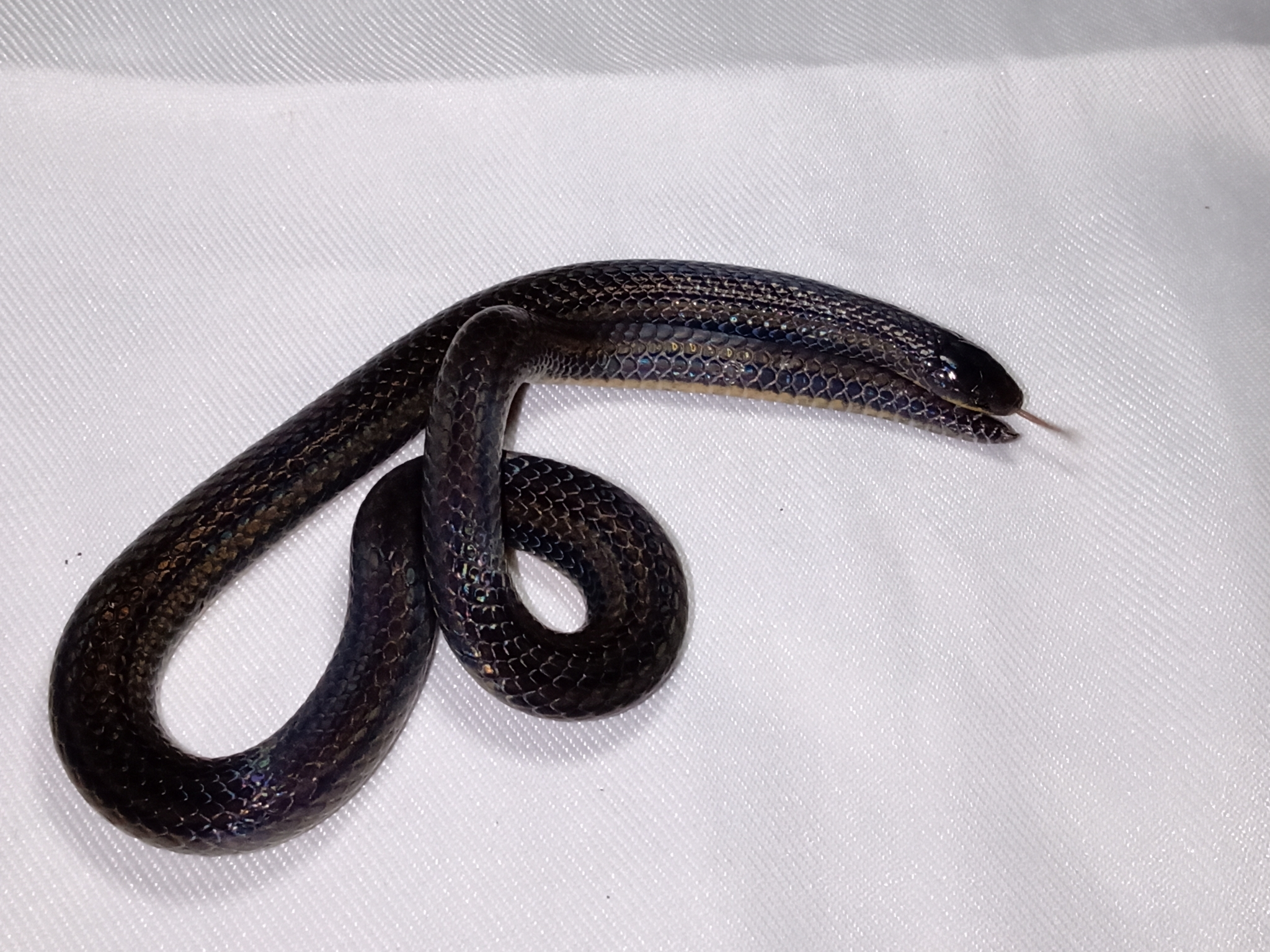

Conservation status
- Endangered (IUCN 3.1)

Scientific classification
- Kingdom: Animalia
- Phylum: Chordata
- Class: Reptilia
- Order: Squamata
- Suborder: Serpentes
- Family: Colubridae
- Genus: Adelphicos
- Species: A. daryi

Binomial name
- Adelphicos daryi Campbell & Ford, 1982

= Dary's burrowing snake =

Species of snake

Dary's burrowing snake (Adelphicos daryi) is a species of snake in the family Colubridae. The species is native to Guatemala.

== Etymology ==
The specific name, daryi, is in honor of Guatemalan biologist Mario Dary Rivera (1928-1981).

== Taxonomy ==
A. daryi is a member of the veraepacis species group.

== Geographic range and habitat ==
A. daryi is endemic to the Guatemalan central highlands in pine-oak forests, at elevations from 1,300–2,135 m (4,265–7,005 ft).

== Description ==
A. daryi is large for its species group. Females may attain a total length (including tail) of 57 cm (22 in), and males may exceed 40 cm (16 in) in total length.

== Behavior ==
Dary's burrowing snake is terrestrial, fossorial, and mainly nocturnal.

== Conservation status ==
A. daryi is threatened by urban sprawl.
