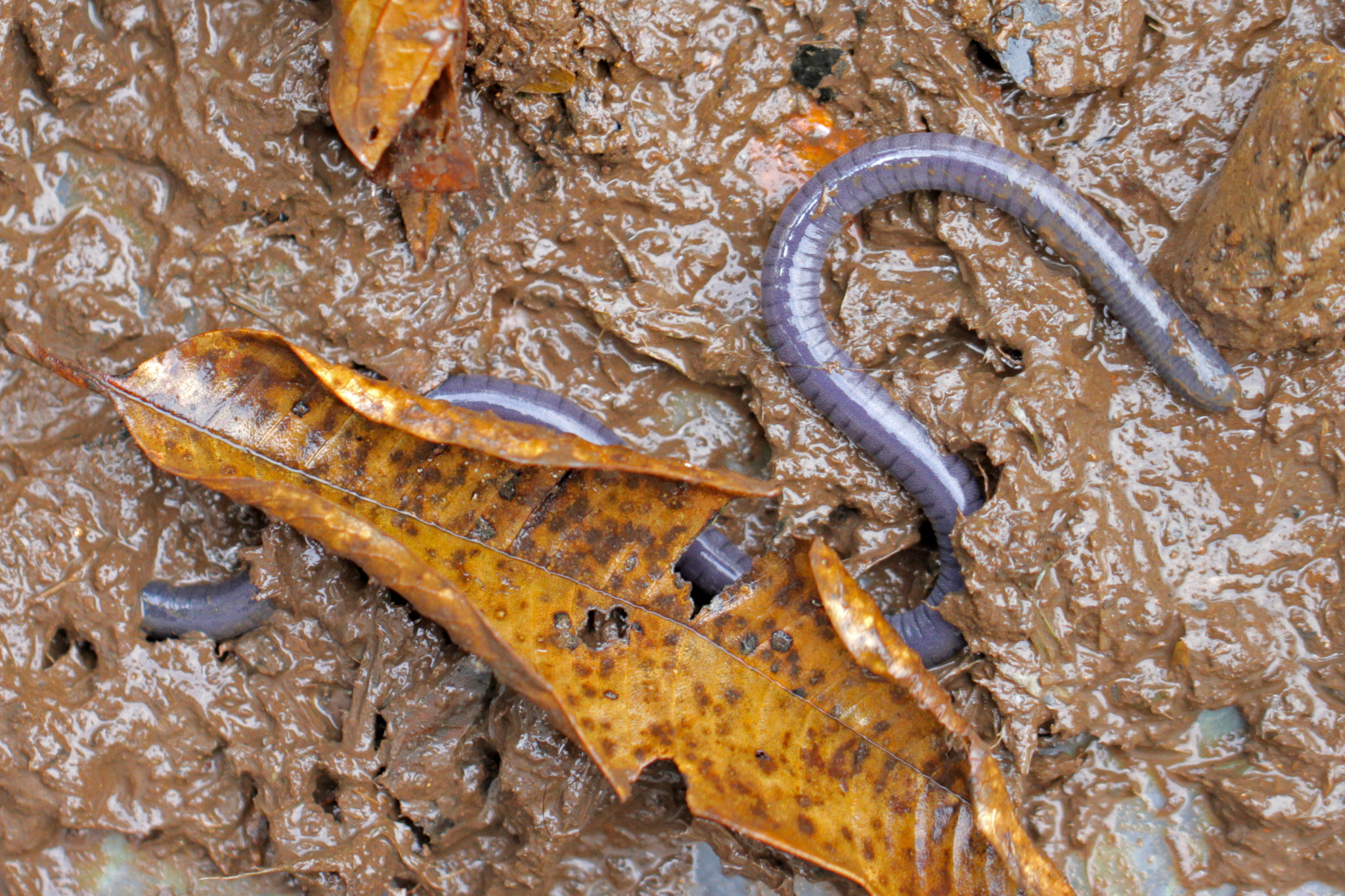
- D. parviceps in Heredia Province, Costa Rica

Conservation status
- Least Concern (IUCN 3.1)

Scientific classification
- Kingdom: Animalia
- Phylum: Chordata
- Class: Amphibia
- Order: Gymnophiona
- Clade: Apoda
- Family: Dermophiidae
- Genus: Dermophis
- Species: D. parviceps

Binomial name
- Dermophis parviceps (Dunn, 1924)

Synonyms
- Siphonops parviceps Dunn, 1924; Gymnopis parviceps (Dunn, 1924)

= Dermophis parviceps =

Species of amphibian

Dermophis parviceps is a species of caecilian in the family Dermophiidae. It is found in Costa Rica and Panama, and possibly in Colombia, depending on the source. Common names slender caecilian and La Loma caecilian have been coined for it.

== Description ==
Specimens from Costa Rica measure 112–217 mm (4.4–8.5 in) in total length and have 85–102 primary and 11–26 secondary annuli; the annular grooves lack dark pigment seen in Dermophis mexicanus and Dermophis oaxacae. The body is slender. The eyes can be seen through the skin. The head is pinkish, contrasting with the purplish-gray body.

== Habitat and conservation ==
Dermophis parviceps occurs in humid montane and lowland forest at elevations of 40–1,200 m (130–3,940 ft) above sea level. It is a subterranean species that can be found as deep as 60 cm (2 ft) below the soil surface, but also under logs or in leaf litter. It is probably viviparous and not dependent on water for its reproduction.

D. parviceps can be locally common. It is unknown to which degree deforestation is a threat to it. It is present in many protected areas in Panama and Costa Rica.
