= ZSWIM9 =

Protein-coding gene found in humans

Identifiers
- Aliases: ZSWIM9, C19orf68, chromosome 19 open reading frame 68, zinc finger SWIM-type containing 9
- External IDs: MGI: 2447816; GeneCards: ZSWIM9

Gene location (Human)
Chr.	Chromosome 19 (human)
Band	19q13.33	Start	48,170,680 bp
Band	19q13.33	End	48,197,620 bp

Gene location (Mouse)
Chr.	Chromosome 7 (mouse)
Band	7|7 A1	Start	12,992,894 bp
Band	7|7 A1	End	13,012,647 bp
RNA expression pattern
Bgee	Human / Mouse (ortholog); Top expressed in: tendon of biceps brachii; skin of arm; cerebellar vermis; myocardium of left ventricle; vena cava; internal globus pallidus; Skeletal muscle tissue of rectus abdominis; nasal epithelium; cardiac muscle tissue of right atrium; parotid gland / Top expressed in: interventricular septum; muscle of thigh; neural layer of retina; internal carotid artery; external carotid artery; genital tubercle; tail of embryo; skeletal muscle tissue; visual cortex; dentate gyrus of hippocampal formation granule cell; More reference expression data
BioGPS	n/a
Gene ontology
Molecular function	protein binding
Cellular component	nucleus
Biological process	multicellular organism development; ubiquitin-dependent protein catabolic process
Sources:Amigo / QuickGO
Orthologs
Databases	NCBI: entry; OMA: entry
Species	Human	Mouse
Entrez	374920	321008
Ensembl	ENSG00000185453	ENSMUSG00000070814
UniProt	Q86XI8	Q6DI92
RefSeq (mRNA)	NM_199341	NM_177312
RefSeq (protein)	NP_955373	NP_796286
Location (UCSC)	Chr 19: 48.17 – 48.2 Mb	Chr 7: 12.99 – 13.01 Mb
PubMed search
- Wikidata
View/Edit Human	View/Edit Mouse

Zinc finger SWIM-type containing 9 is a protein encoded in humans by the ZSWIM9 gene. It is a member of zinc finger SWIM-type family. This gene is expressed in embryonic development and predicted to act in cell differentiation.

== Gene ==
The ZSWIM9 gene is located on the plus strand at 19q13.33 from 48,170,680 to 48,197,620 spanning 26,941 base pairs. Also known as C19orf68, this gene has orthologs in placental mammals, marsupials, reptiles (turtles), birds (flightless birds), and amphibians. ZSWIM9 has 4 exons, with variation between isoforms.

== mRNA and transcriptional variants ==
=== Transcripts ===
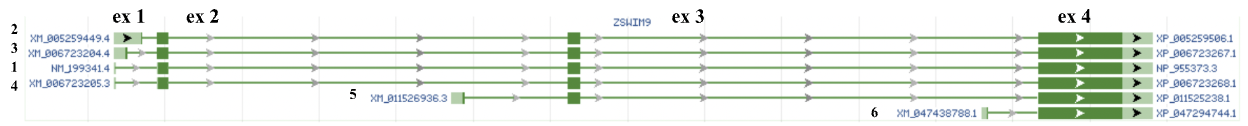
DNA sequences of ZSWIM9 transcript variants with their exons labeled. Transcript variant 1 is labeled with a red box. Each exon (1-4) is labeled above, as well as the other variants.

ZSWIM9 has a total of six transcriptional variants with isoform 1 being the most complete and understood. All isoforms contain a conserved domain, FAR1, except X3 and X5, as well as the SWIM-type domain.

Transcript variants of ZSWIM9
Transcript Variant	Accession number	mRNA length (nucelotides)	Protein length (amino acids)	Molecular weight (kDa)
1	NM_199341.4	3600	920	101.7
X1	XM_006723204.4	3914	947	104.6
X2	XM_005259449.4	4281	933	103.2
X3	XM_006723205.3	3596	920	101.6
X4	XM_011526936.3	3624	848	93.1
X5	XM_047438788.1	3130	720	80.0

Exons present in each isoform of ZSWIM9
Isoform	Exon 1	Exon 2	Exon 3	Exon 4
1	✓	✓	✓	✓
X1	✓	✓	✓	✓
X2	✓	✓	✓	✓
X3	✓	✓	✓	✓
X4	x	x	✓	✓
X5	x	x	x	✓

== Protein ==
The human ZSWIM9 protein is 920 amino acids long with a molecular weight of 101.7 kDA and a theoretical isoelectric point of 8.51.

=== Composition ===
The human ZSWIM9 protein along with orthologs has higher than normal amounts of arginine, specifically around amino acids 379-421. Arginine has been seen to play a crucial role in genome stability and typically associated with interactions with nucleic acids, specific cellular localization (nucleus), or involvement in structural or enzymatic roles. The high concentration of arginine residues influences the protein's charge, binding properties, and potential regulatory functions. Arginine-rich proteins can play crucial roles in cell differentiation during embryonic development due to their involvement in processes that regulate gene expression, chromatin remodeling, and signaling pathways.

=== Conserved domains/motifs ===
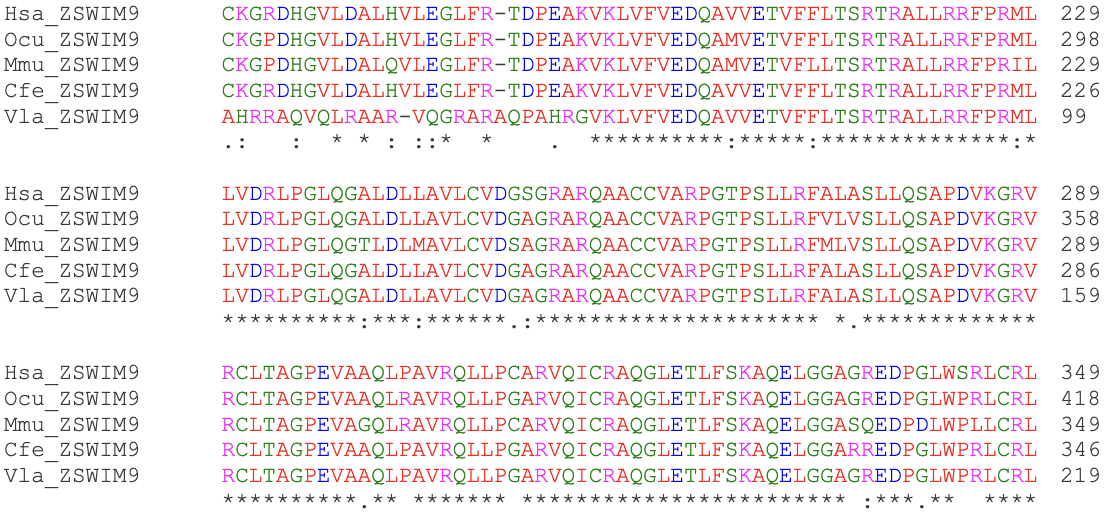
Multiple sequence alignment (MSA) of ZSWIM9 and its close orthologs, specifically showing the conserved FAR1 domain from amino acids 97-128.

ZSWIM9 contains a zinc finger SWIM-type profile, a pattern recognized in human protein ZSWIM9 and its orthologs that represent a shared zinc-binding motif. The acronym "SWIM" stands for SWI2/SNF2 and MuDR and detects conserved cysteine- and histidine-rich regions involved in zinc coordination, which facilitates protein-DNA or protein-protein interactions.

There is a conserved FAR1 DNA-binding domain from amino acids 97-128. This indicates that ZSWIM9, a member of the FRS family, shares a domain architecture with mutator-like transposases, including an N-terminal Cys_{2}His_{2} zinc finger domain, a central transposase-like domain, and a C-terminal SWIM motif. This structure, coupled with its FAR1-like DNA-binding domain, suggests ZSWIM9 functions as a transcriptional regulator, potentially co-opted from transposases to play roles in gene expression, DNA repair, or transposon splicing.

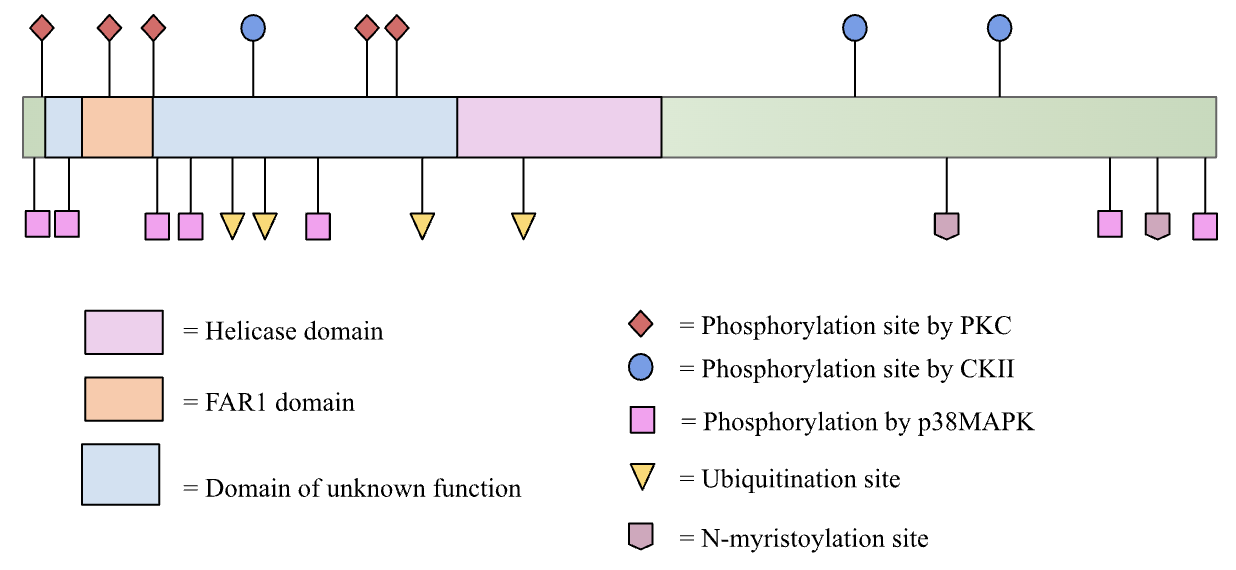
Schematic illustration of human protein ZSWIM9 with important domains, motifs, and post-translational modifications identified.

There is a family of unknown function (DUF5575) from amino acids 12-320.

== Regulation ==
=== Gene level regulation ===
Located in the nucleoplasm, ZSWIM9 in humans is ubiquitously expressed in medium abundance in the brain (fetal brain, and cerebellum), fat, and kidneys. Ubiquitously expressed, with some variability, in low abundance in early developed fetal hearts and fetal lungs.

While ZSWIM9 is expresses in low levels among fetal hearts, it has been predicted that there is a higher expression in earlier developed embryoid stem cells and embryoid bodies with beating cardiomyocytes, then a decreased level of expression later on in development such as in mature cardiomyocytes from fetal hearts. This suggests ZSWIM9 might play a role in early differentiation stages and cellular commitment processes.

Additionally, higher expression of ZSWIM9 was seen in myotonic dystrophy type 2, which is muscle dysfunction in numerous muscle types including cardiac, compared to a control from DM2 vastus lateralis muscle tissue. Higher expression suggests that ZSWIM9 may have a role in the muscle’s response to chronic disease-related stress, regeneration process, or damage repair. This pattern of expression may reflect ZSWIM9’s involvement in cellular pathways that become more active or dysregulated in the disease state.

=== Protein level regulation ===
The human ZSWIM9 protein is predicted to be primarily localized in the nucleus and cytoplasm, however, it has also been visualized via immunofluorescence in the nucleoplasm. It was also predicted ZSWIM9 has nuclear export signals, which direct proteins from the nucleus to the cytoplasm. The presence of an NES indicates the protein may shuttle between the nucleus and cytoplasm, depending on cellular conditions or specific signals (e.g., stress, phosphorylation).

Phosphorylation

== Interacting proteins ==
ZSWIM9 was found to primarily interact with proteins involved with DNA maintenance in the nucleus, cytoplasm, and nucleoplasm.

ZSWIM9 interacting proteins
Protein	Detection method	Subcellular localization	Function
Chromobox protein homolog 1	Tandem affinity purification	Nucleus, nucleoplasm, chromosome, cytoskeleton	Component of heterochromatin. Recognizes and binds histone H3 tails methylated at 'Lys-9', leading to epigenetic repression. Interaction with lamin B receptor (LBR) can contribute to the association of the heterochromatin with the inner nuclear membrane.
BMI1 (Polycomb complex protein)	Co-immunoprecipitation	Nucleus, nucleoplasm, chromosome, cytosol	Component of a Polycomb group (PcG) multiprotein PRC1-like complex, a complex class required to maintain the transcriptionally repressive state of many genes, including Hox genes, throughout development.
CBX3 (Chromobox 3)	Co-immunoprecipitation	Nucleus, nuclear envelope, nucleoplasm, chromosome, cytoskeleton	Seems to be involved in transcriptional silencing in heterochromatin-like complexes. Recognizes and binds histone H3 tails methylated at 'Lys-9', leading to epigenetic repression. May contribute to the association of the heterochromatin with the inner nuclear membrane through its interaction with the lamin B receptor (LBR).
FHL3 (Human four-and-a-half LIM-only protein 3)	Co-immunoprecipitation	Nucleus, cytoskeleton	Recruited by SOX15 to FOXK1 promoters where it acts as a transcriptional coactivator of FOXK1.

Histone 3 (H3) is an arginine-rich histone and is linked active chromatin structures and gene activation.

Hox genes are a group of related genes that play a critical role in the development and organization of an organism's body plan during embryonic development. This is indicative of ZSWIM9 protein function.

SOX15 binds to the DNA consensus sequence 5'-AACAATG-3' and can function as both an activator and repressor. It synergistically interacts with POU5F1 (OCT3/4) at gene promoters and activates the FOXK1 promoter by recruiting FHL3, promoting myoblast proliferation. Additionally, it inhibits myoblast differentiation by repressing muscle-specific genes like MYOD and MYOG.

== Evolution ==
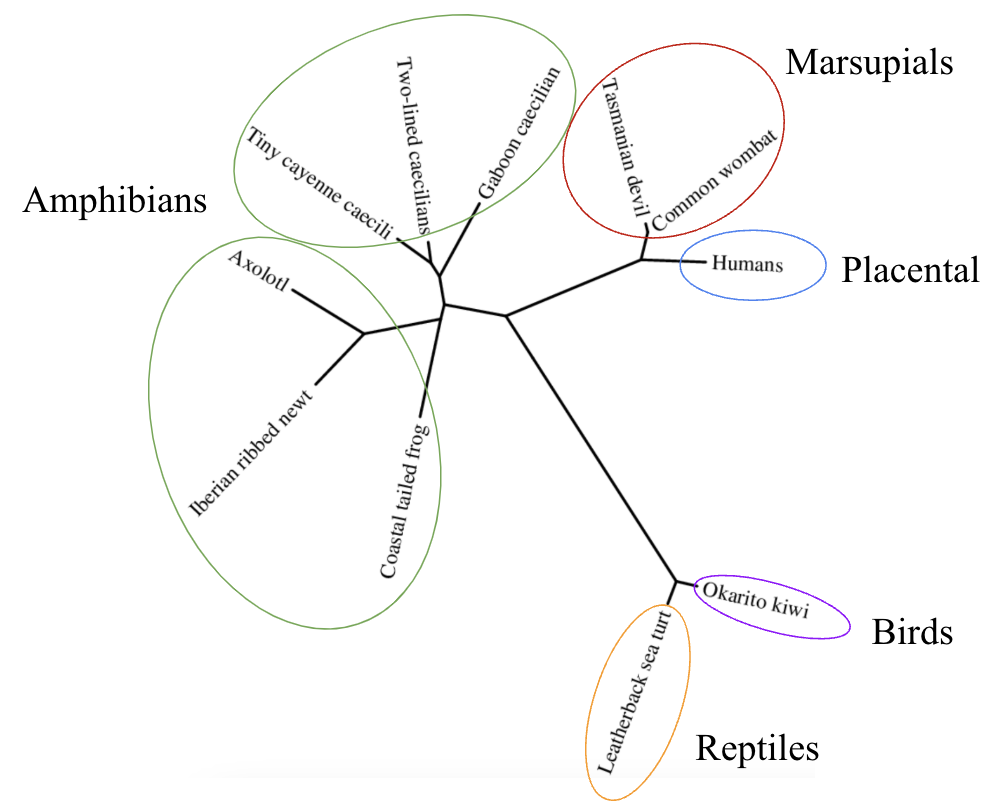
Phylogenetic tree showing the evolutionary history of ZSWIM9 protein in humans and its orthologs. Each circle shows taxonomic groups represented by orthologs found in table 1. Some orthologs were not including due to crowding, but each taxonomic group within the twenty orthologs of ZSWIM9 is represented.

=== Paralogs ===
ZSWIM9 has paralogs in ZSWIM1-8 as it is a part of the zinc finger SWIM-type gene family and the SWIM domain is conserved throughout. However, it's two closely conserved paralogs are ZSWIM1 and ZSWIM3.

=== Orthologs ===
Orthologs of ZSWIM9 were found in placental mammals, marsupials, reptiles, birds, and amphibians. ZSWIM9 is found in reptiles, but only in turtles and in birds, but only in flightless birds. This could indicate a key point of divergence or a result of ZSWIM9 protein function.

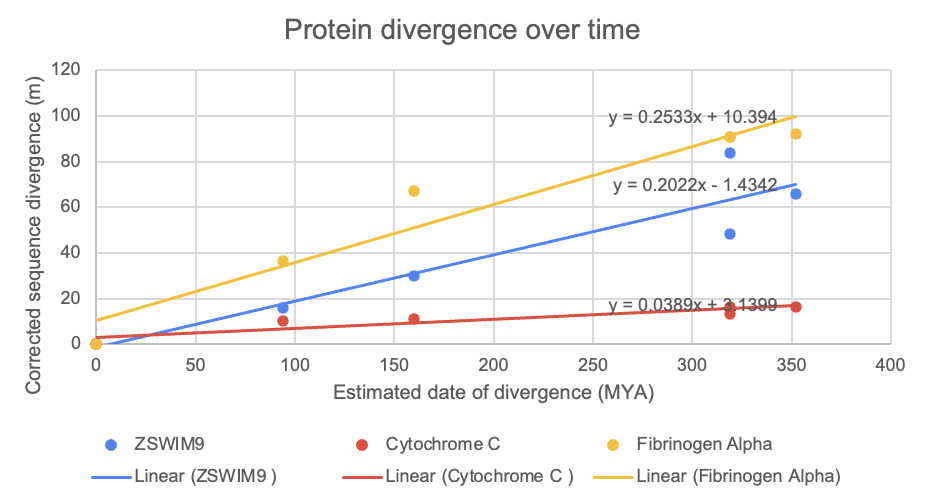
Graph of the estimated date of divergence linearly, based on ZSWIM9 compared to Cytochrome C and Fibrinogen Alpha. ZSWIM9 mutates faster than Cytochrome C but not faster than Fibrinogen Alpha. The ZSWIM gene family likely appeared around 350 million years ago due to the fact that it doesn’t have known orthologs before amphibians.

Selected Orthologs of ZSWIM9
Organism type	Species name	Common name	Taxonomic group	Date of divergence (MYA)	% Identity	% Similarity	AC#	Protein length
Placental	Homo sapiens	Human	Primate	0	100	100	NP_955373	920
Placental	Oryctolagus cuniculus	Rabbit	Lagomorpha	87	69	73	XP_051693391	913
Placental	Mus musculus	House mouse	Rodentia	87	67.9	74.2	NP_796286.2	849
Placental	Camelus ferus	Wild Bactrian camel	Artiodactyla	94	85.4	89.2	XP_032341552.1	923
Placental	Vulpes lagopus	Arctic fox	Carnivora	94	84.8	69.6	XP_041600653	915
Placental	Equus przewalskii	Przewalski's horse	Perissodactyla	94	47.8	51.4	XP_008525788	611
Marsupial	Trichosurus vulpecula	Common brushtail possum	Diprotodotia	160	80.2	48.1	XP_036599503.1	717
Marsupial	Vombatus ursinus	Common wombat	Diprotodotia	160	75.6	65.2	XP_027715069.1	966
Marsupial	Antechinus flavipes	Yellow-footed antechinus	Dasyuromorphia	160	74.4	56.2	XP_051845809	898
Marsupial	Sarcophilus harrisii	Tasmanian devil	Dasyuromorphia	160	74.3	62.7	XP_031817585	1030
Reptile	Dermochelys coriacea	Leatherback sea turtle	Testudines	319	61.9	43.2	XP_043357605.1	538
Reptile	Emydura macquarii	Murrey river turtle	Testudines	319	61.8	43.6	XP_067413334.1	538
Bird	Rhea pennata	Darwin's rhea	Rheiformes	319	44.2	33.5	XP_062449005.1	535
Bird	Apteryx rowi	Okarito kiwi	Apterygiformes	319	43.3	33.4	XP_025945372.1	535
Bird	Dromaius novaehollandiae	Emu	Palaeognathae	319	43.1	33.5	XP_025976311.1	535
Amphibian	Rhinatrema bivittatum	Two-lined caecilian	Gymnophiona	352	51.9	39.7	XP_029440252.1	548
Amphibian	Geotrypetes seraphini	Gaboon caecilian	Gymnophiona	352	50.1	38.5	XP_038816602.1	548
Amphibian	Microcaecilia unicolor	Tiny cayenne caecilian	Gymnophiona	352	50	38.5	XP_030053572.1	544
Amphibian	Ascaphus truei	Coastal tailed frog	Anura	352	49.3	38.3	MEE6483311.1	536
Amphibian	Ambystoma mexicanum	Axolotl	Urodela	352	46.9	36.6	XP_069493689.1	544
Amphibian	Pleurodeles waltl	Iberian ribbed newt	Urodela	352	45.8	34.9	XP_069056600.1	580

== Function ==
Zinc-finger proteins contain a short finger-like structural motif stabilized by zinc-ions which are involved in critical biological processes including cell differentiation and embryonic development. ZSWIM9, however, is classified by the SWIM domain, characterized by a CxCxnCxH molecular structure. The SWIM domain is predicted to have DNA-binding and protein-protein interaction functions.

== Clinical significance ==
A couple of single nucleotide polymorphisms (SNPs) were identified as clinically significant and associated with ZSWIM9. One study associate a SNP in ZSWIM9 with acute Graft versus Host Disease (aGvHD) which affects patients undergoing allogeneic hematopoietic stem-cell transplantation (allo-HSCT). This condition is triggered by the damage to normal tissue caused by pre-transplant conditioning regimens, with DNA-repair mechanisms potentially playing a key role in mitigating this damage. This could be associated with proteins involved in cell differentiation through several mechanisms related to DNA repair, gene expression regulation, and cellular responses to stress or injury.

An additional SNP was identified with ZSWIM9 and associated with body height.
