= Clypeopyrenis porinoides =

Scientific classification
- Kingdom: Fungi
- Division: Ascomycota
- Class: Eurotiomycetes
- Order: Pyrenulales
- Family: Pyrenulaceae
- Genus: Clypeopyrenis
- Species: C. porinoides

Binomial name
- Clypeopyrenis porinoides Komposch, J.E.Hern. & Rosabal (2011)

Species of lichen

Clypeopyrenis porinoides is a species of corticolous (bark-dwelling) lichen in the family Pyrenulaceae. Found in Costa Rica, where it grows primarily on tree trunks and the understory of primary forests, it was described as new to science in 2011. Closely resembling some Porina species, this lichen is characterised by its light greyish-green surface and distinctive perithecia that set it apart from its close relative, Clypeopyrenis microsperma.

== Taxonomy ==
Clypeopyrenis porinoides was first described by Harald Komposch, Jesús Ernesto Hernández Maldonado, and Dania Rosabal in 2011. The type specimen was collected from Sán Vito de Coto Brus, Las Cruces Biological Station, Puntarenas, Costa Rica at an elevation of 1,200 m (3,900 ft). The specific epithet porinoides refers to its resemblance to species of Porina.

== Description ==
The thallus of Clypeopyrenis porinoides is corticolous (growing on bark) and can reach up to 10 cm (4 in) in diameter. Its surface is smooth to uneven and light greyish-green in colour. The perithecia are wart-shaped, measuring 0.4–0.6 mm in diameter and 0.3–0.4 mm in height. They can be found either solitary or in groups of 2 or 3, completely covered by a thalline layer up to the ostiole, giving them a light greyish-green to yellowish-green appearance.

Microscopic examination reveals that this species has clavate (club-shaped) asci (40–50 by 6–8 μm) and dark brown, ellipsoid ascospores (5–6 by 2.5–3 μm) with rounded ends, a single septum, and a slight constriction at the septum. No secondary chemical substances were detected in the lichen by thin-layer chromatography.

== Habitat and distribution ==
Clypeopyrenis porinoides is known to be found abundantly in the understory of primary rainforests at mid-elevation, specifically at its type locality, the Las Cruces Biological Station in Costa Rica. Its distribution outside this area remains unknown.
