= Adelphicos sargii =

Conservation status
- Least Concern (IUCN 3.1)

Scientific classification
- Kingdom: Animalia
- Phylum: Chordata
- Class: Reptilia
- Order: Squamata
- Suborder: Serpentes
- Family: Colubridae
- Genus: Adelphicos
- Species: A. sargii

Binomial name
- Adelphicos sargii (Fischer, 1885)

Species of snake

Adelphicos sargii, Sargi's earth snake, is a colubrid snake found in Mexico and Guatemala.
