= Adelphicos ibarrorum =

Conservation status
- Endangered (IUCN 3.1)

Scientific classification
- Kingdom: Animalia
- Phylum: Chordata
- Class: Reptilia
- Order: Squamata
- Suborder: Serpentes
- Family: Colubridae
- Genus: Adelphicos
- Species: A. ibarrorum

Binomial name
- Adelphicos ibarrorum Campbell & Brodie, 1988

Species of reptile

Adelphicos ibarrorum is a species of snake in the family Colubridae. The species is endemic to Guatemala.

== Etymology ==
The specific name, ibarrorum (Latin, genitive, plural), is in honor of the Guatemalan Ibarra family, especially Jorge Alfonso Ibarra (1921–2000) and Germán A. Ibarra, both conservationists and naturalists.

== Geographic range ==
A. ibarrorum is only known from the highlands of south-central Guatemala in the region of its type locality near Chichicastenango.

== Behavior and habitat ==
A fossorial snake, A. ibarrorum is known from pine-oak forest and forest edge habitats, at elevations of 2,000–2,100 m (6,600–6,900 ft) above sea level.

== Conservation status ==
The species A. ibarrorum is considered to be "Endangered". It is threatened by deforestation for agricultural purposes.

== Description ==
The largest known specimen and the holotype of A. ibarrorum is a female measuring 521 mm (20.5 in) in total length, including a tail length of 58 mm (2.3 in).

== Reproduction ==
A. ibarrorum is oviparous.
