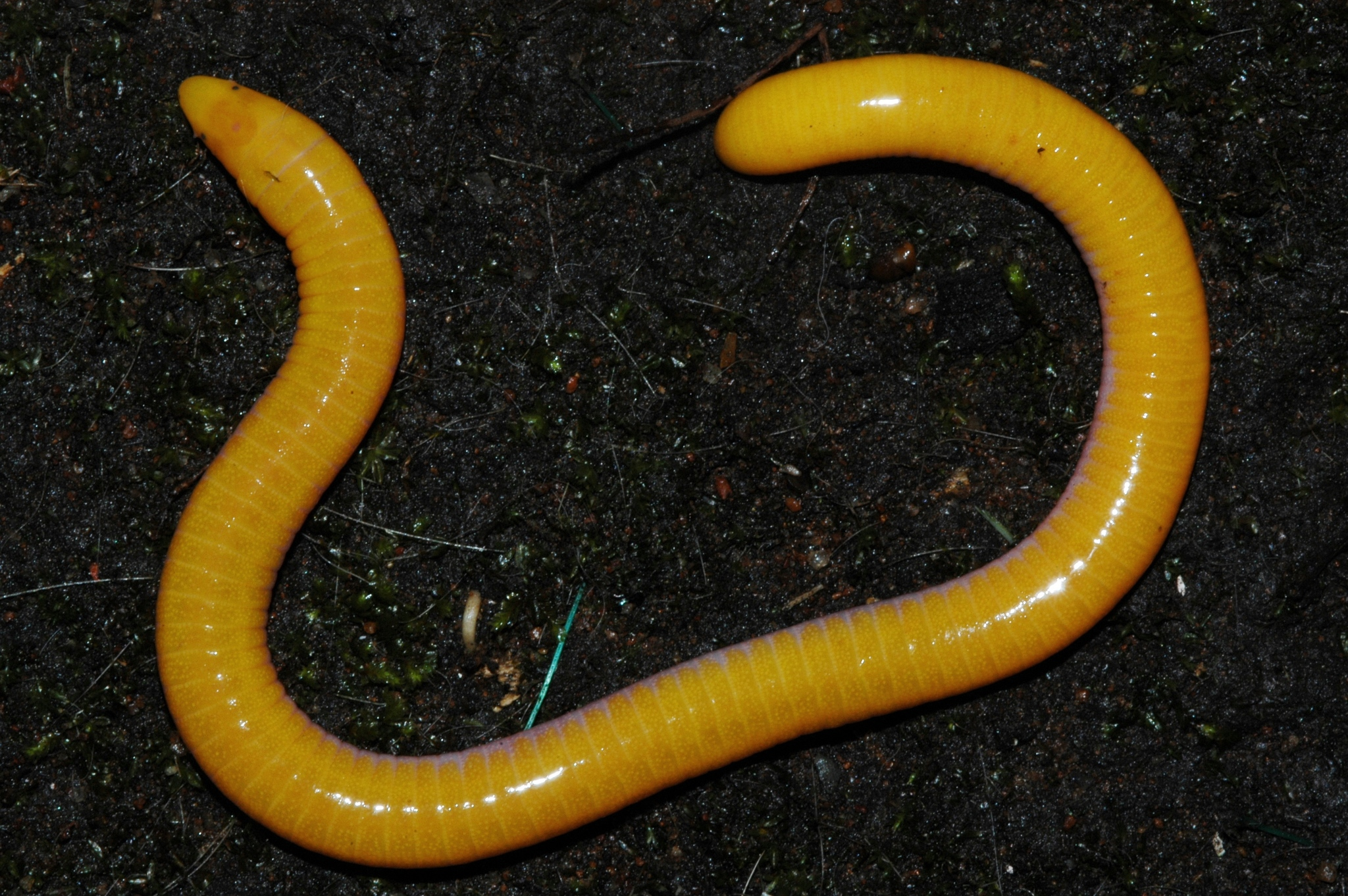
- Schistometopum thomense

Scientific classification
- Domain: Eukaryota
- Kingdom: Animalia
- Phylum: Chordata
- Class: Amphibia
- Order: Gymnophiona
- Clade: Apoda
- Family: Dermophiidae
- Genus: Schistometopum; Parker, 1941

Species
- See text

= Schistometopum =

Genus of amphibians

Schistometopum is a genus of amphibian in the family Dermophiidae. S. thomense is only known from two islands in the Bight of Benin, but has been reported from "Upper Zaïre". This likely refers to an undiscovered third species.

== Species ==
Binomial name and author	Common name
Schistometopum gregorii (Boulenger, 1895)	Witu caecilian, mud-dwelling caecilian, flood-plain-dwelling caecilian
Schistometopum thomense (Bocage, 1873)	São Tomé caecilian, Sao Tome caecilian, São Thomé caecilian, Aqua Ize caecilian, island caecilian, cobra bobo
