= Gymnopis syntrema =

Conservation status
- Near Threatened (IUCN 3.1)

Scientific classification
- Kingdom: Animalia
- Phylum: Chordata
- Class: Amphibia
- Order: Gymnophiona
- Clade: Apoda
- Family: Dermophiidae
- Genus: Gymnopis
- Species: G. syntrema

Binomial name
- Gymnopis syntrema (Cope, 1866)

Synonyms
- Gymnopis oligozona Cope, "1878" 1877; Minascaecilia sartoria Campbell and Wake, 1983

Species of amphibian

Gymnopis syntrema is a species of caecilian in the family Dermophiidae. It is found in Belize, Guatemala, and possibly Honduras. Its natural habitats are subtropical or tropical moist lowland forests, subtropical or tropical moist montane forests, plantations, rural gardens, and heavily degraded former forest. It is threatened by habitat loss.
