= Dermophis occidentalis =

Conservation status
- Least Concern (IUCN 3.1)

Scientific classification
- Kingdom: Animalia
- Phylum: Chordata
- Class: Amphibia
- Order: Gymnophiona
- Clade: Apoda
- Family: Dermophiidae
- Genus: Dermophis
- Species: D. occidentalis

Binomial name
- Dermophis occidentalis Taylor, 1955

Species of amphibian

Dermophis occidentalis is a species of caecilian in the family Dermophiidae. It is endemic to south-western Costa Rica and occurs in the Pacific lowlands and premontane slopes, extending to the western part of the central valley. Its taxonomic status is unclear.

== Description ==
Dermophis occidentalis is a small-sized caecilian measuring 192–235 mm (7.6–9.3 in) in total length. It has 95–112 primary and 29–37 secondary annuli. The body is slender, with its length 30 to 32 times the body width.). The head is narrow and light grayish tan in color. The body is dorsally lavender plumbeous, turning lighter ventrally.

== Habitat and conservation ==
Dermophis occidentalis occurs in lowland and submontane rainforests at elevations of 365–970 m (1,198–3,182 ft) above sea level. It is a subterranean species that can be found under logs and in leaf litter. It is viviparous.

Dermophis occidentalis is a poorly known species. Deforestation might be a threat to it. Its range overlaps with the Corcovado National Park, among others.
