= Clypeopyrenis =

Scientific classification
- Domain: Eukaryota
- Kingdom: Fungi
- Division: Ascomycota
- Class: Eurotiomycetes
- Order: Pyrenulales
- Family: Pyrenulaceae
- Genus: Clypeopyrenis; Aptroot (1991)

Type species
- Clypeopyrenis microsperma (Müll.Arg.) Aptroot (1991)

Species
- C. microsperma C. porinoides

Genus of lichens

Clypeopyrenis is a genus of lichen-forming fungi in the family Pyrenulaceae. The genus was circumscribed in 1991 by Dutch lichenologist André Aptroot, with Clypeopyrenis microsperma assigned as the type species. This lichen, originally described from material collected in Costa Rica, is also found in the Caribbean and South America. Clypeopyrenis porinoides was added to the genus in 2011; it was discovered in Costa Rica, close to the type locality of the type species.
