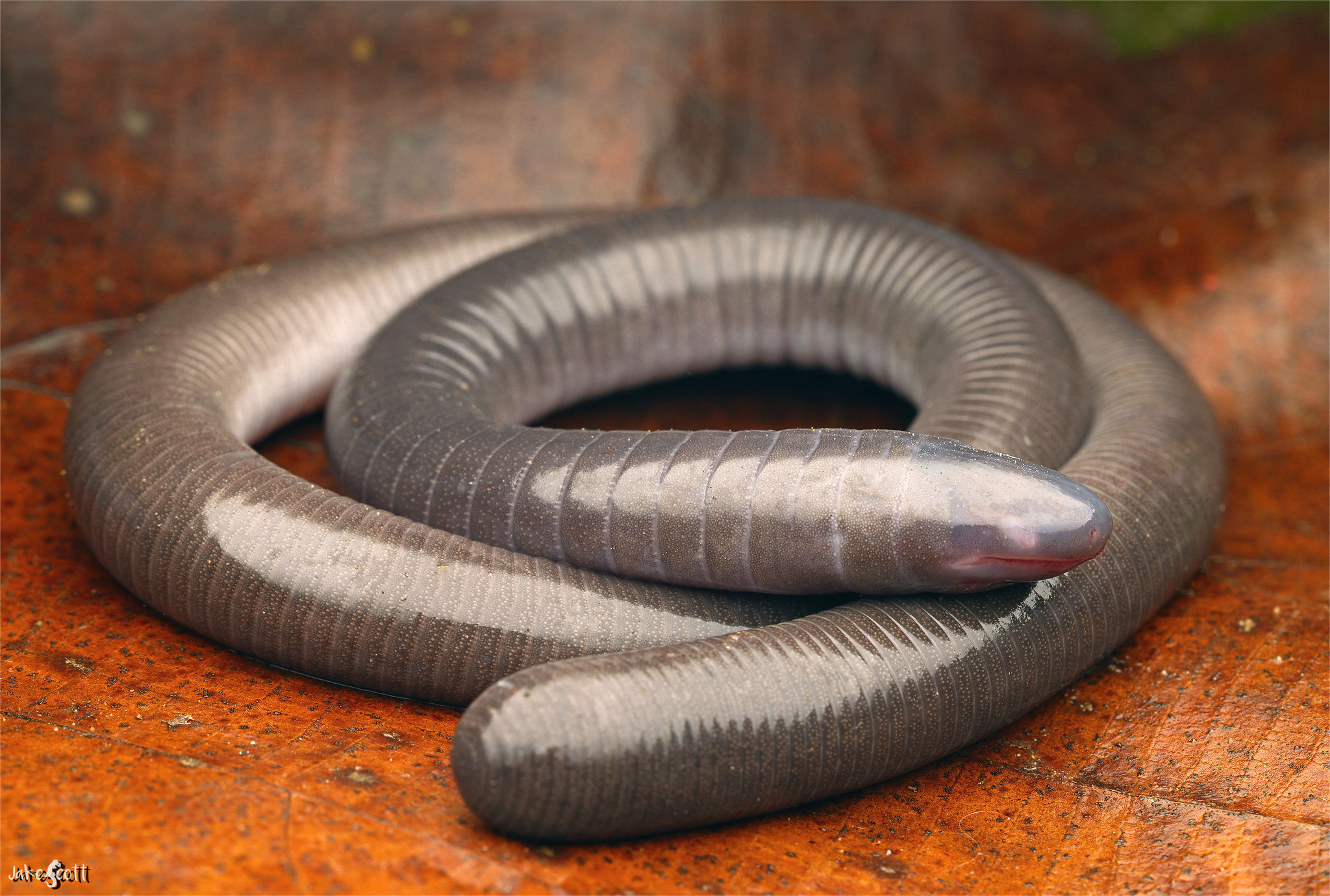

Conservation status
- Least Concern (IUCN 3.1)

Scientific classification
- Kingdom: Animalia
- Phylum: Chordata
- Class: Amphibia
- Order: Gymnophiona
- Clade: Apoda
- Family: Dermophiidae
- Genus: Gymnopis
- Species: G. multiplicata

Binomial name
- Gymnopis multiplicata Peters, 1874

Synonyms
- Siphonops proximus Cope, "1878" 1877; Siphonops simus Cope, "1878" 1877

= Gymnopis multiplicata =

Species of amphibian

Gymnopis multiplicata is a species of caecilian in the family Dermophiidae found in Costa Rica, Honduras, Nicaragua, Panama, and possibly Guatemala. Its natural habitats are subtropical or tropical dry forests, subtropical or tropical moist lowland forests, subtropical or tropical moist montane forests, pastureland, plantations, rural gardens, and urban areas.
