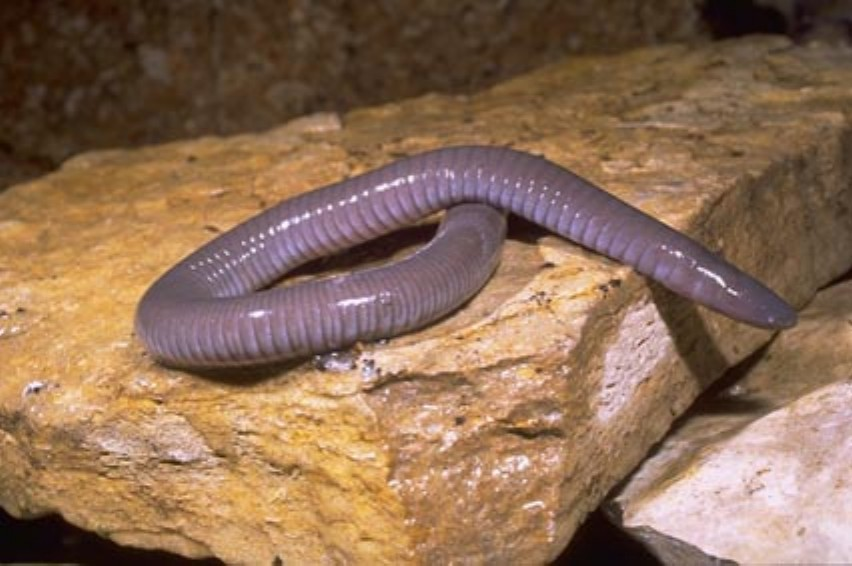
- Dermophis mexicanus

Scientific classification
- Kingdom: Animalia
- Phylum: Chordata
- Class: Amphibia
- Order: Gymnophiona
- Clade: Apoda
- Family: Dermophiidae; Taylor, 1969

Genera
- Dermophis; Geotrypetes; Gymnopis; Schistometopum

= Dermophiidae =

Family of amphibians

The Dermophiidae are a family of neotropical caecilians. They are found in Central and South America, and Africa. Like other caecilians, they superficially resemble worms or snakes.

They are the only viviparous caecilians (species that give birth to live young) with secondary annuli (rings around the body).

== Species ==
- Genus Dermophis
  - Dermophis costaricense
  - Dermophis glandulosus
  - Dermophis gracilior
  - Dermophis mexicanus - Mexican burrowing caecilian
  - Dermophis oaxacae
  - Dermophis occidentalis
  - Dermophis parviceps
- Genus Geotrypetes – West African caecilians
  - Geotrypetes angeli
  - Geotrypetes pseudoangeli
  - Geotrypetes seraphini, Gaboon caecilian
- Genus Gymnopis – wet forest caecilians
  - Gymnopis multiplicata
  - Gymnopis syntrema
- Genus Schistometopum – Guinea caecilians
  - Schistometopum ephele
  - Schistometopum gregorii
  - Schistometopum thomense
