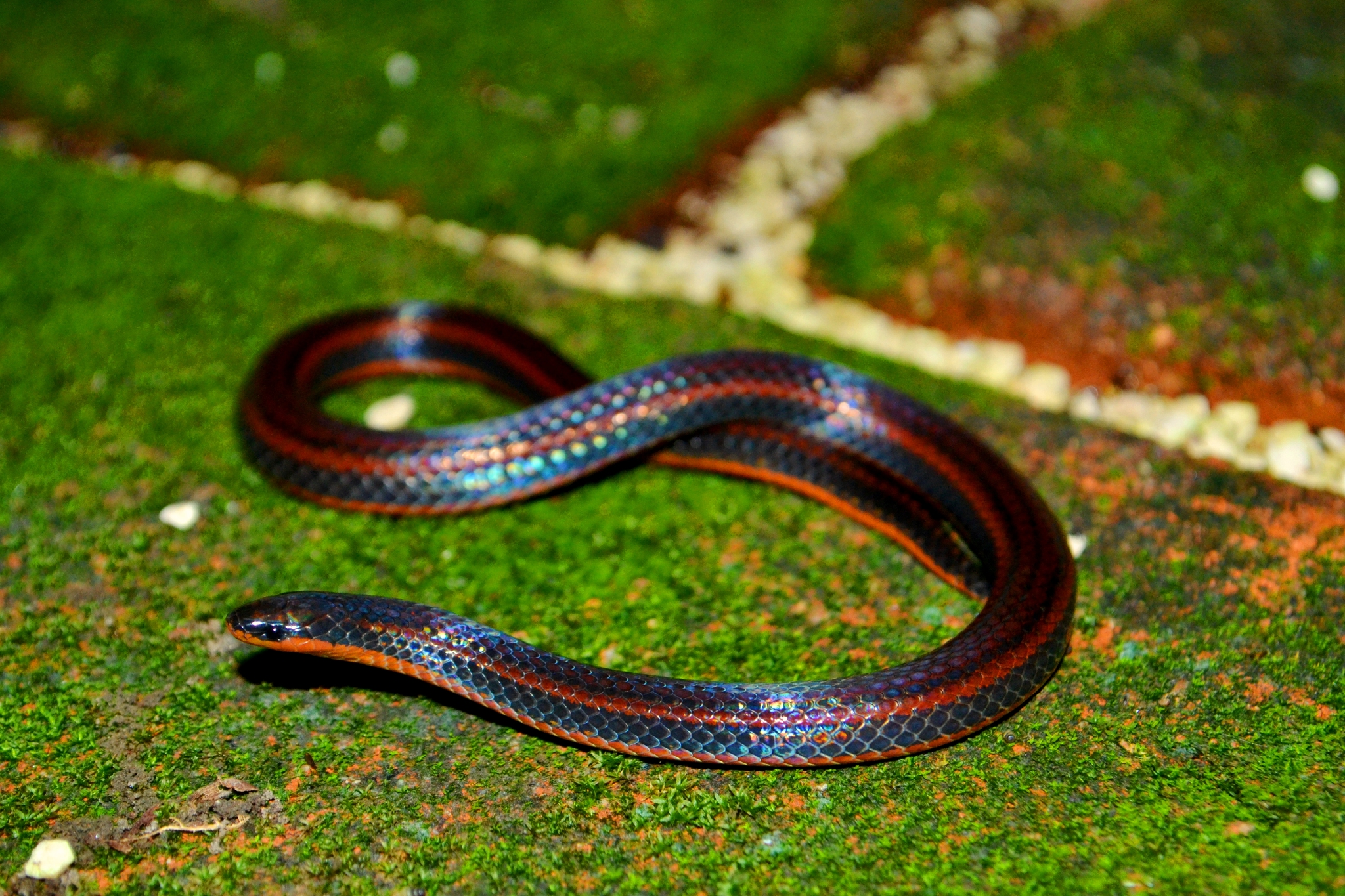

Conservation status
- Least Concern (IUCN 3.1)

Scientific classification
- Kingdom: Animalia
- Phylum: Chordata
- Class: Reptilia
- Order: Squamata
- Suborder: Serpentes
- Family: Colubridae
- Genus: Adelphicos
- Species: A. nigrilatum

Binomial name
- Adelphicos nigrilatum Smith, 1942
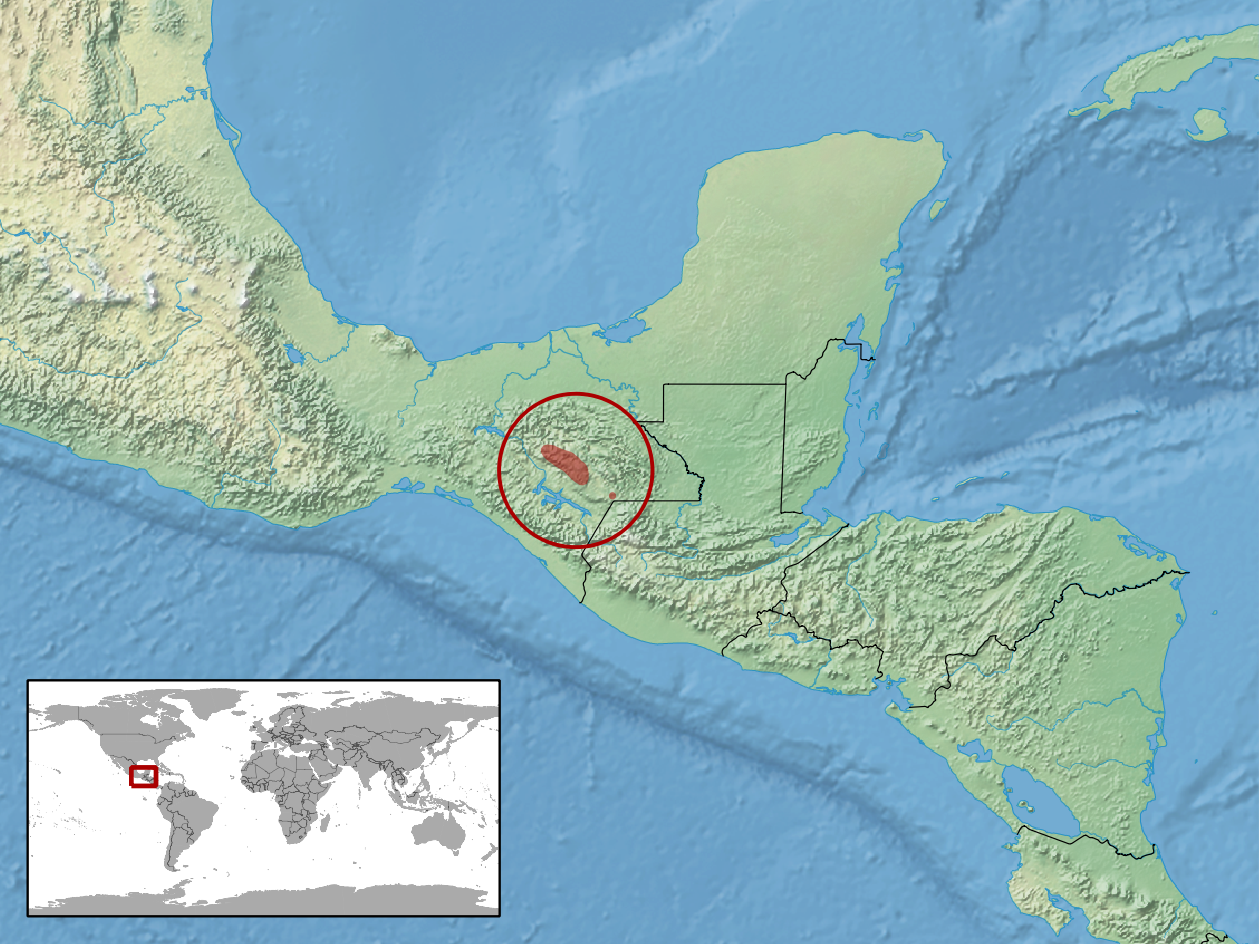

= Adelphicos nigrilatum =

Species of snake

Adelphicos nigrilatum, the burrowing snake, is a species of colubrid snake found in Mexico.
