= Dermophis gracilior =

Conservation status
- Data Deficient (IUCN 3.1)

Scientific classification
- Kingdom: Animalia
- Phylum: Chordata
- Class: Amphibia
- Order: Gymnophiona
- Clade: Apoda
- Family: Dermophiidae
- Genus: Dermophis
- Species: D. gracilior

Binomial name
- Dermophis gracilior Günther, 1902

Synonyms
- Dermophis mexicanus gracilior – Dunn, 1928

Species of amphibian

Dermophis gracilior is a species of caecilian in the family Dermophiidae. It is found on the Pacific slopes of Cordillera de Talamanca in eastern Costa Rica and western Panama, as well as in the central Pacific Costa Rica. Some sources also report it from the Atlantic slope of Costa Rica.

== Description ==
Dermophis gracilior is a moderate-sized caecilian measuring 255–387 mm (10.0–15.2 in) in total length. It has 91–117 primary and 65–96 secondary annuli. The body is somewhat robust (length 23 to 34 times the body width). The upper surface is lead-gray in color, whereas the lower one is cream with dark mottling, or largely gray to dull black. The annular grooves are similarly colored as the adjacent areas.

== Habitat and conservation ==
Dermophis gracilior occurs in humid lowland, premontane, and montane forests at elevations 404–2,000 m (1,325–6,562 ft) above sea level. It is a subterranean species that can be found under logs and surface debris. It is probably viviparous.

D. gracilior is a poorly known species known from few specimens. Deforestation might be a threat to it. It is found in the La Amistad International Park (Panama) and in the Las Cruces Biological Station (Costa Rica).
