= Adelphicos latifasciatum =

Conservation status
- Data Deficient (IUCN 3.1)

Scientific classification
- Kingdom: Animalia
- Phylum: Chordata
- Class: Reptilia
- Order: Squamata
- Suborder: Serpentes
- Family: Colubridae
- Genus: Adelphicos
- Species: A. latifasciatum

Binomial name
- Adelphicos latifasciatum Lynch & Smith, 1966
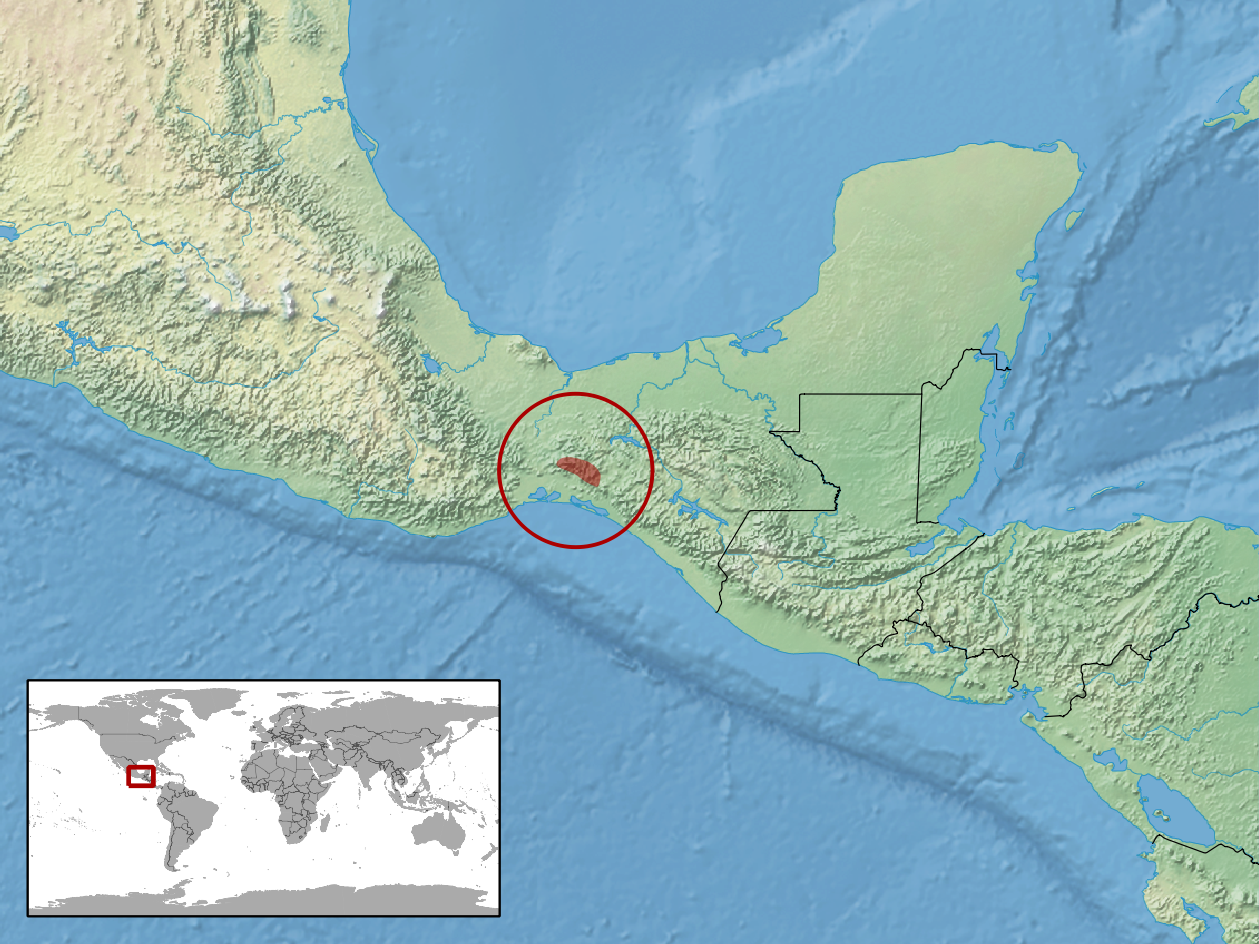

Synonyms
- Adelphicos latifasciatus Lynch & Smith, 1966

Species of snake

Adelphicos latifasciatum, the Oaxaca burrowing snake, is a colubrid snake described by John D. Lynch and Hobart Muir Smith in 1966.

The Oaxaca burrowing snake lives in the humus of the pine and cloud forests of the Sierra de los Chimalapas and Cerro Baúl in Oaxaca and western Chiapas, Mexico. It is protected by law in Mexico and also inhabits the La Sepultura Biosphere Reserve and protected forests in Los Chimalapas.

The Oaxaca burrowing snake's biggest threats to survival include forest fires and deforestation.
