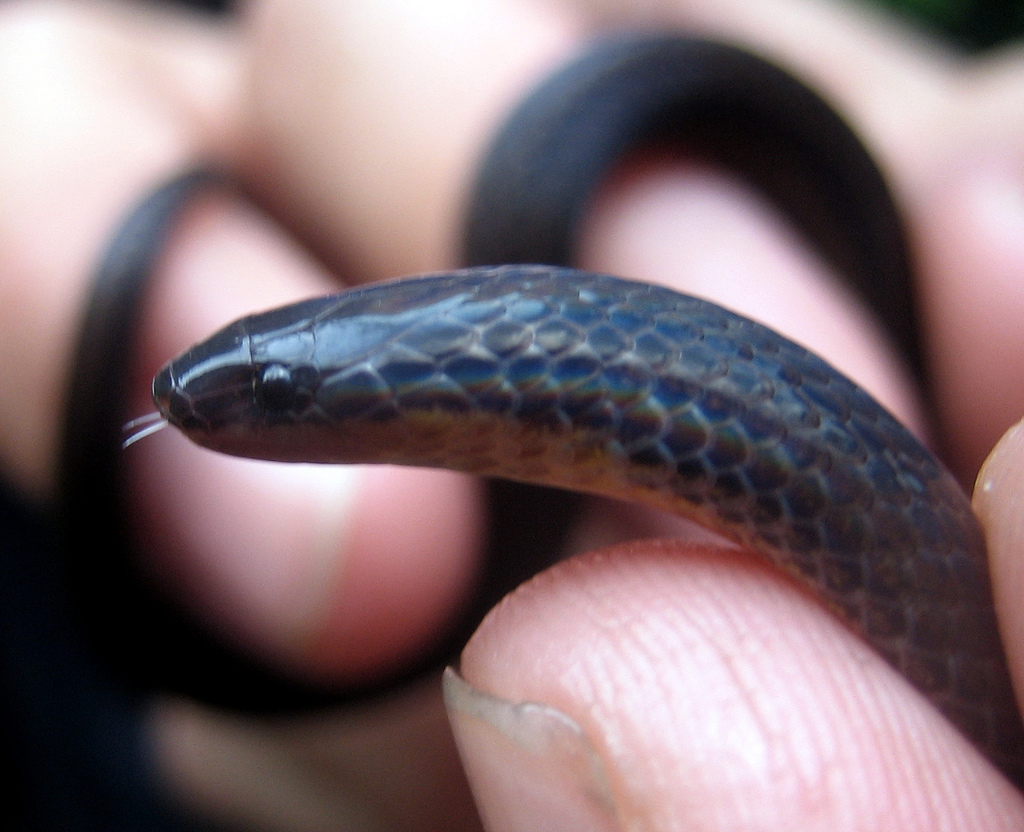
- Adelphicos quadrivirgatum

Scientific classification
- Kingdom: Animalia
- Phylum: Chordata
- Class: Reptilia
- Order: Squamata
- Suborder: Serpentes
- Family: Colubridae
- Subfamily: Dipsadinae
- Genus: Adelphicos; Jan, 1862

= Adelphicos =

Genus of snakes

Adelphicos is a genus of New World burrowing snakes in the subfamily Dipsadinae of the family Colubridae. The genus consists of nine species.

== Geographic range ==
Species of the genus Adelphicos can be found in Mexico and northern Central America (Belize and Guatemala).

== Species ==
There are nine species which are recognized as being valid.

- Adelphicos daryi Campbell & Ford, 1982 – Dary's burrowing snake
- Adelphicos ibarrorum Campbell & Brodie III, 1988 – Ibarras' burrowing snake
- Adelphicos latifasciatum J.D. Lynch & H.M. Smith, 1966 – Oaxaca burrowing snake
- Adelphicos newmanorum Taylor, 1950 – Middle American burrowing snake
- Adelphicos nigrilatum H.M. Smith, 1942 – burrowing snake
- Adelphicos quadrivirgatum Jan, 1862 – Middle American burrowing snake
- Adelphicos sargii (Fischer, 1885) – Sargi's earth snake
- Adelphicos veraepacis Stuart, 1941 – Stuart's burrowing snake
- Adelphicos visoninum (Cope, 1866) – Middle American burrowing snake

== Etymology ==
The generic name comes from the Greek "adelphikos," meaning "brotherly."

The specific name, newmanorum (Latin, genitive, plural), is in honor of American zoologist Robert J. Newman and his wife Marcella Newman.

The specific name, sargii (Latin, genitive, singular), is in honor of Franz Sarg (1840–1920) who served as German Consul in Guatemala.
