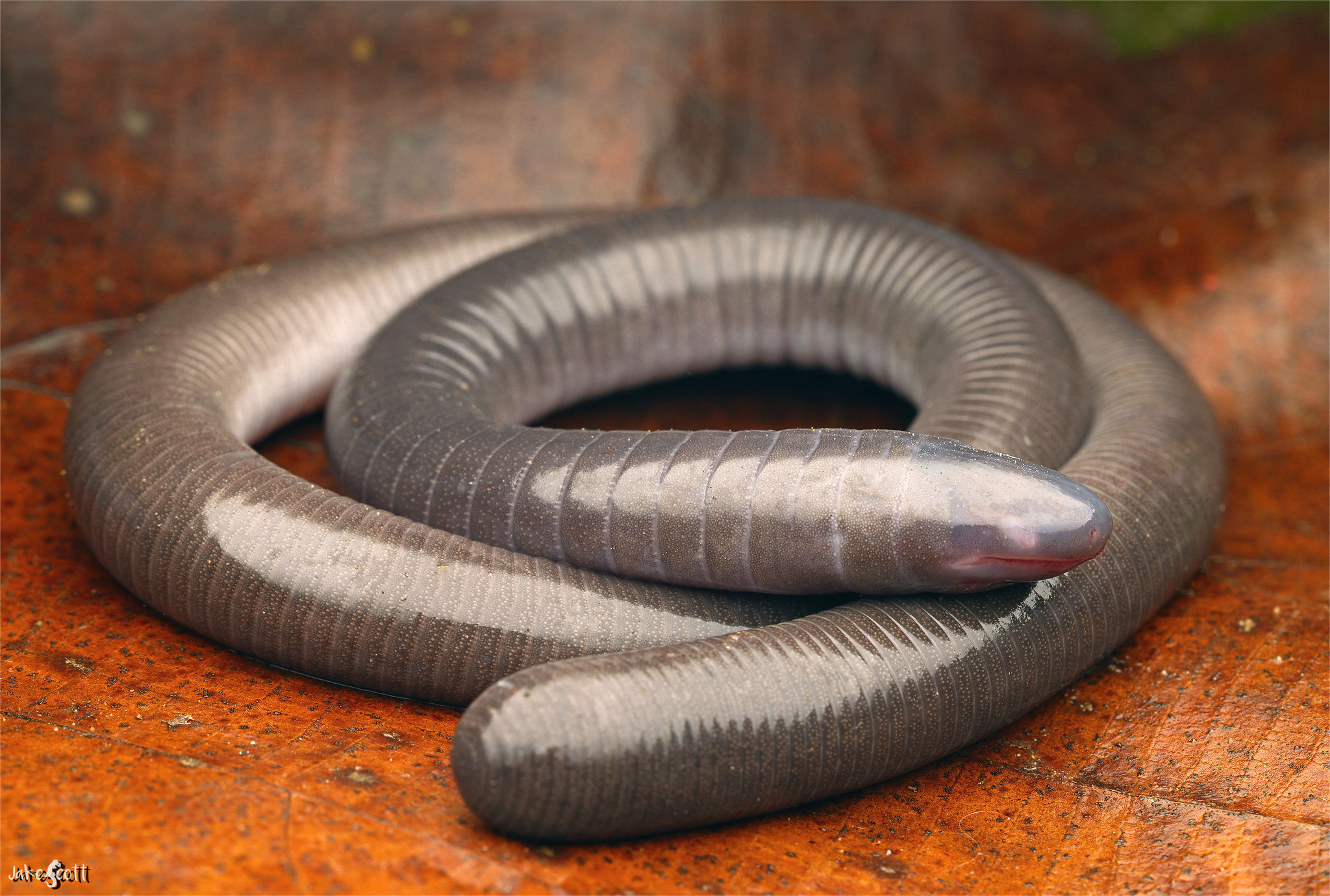
- Gymnopis multiplicata

Scientific classification
- Domain: Eukaryota
- Kingdom: Animalia
- Phylum: Chordata
- Class: Amphibia
- Order: Gymnophiona
- Clade: Apoda
- Family: Dermophiidae
- Genus: Gymnopis; Peters, 1874

Species
- See text

= Gymnopis =

Genus of amphibians

Gymnopis is a Central American genus of caecilian in the family Dermophiidae.

== Species ==
Binomial name and author	Common name
Gymnopis multiplicata Peters, 1874	purple caecilian, Varagua caecilian
Gymnopis syntrema (Cope, 1866)	wet forest caecilian, mountain caecilian
