= Adelphicos newmanorum =

Scientific classification
- Kingdom: Animalia
- Phylum: Chordata
- Class: Reptilia
- Order: Squamata
- Suborder: Serpentes
- Family: Colubridae
- Genus: Adelphicos
- Species: A. newmanorum

Binomial name
- Adelphicos newmanorum Taylor, 1950

Synonyms
- Adelphicos quadrivirgatum newmanorum Taylor, 1950

Species of snake

Adelphicos newmanorum, also known commonly as the Middle American burrowing snake, Newmans' earth snake, and la zacatera roja in Mexican Spanish, is a species of snake in the subfamily Dipsadinae of the family Colubridae. The species is endemic to Mexico and known from the Mexican states of Nuevo León, San Luis Potosí, and Tamaulipas.

== Etymology ==
Adelphicos newmanorum is named in honor of American zoologist Robert J. Newman and his wife Marcella Newman.

== Appearance ==
Adelphicos newmanorum is reddish-brown dorsally, and white ventrally. It is a small snake, average-sized for its genus.
