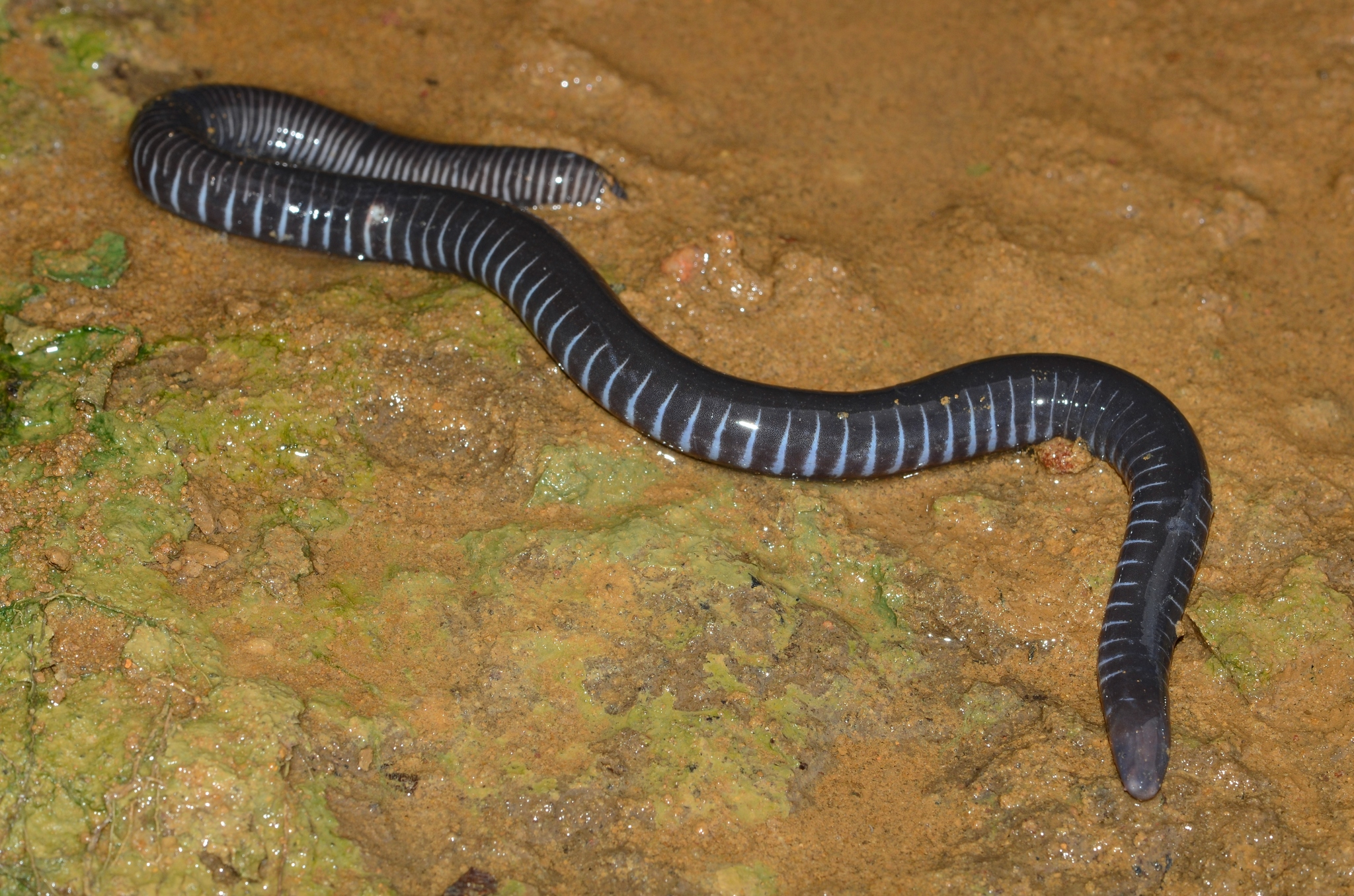
- Geotrypetes seraphini

Scientific classification
- Kingdom: Animalia
- Phylum: Chordata
- Class: Amphibia
- Order: Gymnophiona
- Clade: Apoda
- Family: Dermophiidae
- Genus: Geotrypetes; Peters, 1880

Species
- 3 species (see text)

= Geotrypetes =

Genus of amphibians

Geotrypetes is a genus of caecilians in the family Dermophiidae, although some classifications place it in the family Caeciliidae. They occur in tropical West Africa and are sometimes known as the West African caecilians.

== Species ==
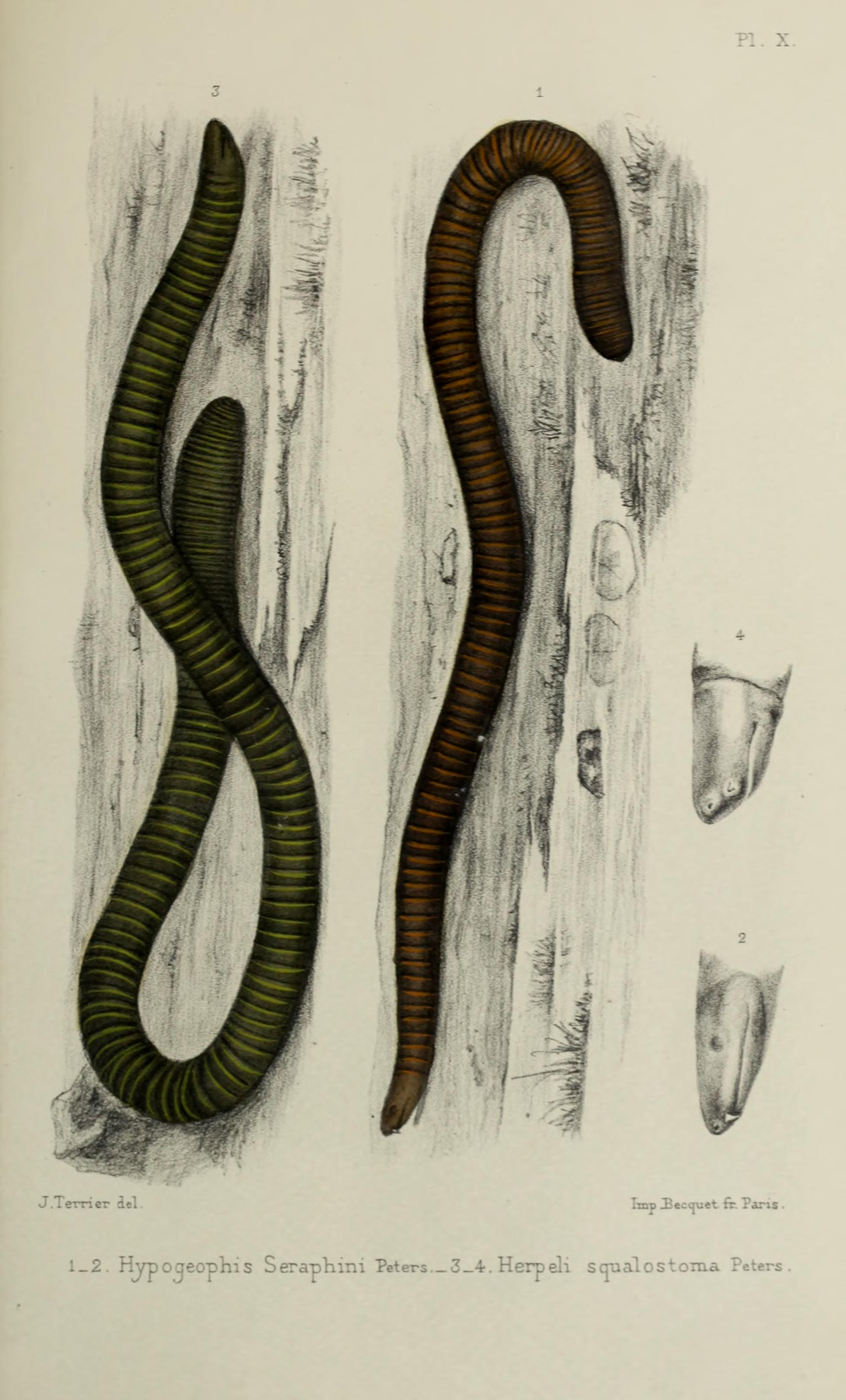
Illustration of Geotrypetes seraphini from Faune de la Sénégambie, vertébrés by Alphonse Trémeau de Rochebrune, 1883.

There are three species:

Binomial name and author	Common name
Geotrypetes angeli Parker, 1936	Angel's caecilian
Geotrypetes pseudoangeli Taylor, 1968	false Angel's caecilian
Geotrypetes seraphini (Duméril, 1859)	Gaboon caecilian
