= Dermophis oaxacae =

Conservation status
- Least Concern (IUCN 3.1)

Scientific classification
- Kingdom: Animalia
- Phylum: Chordata
- Class: Amphibia
- Order: Gymnophiona
- Clade: Apoda
- Family: Dermophiidae
- Genus: Dermophis
- Species: D. oaxacae

Binomial name
- Dermophis oaxacae (Mertens, 1930)

Synonyms
- Gymnopis multiplicata oaxacae Mertens, 1930 "1929"; Gymnopis multiplicatus oaxacae — Dunn, 1942; Dermophis multiplicatus oaxacae — Alvarez and Martín, 1967

Species of amphibian

Dermophis oaxacae, also known Oaxacan caecilian, is a species of caecilian in the family Dermophiidae. It is endemic to southwestern Mexico and occurs on the Pacific slopes and the Balsas depression in the states of Jalisco, Michoacán, Guerrero, Oaxaca, and Chiapas.

== Description ==
Dermophis oaxacae is a relatively large caecilian with a reported maximum total length of 454 mm (17.9 in). It has 119–139 primary and 101–133 secondary annuli; these high counts distinguish it from all other Dermophis. The body is somewhat robust and the head is relatively large. The mouth is subterminal. The eyes are visible through a layer of skin. Living animals have blue-black coloration. The annular grooves are ventrally marked with dark pigment, in sharp contrast to the otherwise pale venter.

== Habitat and conservation ==
Dermophis oaxacae occurs in semi-deciduous tropical forests at elevations up to 2,100 m (6,900 ft) above sea level. It is a subterranean species. It is probably viviparous.

Dermophis oaxacae is a poorly known species with few recent observations. It is unknown to which degree deforestation is a threat to it.
