= Schistometopum gregorii =

Conservation status
- Least Concern (IUCN 3.1)

Scientific classification
- Kingdom: Animalia
- Phylum: Chordata
- Class: Amphibia
- Order: Gymnophiona
- Clade: Apoda
- Family: Dermophiidae
- Genus: Schistometopum
- Species: S. gregorii

Binomial name
- Schistometopum gregorii (Boulenger, 1895)

Synonyms
- Dermophis gregorii Boulenger, 1895 "1894"; Bdellophis unicolor Boettger, 1913

Species of amphibian

Schistometopum gregorii, also known as Witu caecilian, mud-dwelling caecilian, and flood-plain-dwelling caecilian, is a species of amphibian in the family Dermophiidae from East Africa.

== Distribution ==
Schistometopum gregorii is endemic to the coastal East Africa in Kenya and Tanzania; it is known from the Tana River Delta area in Kenya (its type locality) and between Bagamoyo and Rufiji River in Tanzania. It is possible that the Kenyan and Tanzanian populations are distinct species.

== Etymology ==
The specific name gregorii honours John Walter Gregory, a British geologist and explorer and the collector of the holotype.

== Description ==
Schistometopum gregorii is glossy black dorsolaterally and somewhat lighter ventrally. There are 110–119 primary annuli (ring-shaped folds). Kenyan males measure 141–336 mm (5.6–13.2 in) (mean 247 mm) and females 152–350 mm (6.0–13.8 in) (mean 260 mm) in total length.

== Habitat and conservation ==
The species has been found in black mud near rivers and agricultural areas (e.g., rice paddies). There are no known major threats affecting this ecologically poorly known species. Because it occurs in cultivated areas it is likely able to tolerate disturbance.
