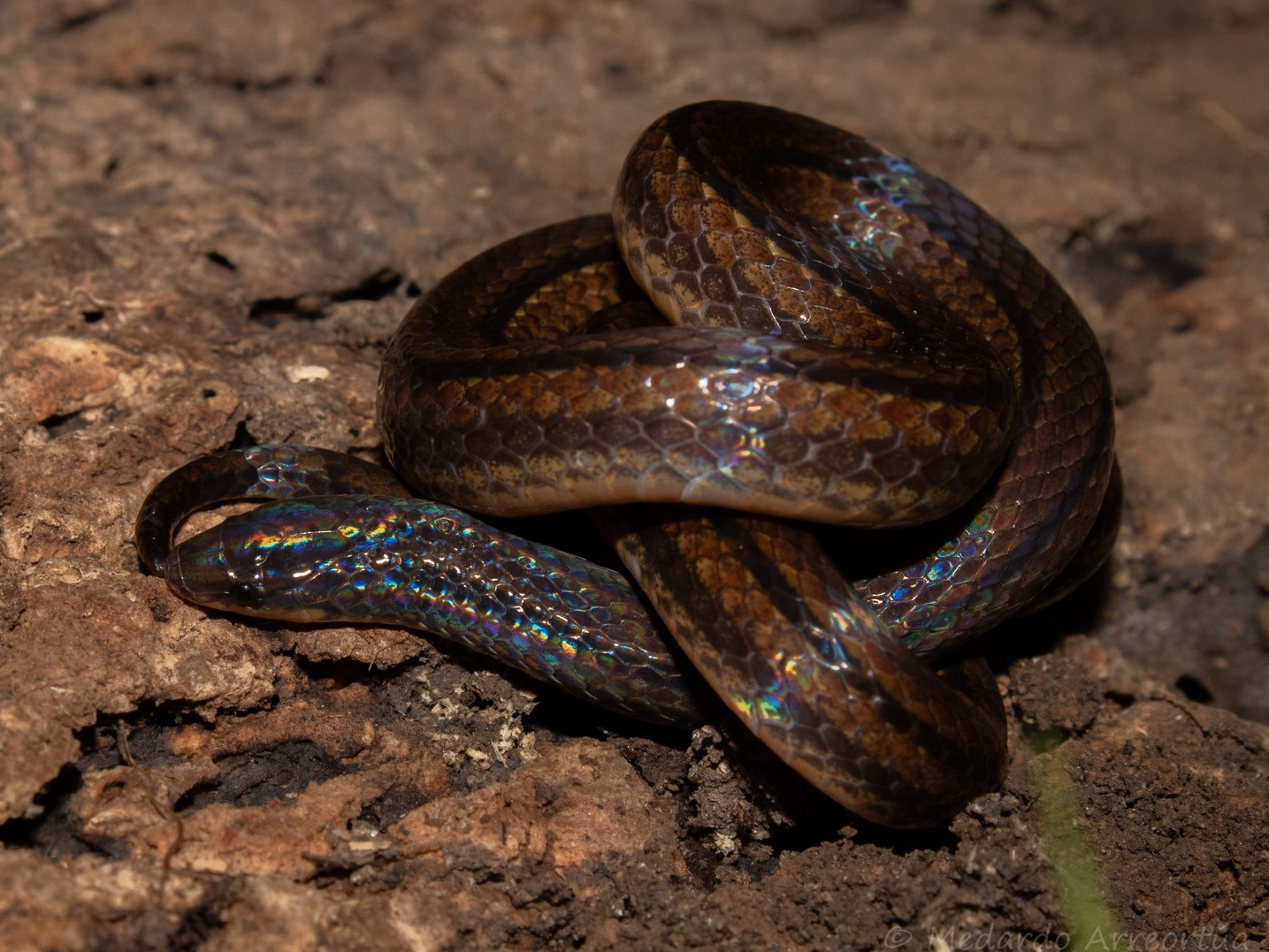

Conservation status
- Least Concern (IUCN 3.1)

Scientific classification
- Kingdom: Animalia
- Phylum: Chordata
- Class: Reptilia
- Order: Squamata
- Suborder: Serpentes
- Family: Colubridae
- Genus: Adelphicos
- Species: A. visoninum

Binomial name
- Adelphicos visoninum (Cope, 1866)

= Adelphicos visoninum =

Species of snake

Adelphicos visoninum, the Middle American burrowing snake, is a species of colubrid snake found in Mexico and Guatemala.
