= Stuart's burrowing snake =

Conservation status
- Vulnerable (IUCN 3.1)

Scientific classification
- Kingdom: Animalia
- Phylum: Chordata
- Class: Reptilia
- Order: Squamata
- Suborder: Serpentes
- Family: Colubridae
- Genus: Adelphicos
- Species: A. veraepacis

Binomial name
- Adelphicos veraepacis L.C. Stuart, 1941

Species of snake

Stuart's burrowing snake (Adelphicos veraepacis) is a species of colubrid snake. It is endemic to the Guatemala, where it can be found in pine-oak and cloud forests on Sierra de las Minas, the Cuilco Mountains, Sierra de los Cuchumatanes and Sierra de Xucaneb, at elevations of 1,200–2,200 m. It is terrestrial, fossorial and mainly nocturnal. It is threatened by habitat loss from agriculture and the exportation of Chamaedaphne calyculata plants.
