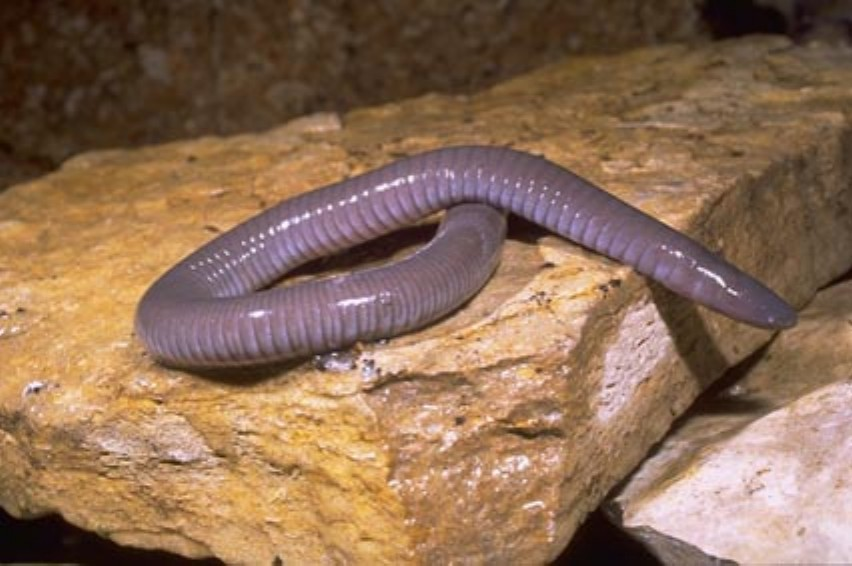
- Tapalcua (Dermophis mexicanus)

Scientific classification
- Kingdom: Animalia
- Phylum: Chordata
- Class: Amphibia
- Order: Gymnophiona
- Clade: Apoda
- Family: Dermophiidae
- Genus: Dermophis; Peters, 1880

Species
- 7, see text

= Dermophis =

Genus of amphibians

Dermophis is a genus of worm-like amphibians in the family Dermophiidae, the Neotropical and Tropical African caecilians. They are found in the Middle America between southern Mexico and northwestern Colombia. Common names Mexican caecilians or Neotropical caecilians are sometimes used for them.

== Species ==
The genus has seven species:

Binomial Name and Author	Common Name
Dermophis costaricense Taylor, 1955
Dermophis glandulosus Taylor, 1955
Dermophis gracilior Günther, 1902
Dermophis mexicanus (Duméril & Bibron, 1841)	Mexican caecilian, tapalcua
Dermophis oaxacae (Mertens, 1930)	Oaxacan caecilian
Dermophis occidentalis Taylor, 1955
Dermophis parviceps (Dunn, 1924)	La Loma caecilian, slender caecilian

== Description ==
The largest species, Dermophis mexicanus, can grow to a total length of 60 cm (24 in), while the smallest one, Dermophis parviceps, reaches only 11 cm (4 in). The body has numerous folds, from 97 to 258, with considerable variations both between individuals within a species and between the species. There is a tentacle about halfway between eye and nostril. The lower jaw has only one row of teeth. Living specimens are very dark purple to purple-black above and creamy white below.

Based on external morphology, three groups of species can be recognized:

1. large caecilians with numerous secondary folds: D. mexicanus and D. oaxacae
2. moderate-sized caecilians with numerous secondary folds: D. costaricense, D. glandulosus, D. gracilior
3. small to moderate-sized caecilians with few secondary folds: D. occidentalis, D. parviceps
