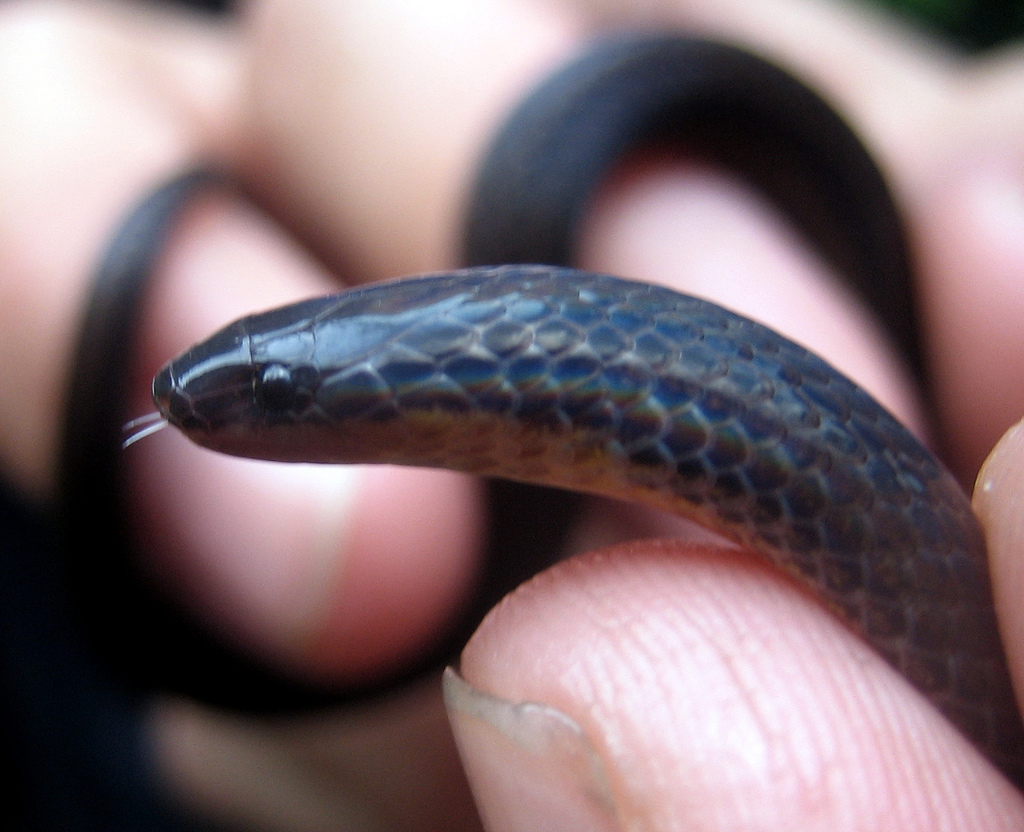

Conservation status
- Least Concern (IUCN 3.1)

Scientific classification
- Kingdom: Animalia
- Phylum: Chordata
- Class: Reptilia
- Order: Squamata
- Suborder: Serpentes
- Family: Colubridae
- Genus: Adelphicos
- Species: A. quadrivirgatum

Binomial name
- Adelphicos quadrivirgatum Jan, 1862

Synonyms
- Adelphicos quadrivirgatum Jan, 1862; Adelphicus [sic] quadrivirgatus — Cope, 1877; Atractus quadrivirgatus — Boulenger, 1894; Adelphicos quadrivirgatus — Liner, 1994; Adelphicos quadrivirgatum — McCranie & Castañeda, 2005

= Adelphicos quadrivirgatum =

Species of snake

Adelphicos quadrivirgatum, also known commonly as the Middle American burrowing snake and la zacatera de Jan in New World Spanish, is a species of snake in the subfamily Dipsadinae of the family Colubridae. The species is native to Mexico and Central America.

== Geographic range ==
Adelphicos quadrivirgatum is found in Belize, Guatemala, Honduras, Nicaragua, and Mexico; in Mexico, its range extends southward from the Mexican states of Nuevo León and Tamaulipas to San Luis Potosí, Veracruz, Querétaro, Hidalgo, Puebla, Oaxaca, and Chiapas.

== Habitat ==
Adelphicos quadrivirgatum inhabits tropical and subtropical wet and moist forest at elevations from sea level to 1,740 m (5,710 ft).

== Behavior ==
Adelphicos quadrivirgatus is terrestrial, and it is often found beneath logs.

== Description ==
Adelphicos quadrivirgatum is a small snake. Adult females may attain a total length of 36.5 cm (14.4 in), which includes a tail 5.5 cm (2.2 in) long. Dorsally, it is pale reddish brown, with four or five blackish narrow stripes. Ventrally, it is whitish with a brown stripe along the middle of the tail.

== Diet ==
Adelphicos quadrivirgatum preys mainly on earthworms.

== Reproduction ==
Adelphicos quadrivirgatum is oviparous.
