= Las Cruces Biological Station =

The Las Cruces Biological Station / Wilson Botanical Garden is located in the southern Puntarenas province of Costa Rica, and is the newest of the three research stations operated by the Organization for Tropical Studies (OTS). Las Cruces includes a biological research station, tourist facilities, and the botanical gardens started by Robert and Catherine Wilson, and bequeathed to OTS.

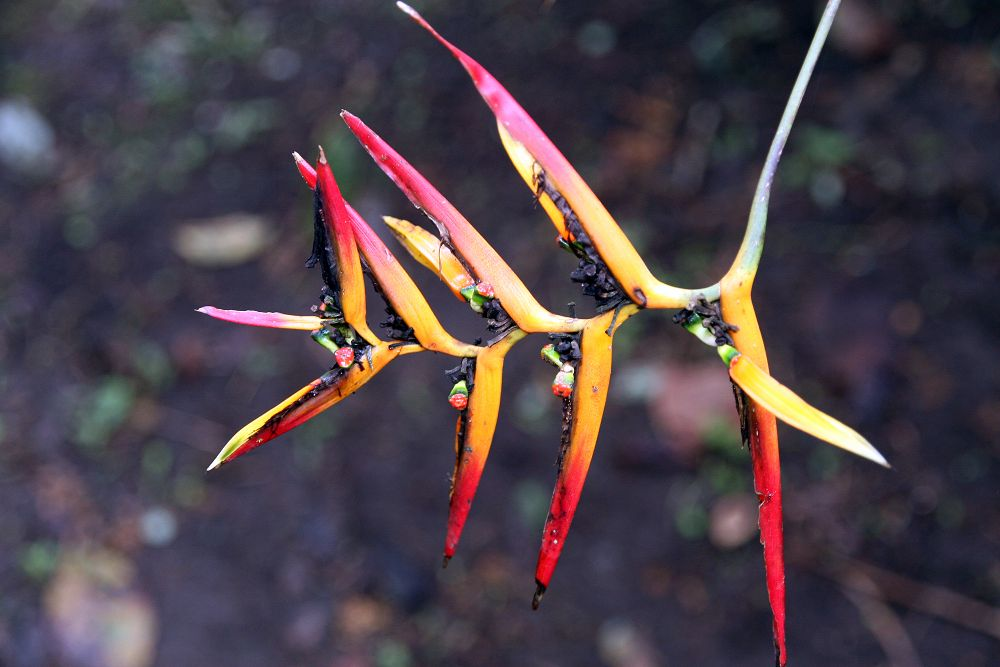
A Heliconia hirsuta in the botanical garden of the station

Las Cruces is located in a mountainous region at an elevation of approximately 1,000 meters above sea level (m.a.s.l.). Surrounded mostly by pastures, coffee plantations and other agricultural areas, Las Cruces includes a relatively small 270 Ha forest fragment that ranges from 900–1300 m.a.s.l. As such, much of the research conducted here focuses on agroecology or studies of forest fragmentation.
