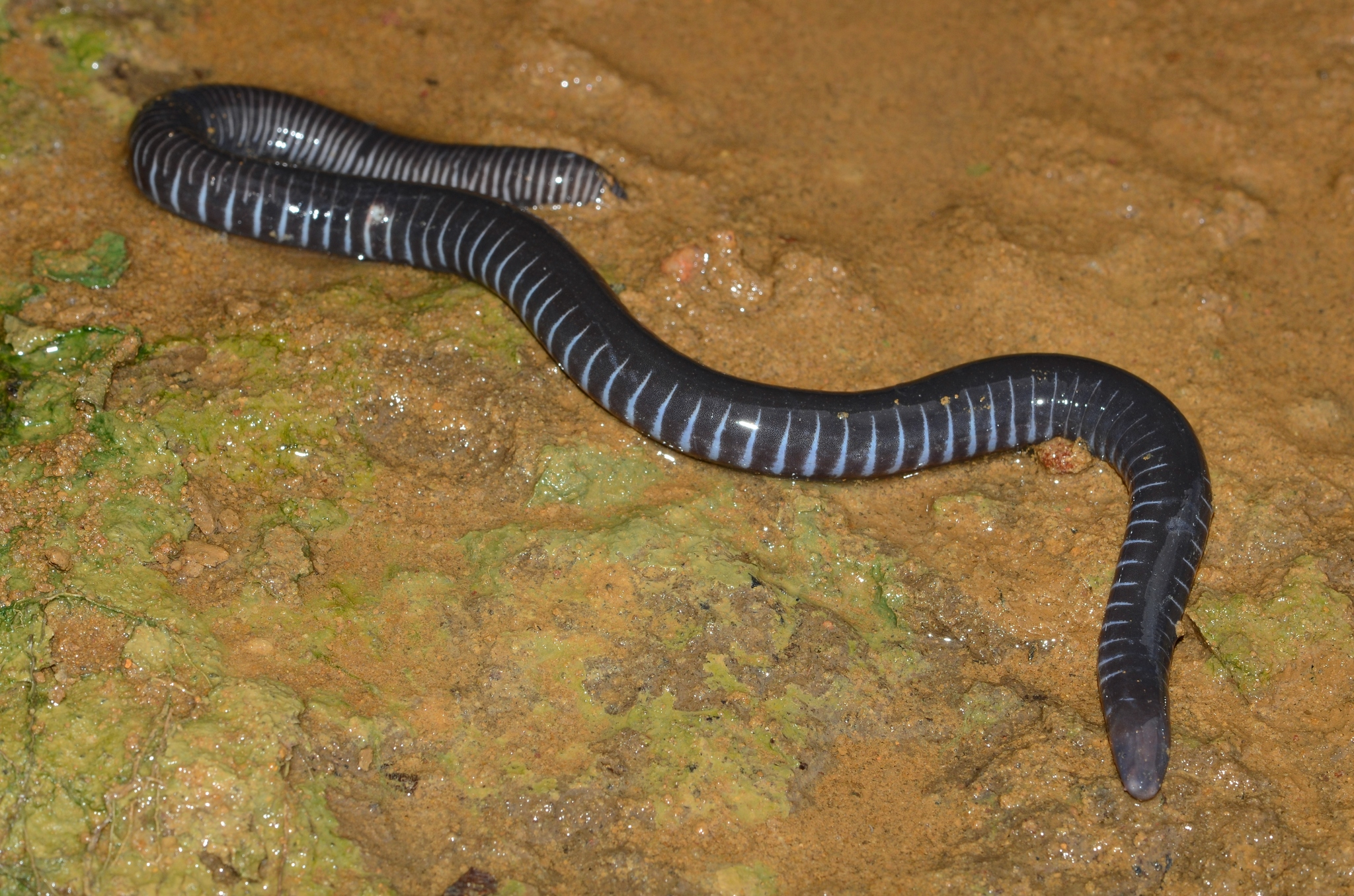

Conservation status
- Least Concern (IUCN 3.1)

Scientific classification
- Kingdom: Animalia
- Phylum: Chordata
- Class: Amphibia
- Order: Gymnophiona
- Clade: Apoda
- Family: Dermophiidae
- Genus: Geotrypetes
- Species: G. seraphini

Binomial name
- Geotrypetes seraphini (Dumeril, 1859)

= Geotrypetes seraphini =

Species of amphibian

Geotrypetes seraphini, the Gaboon caecilian, is a species of amphibian in the family Dermophiidae. It is found in Cameroon, Democratic Republic of the Congo, Ivory Coast, Equatorial Guinea, Gabon, Ghana, Guinea, Liberia, Nigeria, Sierra Leone, and possibly Angola, and the Republic of the Congo. Its natural habitats are subtropical or tropical moist lowland forests, plantations, rural gardens, urban areas, heavily degraded former forests, and seasonally flooded agricultural land.
