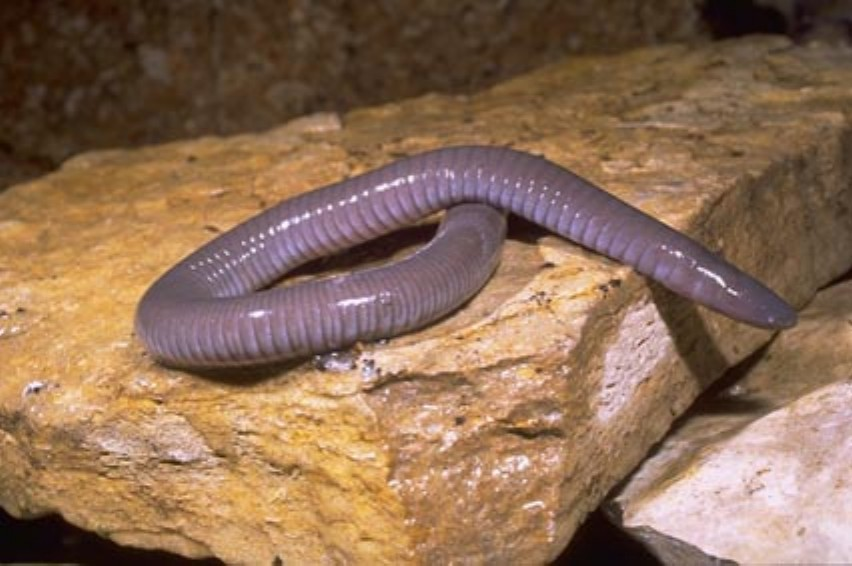

Conservation status
- Least Concern (IUCN 3.1)

Scientific classification
- Kingdom: Animalia
- Phylum: Chordata
- Class: Amphibia
- Order: Gymnophiona
- Clade: Apoda
- Family: Dermophiidae
- Genus: Dermophis
- Species: D. mexicanus

Binomial name
- Dermophis mexicanus (A.M.C. Duméril & Bibron, 1841)

Synonyms
- Siphonops mexicanus A.M.C. Duméril & Bibron, 1841; Amphisbaena versatilis Gray, 1850; Dermophis mexicanus — W. Peters, 1880; Gymnophis clarki Dunn, 1928; Dermophis eburatus Taylor, 1968; Dermophis septentrionalis Taylor, 1968; Gymnophis mexicanus — Dubois, Ohler & Pyron, 2021

= Dermophis mexicanus =

Species of amphibian

Dermophis mexicanus, also known commonly as the Mexican burrowing caecilian, the Mexican caecilian, and locally as the tapalcua or tepelcua, is a species of limbless amphibian in the family Dermophiidae. The species is native to Mexico and Central America, where it burrows under leaf litter and plant debris.

== Description ==
The adult Mexican burrowing caecilian grows to a total length (tail included) of 30 to 50 cm (12 to 20 in). In general appearance, it resembles a large earthworm. Around a hundred transverse annular folds in the skin give the appearance of segments. The head has a pointed snout, a single row of teeth in the lower jaw, and two vestigial eyes covered with skin, with a pair of protrusible tentacles between the eyes and the nostrils. The body is elongated and there are no limbs. The upper surface is dark grey and the under surface pale grey with darker markings on the annuli.

== Distribution and habitat ==
The Mexican burrowing caecilian is found in Mexico, Guatemala, El Salvador, Honduras, Nicaragua, and possibly Belize, mostly on the Atlantic side, but also in some isolated parts of the Pacific slope. Its natural habitats are subtropical or tropical dry forests, moist lowland forests, moist montane forests, plantations, rural gardens, and heavily degraded former forests. It is fossorial, living in damp, loose soil and under leaf litter, logs, and plant debris, often in banana and coffee plantations. It is found at altitudes of up to 1,200 m (3,900 ft) above sea level.

== Biology ==
The Mexican burrowing caecilian preys on invertebrates, including earthworms, termites, crickets, slugs, and snails. It emerges onto the ground surface on nights with light rainfall and catches small prey that come within its reach. Larger individuals may eat mice and small lizards. It moves by internal concertina-like movements and by undulating its body from side to side.

This caecilian is viviparous. Males start spermatogenesis at 1 years of age but may not reproduce until year two due to a greater abundance of spermatogenic lobules. Females can start reproducing after 1 year, but most reproduce in their second year. Fertilisation is internal and up to 16 developing larvae subsist on the yolks of their eggs for three months. Then, they develop rasping teeth and feed on maternal glandular secretions, scraping the inside of the oviduct to stimulate their production. When the young emerge, after 11 months of gestation, they are 10 to 15 cm (3.9 to 5.9 in) long. They then shed their larval teeth and rapidly grow a set of adult ones.

== Status ==
The Mexican burrowing caecilian is listed as least concern in the IUCN Red List of Threatened Species. It has several disjunct populations, and in areas where it used to be abundant it now seems to be less common, and the locations in which it is found seem to be fewer in number. It may be persecuted in some locations because it superficially looks like a snake.
