= FAM89A =

Human protein and gene

Identifiers
- Aliases: FAM89A, C1orf153, family with sequence similarity 89 member A
- External IDs: MGI: 1916877; GeneCards: FAM89A

Gene location (Human)
Chr.	Chromosome 1 (human)
Band	1q42.2	Start	231,018,958 bp
Band	1q42.2	End	231,040,254 bp

Gene location (Mouse)
Chr.	Chromosome 8 (mouse)
Band	8|8 E2	Start	125,466,996 bp
Band	8|8 E2	End	125,478,571 bp
RNA expression pattern
Bgee	Human / Mouse (ortholog); Top expressed in: placenta; subcutaneous adipose tissue; right lung; substantia nigra; skin of leg; hypothalamus; C1 segment; skin of abdomen; left adrenal gland; left adrenal cortex / Top expressed in: lumbar spinal ganglion; lens; epithelium of lens; lip; trigeminal ganglion; skin of external ear; esophagus; superior cervical ganglion; embryo; decidua; More reference expression data
BioGPS	n/a
Orthologs
Databases	NCBI: entry; OMA: entry
Species	Human	Mouse
Entrez	375061	69627
Ensembl	ENSG00000182118	ENSMUSG00000043068
UniProt	Q96GI7	Q14BJ1
RefSeq (mRNA)	NM_198552	NM_001081120
RefSeq (protein)	NP_940954	NP_001074589
Location (UCSC)	Chr 1: 231.02 – 231.04 Mb	Chr 8: 125.47 – 125.48 Mb
PubMed search
- Wikidata
View/Edit Human	View/Edit Mouse

Protein FAM89A (family with sequence similarity 89, member A) is a protein which in humans is encoded by the FAM89A gene. It is also known as chromosome 1 open reading frame 153 (C1orf153). Highest FAM89A gene expression is observed in the placenta and adipose tissue. Though its function is largely unknown, FAM89A is found to be differentially expressed in response to interleukin exposure, and it is implicated in immune responses pathways and various pathologies such as atherosclerosis and glioma cell expression.

== Gene ==
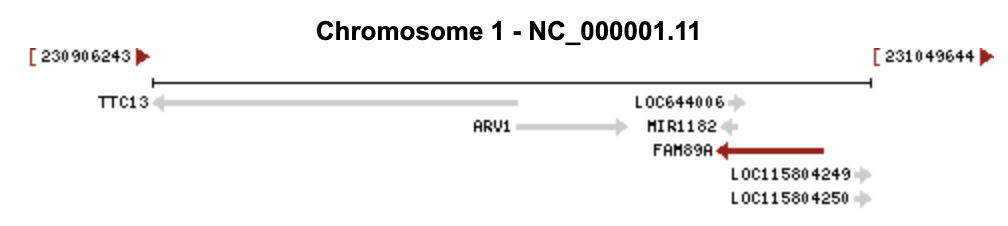
FAM89A located downstream of the ARV1 gene.

The gene FAM89A is a protein-encoding gene in humans, located on minus strand of chromosome 1, map position 1q42.2. It is also known as chromosome 1 open reading frame 153 (C1orf153). The primary mRNA transcript for the FAM89A gene is 1,503 base pairs in length. There are no other transcript variants for FAM89A. The gene is composed of two exons flanking one large intronic region. FAM89A is neighboring the genes TRIM67 (Tripartite Motif Containing 67), located downstream of FAM89A on the plus strand of chromosome 1, and ARV1 (ARV1 Homolog, Fatty Acid Homeostasis Modulator), located upstream of FAM89A on the plus strand of chromosome 1.

== Protein ==
=== Biochemistry ===
The FAM89A protein is 184 amino acids in length, and it has a predicted molecular mass of 18.6kDa and a predicted isoelectric point of 5.64. Two small repetitive sequences were found twice within the protein sequence; GARAA and ASGG. Composition of FAM89A protein is notable for its abundance of four amino acids; Leucine (14.1%), Glycine (12.0%), Alanine (11.4%) and Serine (11.4%). FAM89A shows five periodic repeats of leucine residues at every seventh amino acid position at positions 81-115, which is characteristic of its predicted leucine zipper structural motif.

=== Conserved Domains ===
FAM89A contains a conserved leucine-rich adapter protein domain (LURAP) called PF14854, located at amino acid positions 84-122. The LURAP superfamily of proteins are activators of the canonical NF-κB pathway, involved in promoting antigen presentation in dendritic cells and the production of pro-inflammatory cytokines.

=== Secondary Structure ===
FAM89A is predicted to be 40% alpha helix, 11% extended strand, and 49% random coils. The conserved LURAP domain is predicted to form an alpha helix.

=== Tertiary Structure ===
FAM89A tertiary structure has not yet been determined by X-ray crystallography. I-TASSER software predicts dimerization of alpha helix monomers, indicative of the leucine zipper motif.

== Gene Level Regulation ==
=== Promoter ===
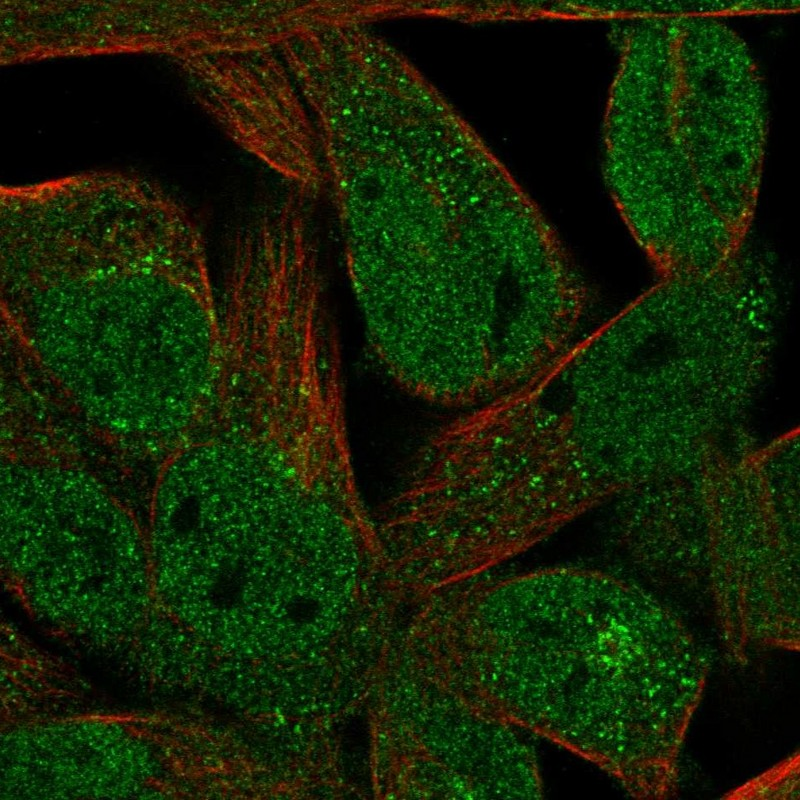
Immunofluorescent staining of RH-30 cell line reveals FAM89A localization to Golgi apparatus, vesicles, and nucleoplasm (shown in green).

The FAM89A promoter region is 1,104 base pairs in length. It contains binding sites for various transcription factors, including TFIIB (RNA polymerase II transcription factor IIB), PLAG1 (pleomorphic adenoma gene 1), MZF1 (myeloid zinc finger 1 factors), and SP1 (GC-Box factors SP1/GC).

=== Expression pattern ===
FAM89A's highest expression is observed in the placenta and adipose tissue. RNA-sequencing data also reveals moderate FAM89A expression in the adrenal gland, lung, skin, spleen, and breast. Microarray hybridization supports high FAM89A expression in the placenta and moderate expression in the lung, spinal cord, skin, adrenal gland, and retina.

== Protein Level Regulation ==
=== Subcellular Localization ===
The FAM89A protein is suggested to be localized in the nucleoplasm, Golgi apparatus, and/or vesicles. Reinhardt’s method for cytoplasmic/nuclear discrimination in PSORT II search results predict nuclear localization with a reliability score of 89. Prediction for localization of FAM89A is highest in the nucleus (52.2%) followed by the mitochondria (34.8%), then the cytoskeleton (8.7%), followed by the cytoplasm having the lowest score (4.3%). PredictProtein tool supports the prediction of subcellular localization in the nucleus.

=== Post-translational Modifications ===
==== Phosphorylation/O-Linked β-N-acetylglucosamine ====
FAM89A has three predicted phosphorylation sites located at amino acid positions 30, 32, and 168 that are conserved in distant orthologs. The predicted phosphorylation site at position 32 is experimentally verified at position 28 in its paralog, FAM89B. There is a possible competitive binding site for phosphorylation and O-linked β-N-acetylglucosamine (O-GlcNAc) at position 158, supporting localization of FAM89A in the nucleoplasm.

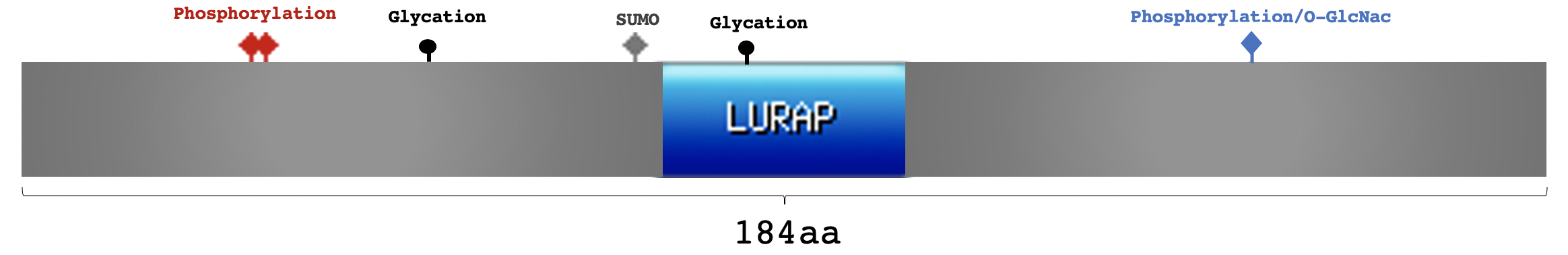
Schematic diagram of FAM89A 184 amino acid (aa) length protein with annotations of the leucine-rich adaptor protein (LURAP) domain and the post-translational modifications.

==== Glycation ====
NetGlycate 1.0 server predicts two glycation sites at positions 57 and 95. The residues are conserved in distant FAM89A orthologs. Glycation of these lysines is linked to being an important factor in atherosclerosis due to its production of advanced glycation end products (AGEs) which are engulfed by macrophages and taken into the arterial wall.

==== SUMOylation ====
SUMOplot predicts SUMO (Small Ubiquitin-like Modifier) protein sites at position 83. The residue is conserved in distant FAM89A orthologs.

== Homology/Evolution ==
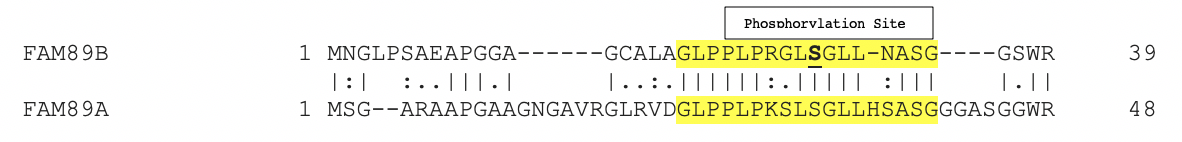
Pairwise sequence alignment of FAM89A to its paralog, FAM89A, reveals an unidentified conserved region containing experimentally verified FAM89B phosphorylation site.

=== Paralogs ===
An important human paralog of FAM89A is FAM89B, located on human chromosome 11 at map position 11q13.1. FAM89B is also known as, Leucine Repeat Adaptor Protein 25 (LRAP25) and Mammary Tumor Virus Receptor Homolog 1 (MTVR1). Orthologs of FAM89A, but not FAM89B, are present in bivalves, crinoids, hemichordates, starfish, and horseshoe crabs. Orthologs of FAM89B, but not FAM89A, are present in brachiopods and priapulids, The paralogs likely split around 736 million years ago.

=== Orthologs ===
FAM89A is largely conserved in Eutelostomi (bony vertebrates). Its orthologs can be found in mammals, amphibians, reptiles, birds, fish, and various insects. Distant FAM89A orthologs are present in octopus, scallop, ants, and bees.

Fam89A Orthologs
Genus and species	Common name	Taxonomic group (Order)	Median Date of Divergence from Human Lineage (MYA)	Accession #	Sequence Identity (%)
Homo sapiens	Human	Primates	-	NP_940954	-
Rattus norvegicus	Brown Rat	Rodentia	89	NP_001011711	79.3%
Acinonyx jubatus	Cheetah	Carnivora	94	XP_026902687	92.9%
Felis catus	Cat	Carnivora	94	XP_023096185	92.4%
Canis lupus dingo	Dingo	Carnivora	94	XP_025304333	91.3%
Neomonachus schauinslandi	Hawaiian Monk Seal	Carnivora	94	XP_021551830	90.8%
Physeter catodon	Sperm Whale	Even-toed ungulates	94	XP_023972851	90.2%
Bubalus bubalis	Water Buffalo	Even-toed ungulates	94	XP_006055609	88.6%
Rousettus aegyptiacus	Egyptian Fruit Bat	Chiroptera	94	XP_016018927	75.5%
Nothoprocta perdicaria	Chilean Tinamou	Tinamiformes	318	XP_025909144	61.1%
Gekko japonicus	Schlegel's Japanese gecko	Squamata	318	XP_015284726.1	49.8%
Xenopus laevis	African Clawed Frog	Anura	351.7	NP_001121297	65.6%
Microcaecilia unicolor	Tiny Cayenne Caecilian	Gymnophiona	351.7	XP_030051069	63.6%
Scleropages formosus	Asian Arowana	Osteoglossiformes	433	XP_018597917	52.6%
Callorhincus milii	Australian Ghostshark	Chimaeriformes	465	XP_007893339	54.5%
Acanthaster planci	Crown-of-thorns Starfish	Valvatida	627	XP_022103224	30.8%
Branchiostoma belcheri	Lancelet	Amphioxiformes	637	XP_019630993.1	27.1%
Parasteatoda tepidariorum	Common House Spider	Araneae	736	XP_015922370	32.8%
Mizuhopecten yessoensis	Scallop	Pectinida	736	XP_021378459	22.0%
Octopus vulgaris	Common Octopus	Octopoda	736	XP_029642735	19.2%
Cyphomyrmex costatus	Fungus-growing ant	Hymenoptera	736	KYN04870.1	10.9%
Eufriesea mexicana	Orchid Bee	Hymenoptera	736	OAD57070	10.5%

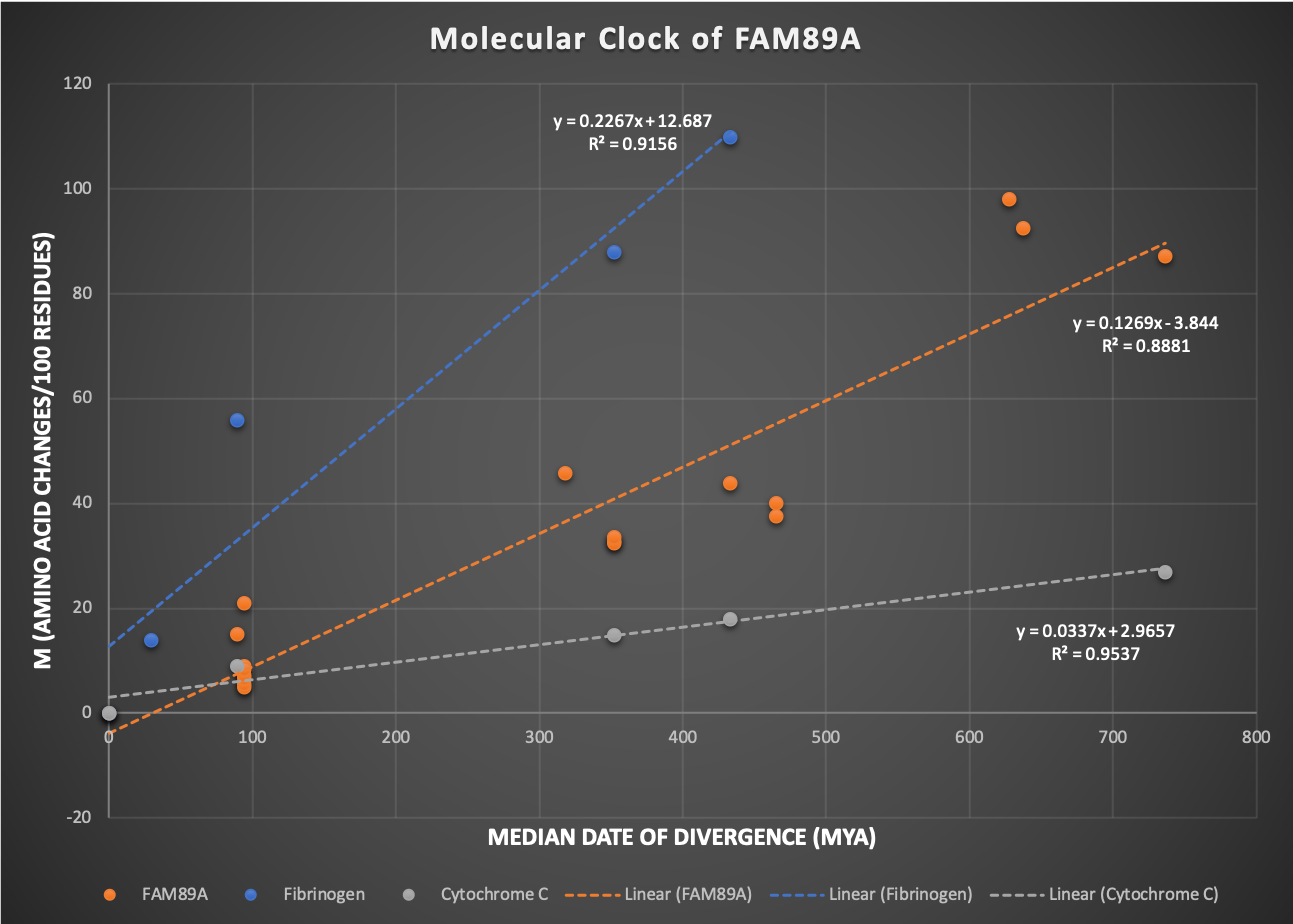
Relative divergence of FAM89A reveals FAM89A's rapid rate of mutation accumulation relative to fibrinogen, a gene that is evolving rapidly, and cytochrome c, a gene that is evolving slowly.

=== Evolution ===
The rate of accumulation of amino acid changes relative to the genes Fibrinogen and Cytochrome c indicates that FAM89A is evolving rapidly, using the molecular clock technique.

== Interacting Proteins ==
FAM89A is experimentally determined to interact with the UBXN2B (UBX Domain Protein 2B), an adaptor protein involved in biogenesis in the Golgi apparatus and endoplasmic reticulum (ER) and assembly and maintenance of the ER during the cell cycle

== Clinical Significance ==
=== Pathology and Disease Association ===
FAM89A is suggested to be involved in modulating the effects of smoking on the risk of atherosclerotic plaque burden. In a study conducted in 2014, a cohort of 264 Caribbean Hispanics with varying smoking frequencies were evaluated for carotid plaque burden and 11 single nucleotide polymorphism (SNP) were identified that had a notable interaction with smoking effects on carotid plaque burden, including SNP rs6700792, located within the FAM89A gene.

FAM89A is also suggested to be involved in discriminating viral and bacterial infection in febrile patients. A 2016 study conducted at the Division of Infectious Disease in the Imperial College of London evaluated blood-based transcriptomic biomarkers and revealed that febrile patients with bacterial infection displayed increased expression of FAM89A.

A 2019 study concerning FAM89A was directed on genes that possess methylation sites that relate to causing gliomas. The researchers found that abnormal expression of FAM89A correlated with glioma gene expression profiling studies.

Microarray hybridization data revealed slight decrease in FAM89A expression in response to airway epithelial cell exposure to interleukin 13 and CD8+ T lymphocyte exposure to interleukin 10.
