= Anolis dominicensis =

Scientific classification
- Kingdom: Animalia
- Phylum: Chordata
- Class: Reptilia
- Order: Squamata
- Suborder: Iguania
- Family: Dactyloidae
- Genus: Anolis
- Species: A. dominicensis

Binomial name
- Anolis dominicensis Reinhardt & Lütken, 1862

Species of lizard

Anolis dominicensis is a species of lizard in the family Dactyloidae. The species is found in Hispaniola.
