= Brasilotyphlus braziliensis =

Conservation status
- Least Concern (IUCN 3.1)

Scientific classification
- Kingdom: Animalia
- Phylum: Chordata
- Class: Amphibia
- Order: Gymnophiona
- Clade: Apoda
- Family: Siphonopidae
- Genus: Brasilotyphlus
- Species: B. braziliensis

Binomial name
- Brasilotyphlus braziliensis (Dunn, 1945)

Species of amphibian

Brasilotyphlus braziliensis is a species of caecilian in the family Siphonopidae. It was considered monotypic within Brasilotyphlus but a recently described species (Brasilotyphlus guarantanus) has been placed in this same genus. It is endemic to Brazil. Its habitat includes natural forests, dry tropical or subtropical. It is in danger of extinction because of the loss of its natural habitat.
