= Mimosiphonops reinhardti =

Conservation status
- Data Deficient (IUCN 3.1)

Scientific classification
- Kingdom: Animalia
- Phylum: Chordata
- Class: Amphibia
- Order: Gymnophiona
- Clade: Apoda
- Family: Siphonopidae
- Genus: Mimosiphonops
- Species: M. reinhardti

Binomial name
- Mimosiphonops reinhardti Wilkinson and Nussbaum, 1992

Species of amphibian

Mimosiphonops reinhardti is a species of caecilian in the family Siphonopidae. It is endemic to Brazil. It is only known from the holotype collected from "Brasilia" in 1878, probably somewhere in eastern Brazil (the city of Brasília did not exist at the time). The specific name reinhardti honors Johannes Theodor Reinhardt, Danish zoologist and herpetologist who collected the holotype. Common name Reinhardt's caecilian has been proposed for this species.

== Description ==
The holotype is a male measuring 254 mm (10.0 in) in total length. It has 74 primary annuli and 83 vertebrae. The body is dorsoventrally compressed. The eyes are clearly visible through the skin. The preserved specimen has a pale lilac-grey ground color where the cuticular layer of the skin is intact and a darker brown where this layer is missing. There is a broad and diffuse white patch occupying much of the throat and ventral surface of the nuchal collars. A pair of white mandibular stripes is present.

== Habitat and conservation ==
There is no information on ecological requirements of this species. It might be similar to Siphonops annulatus and be an oviparous species with direct development (i.e, there is no free-living larval stage). Also threats to this species are unknown.
