= Brasilotyphlus =

Scientific classification
- Kingdom: Animalia
- Phylum: Chordata
- Class: Amphibia
- Order: Gymnophiona
- Clade: Apoda
- Family: Siphonopidae
- Genus: Brasilotyphlus; Taylor, 1968

Genus of amphibians

Brasilotyphlus is a genus of caecilians in the family Siphonopidae. It was considered monotypic, containing only the species Brasilotyphlus braziliensis. However, two recently described species, Brasilotyphlus guarantanus and Brasilotyphlus dubium, have been placed in this same genus. All three species are endemic to Brazil. This genus has also been suggested as paraphyletic to Microcaecilia.

== Species ==
- Brasilotyphlus braziliensis
- Brasilotyphlus dubium
- Brasilotyphlus guarantanus

== History ==
The genus was discovered less than a century ago, and relatively little is known about it to date. The physical shape and structure of Brasilotyphlus has been recorded, while information concerning even basic biology, such as physiology and habitat, of this genus is lacking. Currently, it is known to be a subterranean genus living in the rainforest of Brazil. Further, the threats to this genus are currently unknown, as its ability to adapt to a secondary habitat has not been observed. Both species have been located exclusively in Brazil. Their known locations are small and restricted. They were found independent of each other, and their habitats may not overlap. The closest known habitats for the two species, with respect to each other, are approximately 950 km apart. Beyond this there is little to no knowledge as to the distribution of this genus, which makes locating a subject for research quite difficult. The first of these species, Brasilotyphlus braziliensis has not even been seen since 1997. Even the classification of this genus is a source of confusion, as not all scholars agree on the phylogeny. To date, no photographs have been published of the living Brasilotyphlus brasiliensis.

== Phylogeny ==
This genus has been strongly suggested to be put under taxonomic review. It was originally declared its own genus because of its distinct combination of characteristics. Namely, it had premaxillary teeth which did not extend to the level of the posterior nasal apertures. It had vomerine teeth which were organized in rows of compact semicircles and were separated from the palatine teeth by a gap. The eye was not visible externally, instead covered by thick bone. There were small tentacles which, in comparison to other caecillians of similar size, were much closer to the mouth. Lastly, the specimen has a weak vertical keel on the terminal part of the body. However, the finding of the second species, B. guarantanus, has redefined the genus characteristics. Now, the genus is described as diminutive caecilian, being no more than 305 mm in length.

== Cranial characteristics ==
The species B. guarantanus has been reported to have sexual dimorphism in the head. That is, the head of the male is wider than the head of the female. The genus Brasilotyphlus also has an open eye socket. The eye was originally thought to not be visible from the outside or not be present at all. One dissection concluded that the eyes were either too small to be seen by the naked eye, or not present. The bones of the skull are transparent, allowing the brain to be seen through them. The tentacular opening has a greater posterior distance from the nostril then that of other known Gymnophiona and is much closer to the mouth. Its tentacles are also relatively small. All specimens of B. brasiliensis have been flattened or otherwise damaged. Measurements are therefore estimated. Most of the data on this genus is taken from the species Brasilotyphlus guarantanus.

== Dentition ==
The genus Brasilotyphlus has a three-series dentition. The inner mandibular teeth are absent. The maxillary teeth can extend to or past the choanae, but do not always. It has a large diastema, or gap, between its vomerine and palatine teeth. It contains premaxillary, maxillary, prevomerine, and palatine teeth. Most teeth monocuspid. The prevomerine and palatine teeth are the only exceptions and they are bicuspid. The front end of the tongue is attached to the gums directly behind the dentary teeth.

== Scales ==
The genus Brasilotyphuls has dermal scales present in its folds. The scales are mostly present on the posterior end of the body. The species Brasilotyphlus braziliensis has scales which start around the 25th fold of the body. The scales start off very small. At the middle of the body there are two rows of scales. The remaining posterior end of the body has five rows of scales on each fold and they are irregularly organized. It has a brown coloration throughout.
