= Brasilotyphlus dubium =

Conservation status
- Least Concern (IUCN 3.1)

Scientific classification
- Kingdom: Animalia
- Phylum: Chordata
- Class: Amphibia
- Order: Gymnophiona
- Clade: Apoda
- Family: Siphonopidae
- Genus: Brasilotyphlus
- Species: B. dubium

Binomial name
- Brasilotyphlus dubium Correia, Nunes, Gamble, Marques-Souza, Fouquet, Rodrigues, & Mott, 2018

Species of amphibian

Brasilotyphlus dubium is a species of caecilian in the family Caeciliidae. It is endemic to the state of Roraima in northern Brazil. It was described in 2018.
