= Luetkenotyphlus brasiliensis =

Conservation status
- Data Deficient (IUCN 3.1)

Scientific classification
- Kingdom: Animalia
- Phylum: Chordata
- Class: Amphibia
- Order: Gymnophiona
- Clade: Apoda
- Family: Siphonopidae
- Genus: Luetkenotyphlus
- Species: L. brasiliensis

Binomial name
- Luetkenotyphlus brasiliensis (Lütken, 1851)

Synonyms
- Siphonops brasiliensis Lütken, 1851; Siphonops confusionis Taylor, 1968

Species of amphibian

Luetkenotyphlus brasiliensis, the São Paulo caecilian, is a species of caecilian in the family Siphonopidae. It is found in Misiones Province in northern Argentina and northwards to São Paulo state in Brazil; it likely occurs in adjacent Paraguay.

Luetkenotyphlus brasiliensis is a poorly known species. It probably inhabits forest, but it has also been found in urban gardens. This suggests that it is somewhat adaptable species.
