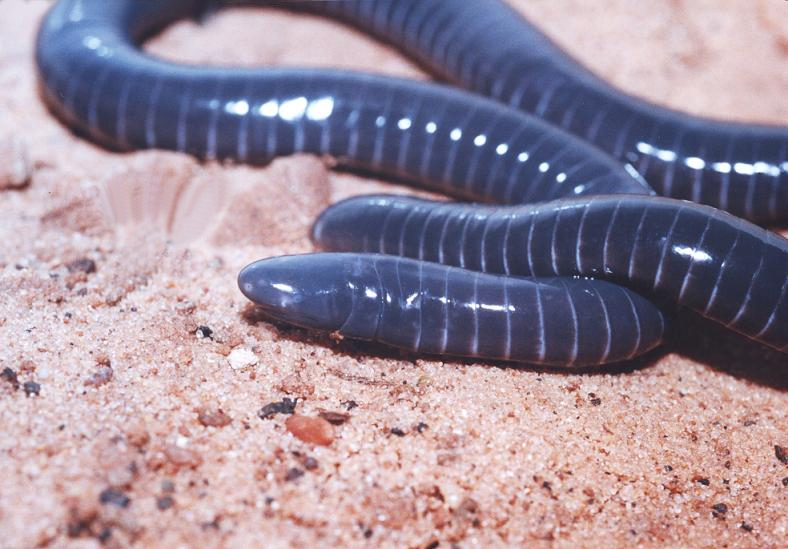

Conservation status
- Least Concern (IUCN 3.1)

Scientific classification
- Kingdom: Animalia
- Phylum: Chordata
- Class: Amphibia
- Order: Gymnophiona
- Clade: Apoda
- Family: Siphonopidae
- Genus: Siphonops
- Species: S. paulensis

Binomial name
- Siphonops paulensis Boettger, 1892

= Siphonops paulensis =

Species of amphibian

Siphonops paulensis, or Boettger's caecilian, is a species of caecilian in the family Siphonopidae. It is found in northern Argentina, Paraguay, eastern Bolivia, and southern Brazil. It lives subterraneously in forests, savannas, shrublands, and grassland. It also adapts to anthropogenic disturbance and can even live in urban gardens. In fact these caecilians have even been recorded to breed and raise their young close to Santa Cruz, a highly populated city. It is a locally common species that is not facing major threats.
