= Luetkenotyphlus =

Scientific classification
- Domain: Eukaryota
- Kingdom: Animalia
- Phylum: Chordata
- Class: Amphibia
- Order: Gymnophiona
- Clade: Apoda
- Family: Siphonopidae
- Genus: Luetkenotyphlus; Taylor, 1968

Genus of amphibians

Luetkenotyphlus is a genus of caecilians in the family Siphonopidae.

Species recognized (as of October 2019):

- Luetkenotyphlus brasiliensis (Lütken, 1851)
- Luetkenotyphlus fredi Maciel, Castro, Sturaro, Silva, Ferreira, Santos, Risse-Quaioto, Barboza, Oliveira, Sampaio, and Schneider, 2019
- Luetkenotyphlus insulanus (Ihering, 1911)
