= Microcaecilia taylori =

Conservation status
- Least Concern (IUCN 3.1)

Scientific classification
- Kingdom: Animalia
- Phylum: Chordata
- Class: Amphibia
- Order: Gymnophiona
- Clade: Apoda
- Family: Siphonopidae
- Genus: Microcaecilia
- Species: M. taylori

Binomial name
- Microcaecilia taylori Nussbaum and Hoogmoed, 1979

Species of amphibian

Microcaecilia taylori is a species of caecilian in the family Siphonopidae. It is known from two widely separated populations, one in southern Suriname and other one in Pará, Brazil, south of the Amazon River. It is not clear whether the gap is real or whether the populations south of the Amazon River represent a distinct species. Microcaecilia taylori was confused with Microcaecilia marvaleewakeae before the latter was described in 2013.

== Etymology ==
The specific name taylori honors Edward Harrison Taylor (1889–1978), an American herpetologist.

== Description ==
Microcaecilia taylori is a relatively small species reaching a total body length of 172 mm (6.8 in) and body width of 5 mm (0.20 in) in snout–vent length. There are 115–118 primary body rings. The eyes are invisible. The body color is purple with small, lighter spots. The ventral parts are transparent.

== Habitat and conservation ==
Its natural habitats are primary tropical rainforest and forest islands in the savanna. It is a subterranean species also found under logs. There are no known threats to this species that is found in areas of low human impact. It occurs in the Sipaliwani Nature Reserve.
