= Mimosiphonops =

Scientific classification
- Domain: Eukaryota
- Kingdom: Animalia
- Phylum: Chordata
- Class: Amphibia
- Order: Gymnophiona
- Clade: Apoda
- Family: Siphonopidae
- Genus: Mimosiphonops; Taylor, 1968

Type species
- Mimosiphonops vermiculatus Taylor, 1968

Synonyms
- Pseudosiphonops Taylor, 1968

Genus of amphibians

Mimosiphonops is a genus of caecilians in the family Siphonopidae. The genus is definitely known only from the state of Rio de Janeiro, Brazil. They are sometimes known as the worm patterned caecilians.

== Description ==
The genus is known from few specimens only; these measure between 186 and 290 mm (7.3 and 11.4 in) in total length. There are 83–98 vertebrae and 74–88 primary annuli, with the smallest value in both cases pertaining to Mimosiphonops reinhardti that is known from a single specimen. The eyes are not covered by bone. No scales nor secondary annuli are present. The primary annuli and nuchal collars and grooves are clearly marked with a white border.

== Species ==
There are two recognized species:

- Mimosiphonops reinhardti Wilkinson and Nussbaum, 1992
- Mimosiphonops vermiculatus Taylor, 1968
