= Microcaecilia grandis =

Scientific classification
- Kingdom: Animalia
- Phylum: Chordata
- Class: Amphibia
- Order: Gymnophiona
- Clade: Apoda
- Family: Siphonopidae
- Genus: Microcaecilia
- Species: M. grandis

Binomial name
- Microcaecilia grandis Wilkinson, Nussbaum & Hoogmoed, 2010

Species of amphibian

Microcaecilia grandis is a species of caecilian in the family Siphonopidae. It is endemic to Suriname and only known from the Lely Mountains. It measures around 318 mm (12.5 in) in total length, and possesses bicuspid vomeropalatine teeth as well as more than 20 premaxillary-maxillary teeth.
