= Microcaecilia iwokramae =

Conservation status
- Data Deficient (IUCN 3.1)

Scientific classification
- Kingdom: Animalia
- Phylum: Chordata
- Class: Amphibia
- Order: Gymnophiona
- Clade: Apoda
- Family: Siphonopidae
- Genus: Microcaecilia
- Species: M. iwokramae

Binomial name
- Microcaecilia iwokramae (Wake and Donnelly, 2010)

Synonyms
- Caecilita iwokramae Wake and Donnelly, 2010

Species of amphibian

Microcaecilia iwokramae is a species of caecilian in the family Siphonopidae. It is endemic to Guyana and only known from its type locality in the Iwokrama Forest. It was first described as Caecilita iwokramae in the monotypic genus Caecilita, before being recognised as belonging to Microcaecilia.

== Description ==
Microcaecilia iwokramae was first thought to be the second known species of lungless caecilian and first from a terrestrial habitat, the other lungless species being the aquatic Atretochoana eiselti. Microcaecilia iwokramae is small and terrestrial, and does have a lung. The holotype, found in Guyana, in the scrub of Iwokrama Forest, was 11.2 centimetres (4.4 in) in length, with 102 annuli. Its colour in life was not recorded, but in preservative it was light yellow-brown with mottling. Unlike previously reported, this species does have open external nares, and possesses a single, well-developed lung, and it is similar to other Microcaecilia in having an orbit mostly covered by bone (closed).

== Habitat and conservation ==
Microcaecilia iwokramae is known from mixed low-stature scrub forest at 1,000 m (3,300 ft) above sea level. It appears to be reasonably common in the vicinity of the type locality. Specimens could be found by digging soil, particularly under rotting wood or leaf litter or between the buttress roots of trees.
