= Siphonops hardyi =

Conservation status
- Least Concern (IUCN 3.1)

Scientific classification
- Kingdom: Animalia
- Phylum: Chordata
- Class: Amphibia
- Order: Gymnophiona
- Clade: Apoda
- Family: Siphonopidae
- Genus: Siphonops
- Species: S. hardyi

Binomial name
- Siphonops hardyi Boulenger, 1888

Species of amphibian

Siphonops hardyi, or Hardy's caecilian, is a species of caecilian in the family Siphonopidae. It is endemic to southeastern Brazil where it occurs in the states of São Paulo, Rio de Janeiro, Espírito Santo, and Minas Gerais, possibly wider. This species lives in soil and under leaf litter or stones in primary forest, plantations, and rural gardens. It is a common species; it can locally suffer from infrastructure development but is not generally threatened.
