= Luetkenotyphlus insulanus =

Conservation status
- Data Deficient (IUCN 3.1)

Scientific classification
- Kingdom: Animalia
- Phylum: Chordata
- Class: Amphibia
- Order: Gymnophiona
- Clade: Apoda
- Family: Siphonopidae
- Genus: Luetkenotyphlus
- Species: L. insulanus

Binomial name
- Luetkenotyphlus insulanus (R. von Ihering, 1911)

Synonyms
- Siphonops insulanus Ihering, 1911

Species of amphibian

Luetkenotyphlus insulanus, the insular caecilian, is a species of caecilian in the family Siphonopidae. It is endemic to the Ilhabela archipelago in Brazil. Its natural habitat is subtropical forests, where it lives in the soil.
