= Siphonops leucoderus =

Conservation status
- Data Deficient (IUCN 3.1)

Scientific classification
- Kingdom: Animalia
- Phylum: Chordata
- Class: Amphibia
- Order: Gymnophiona
- Clade: Apoda
- Family: Siphonopidae
- Genus: Siphonops
- Species: S. leucoderus

Binomial name
- Siphonops leucoderus Taylor, 1968

Species of amphibian

Siphonops leucoderus, the Salvador caecilian, is a species of caecilian in the family Siphonopidae. It is endemic to eastern Brazil and only known from its type locality, the Bahia state (more precise location is unknown). It is assumed to be a subterranean species, possibly living in lowland moist forest.
