= Microcaecilia rabei =

Conservation status
- Data Deficient (IUCN 3.1)

Scientific classification
- Kingdom: Animalia
- Phylum: Chordata
- Class: Amphibia
- Order: Gymnophiona
- Clade: Apoda
- Family: Siphonopidae
- Genus: Microcaecilia
- Species: M. rabei

Binomial name
- Microcaecilia rabei (Roze and Solano, 1963)

Synonyms
- Gymnopis rabei Roze and Solano, 1963

Species of amphibian

Microcaecilia rabei is a species of caecilian in the family Siphonopidae. It is known from Suriname and the Bolívar State in eastern Venezuela; it is likely to occur in intervening Guyana and adjacent Brazil.

Microcaecilia rabei is a subterranean species living in tropical moist environments, especially lowland rainforests. There are also records from secondary habitats. It is unlikely to be facing any significant threats, although mining could be a localized threat.
