= Microcaecilia supernumeraria =

Conservation status
- Data Deficient (IUCN 3.1)

Scientific classification
- Kingdom: Animalia
- Phylum: Chordata
- Class: Amphibia
- Order: Gymnophiona
- Clade: Apoda
- Family: Siphonopidae
- Genus: Microcaecilia
- Species: M. supernumeraria

Binomial name
- Microcaecilia supernumeraria Taylor, 1969

Species of amphibian

Microcaecilia supernumeraria is a species of amphibians in the family Siphonopidae. It is endemic to Brazil. Its natural habitats are subtropical or tropical moist lowland forests, plantations, rural gardens, and heavily degraded former forest.
