= Ilhabela =

- Municipality
- Municipality of Ilhabela
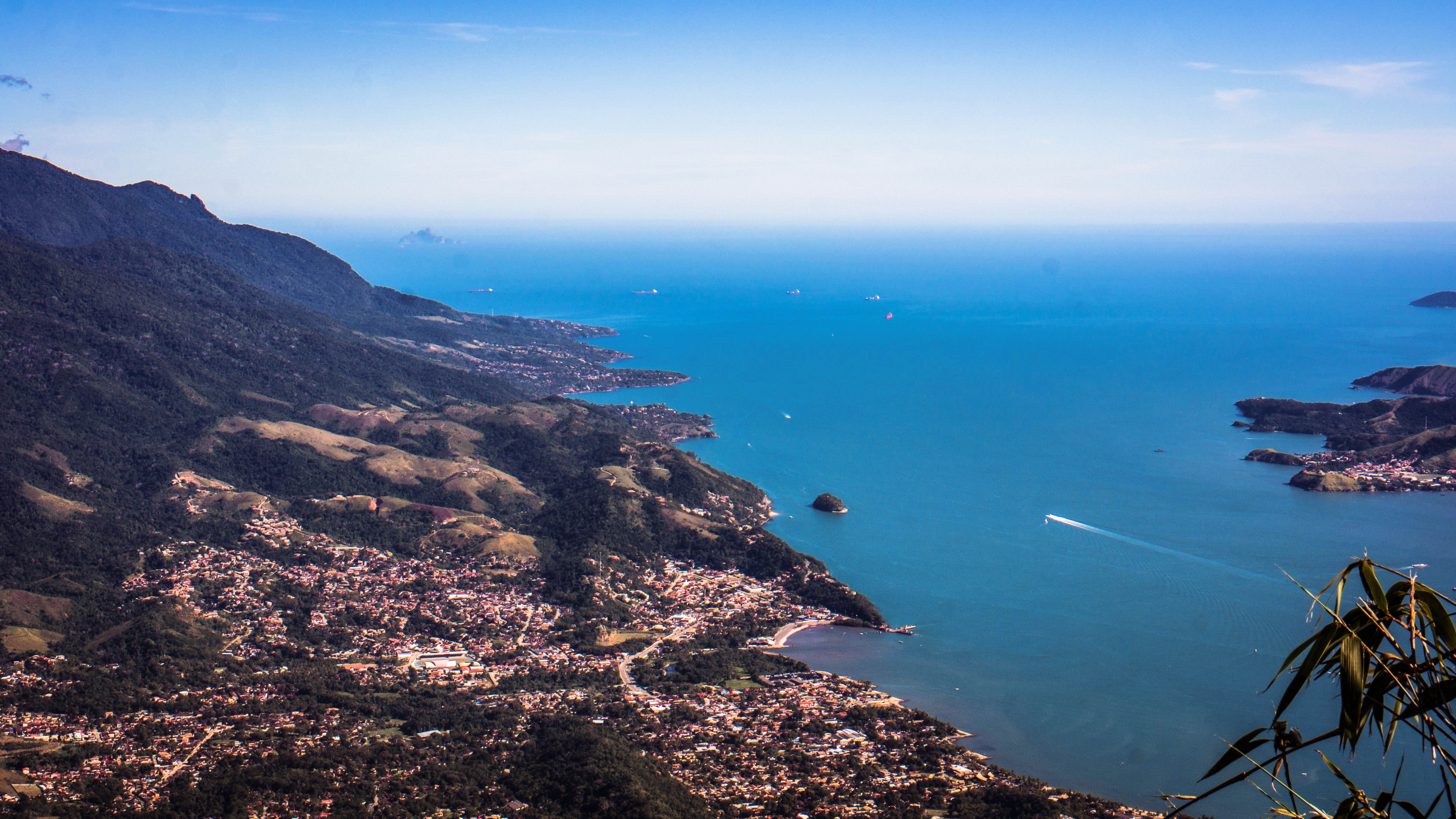
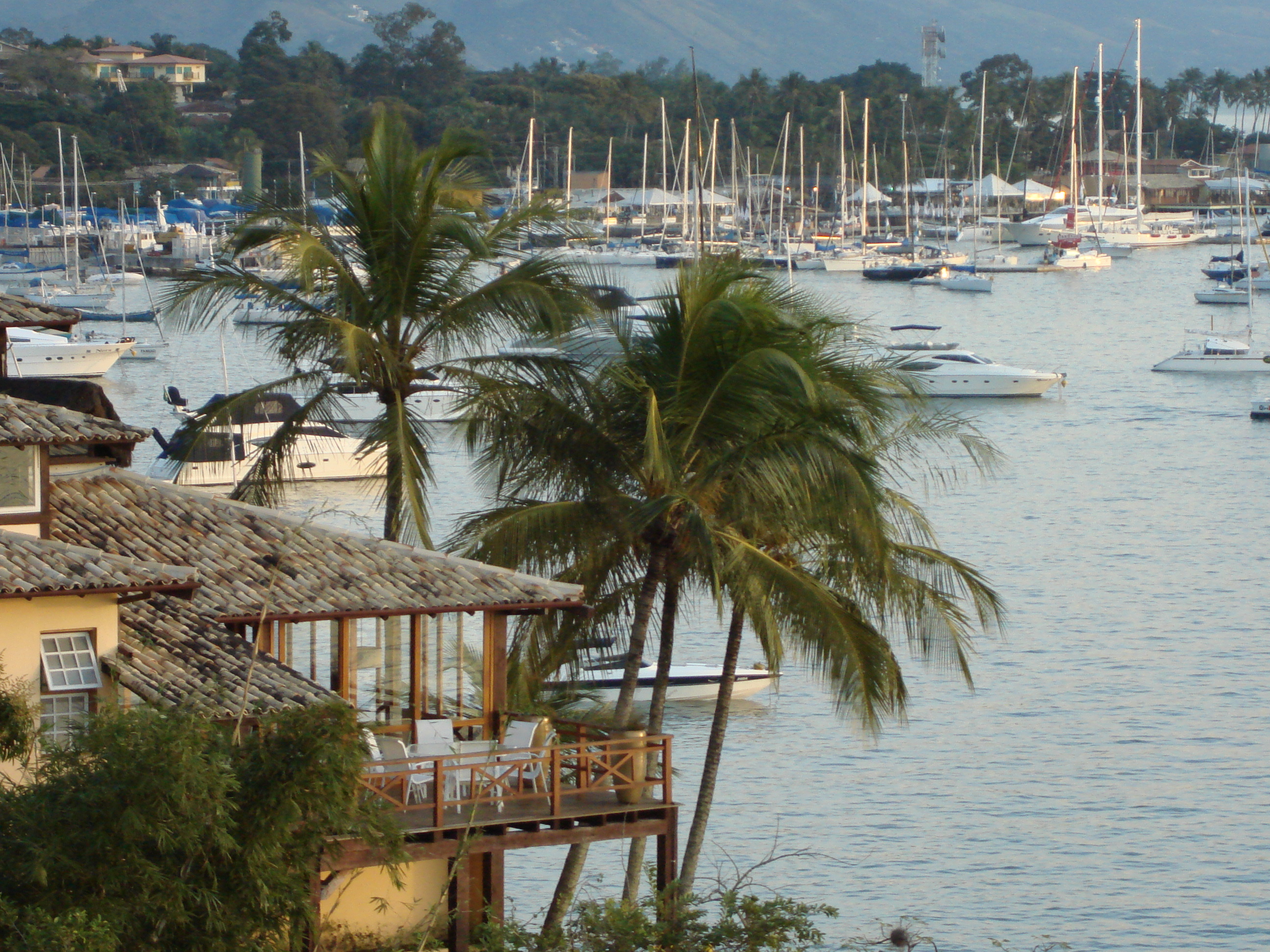
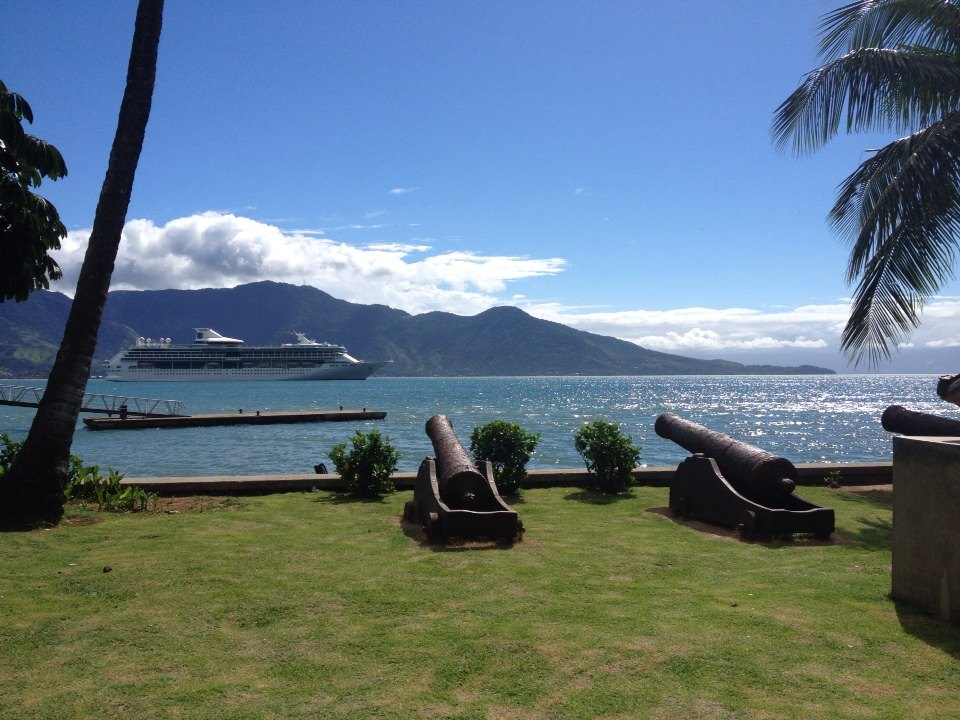
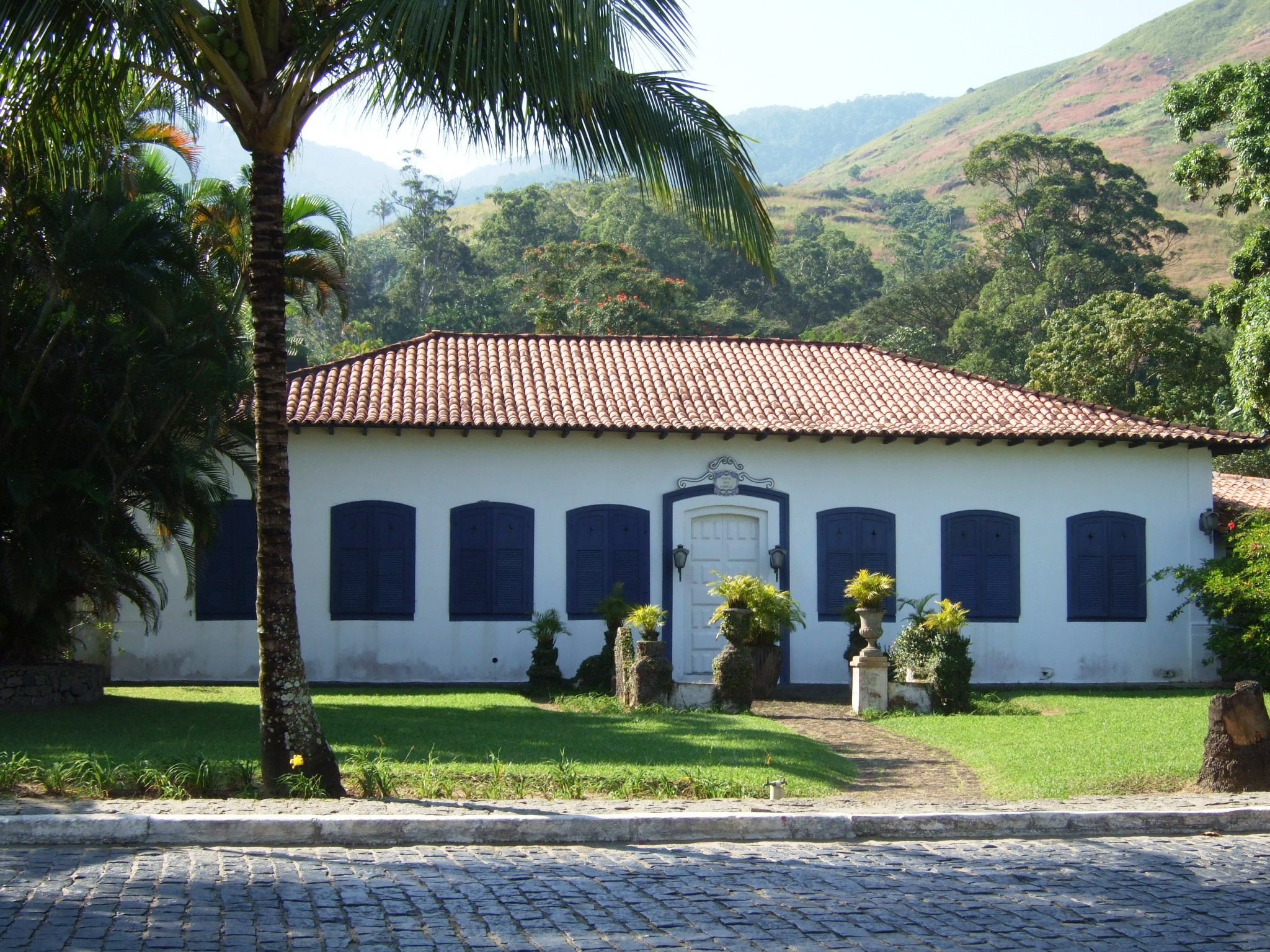
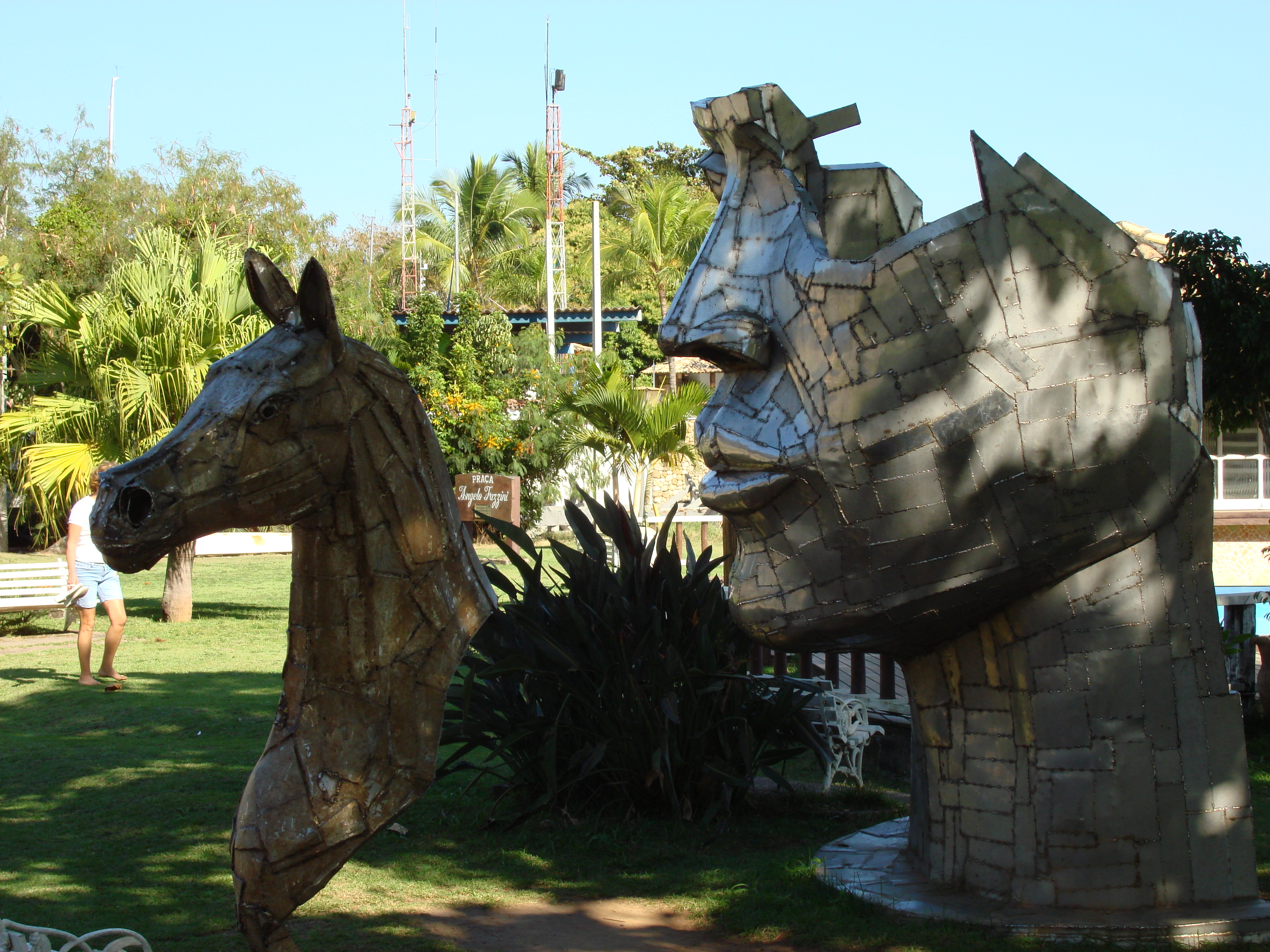
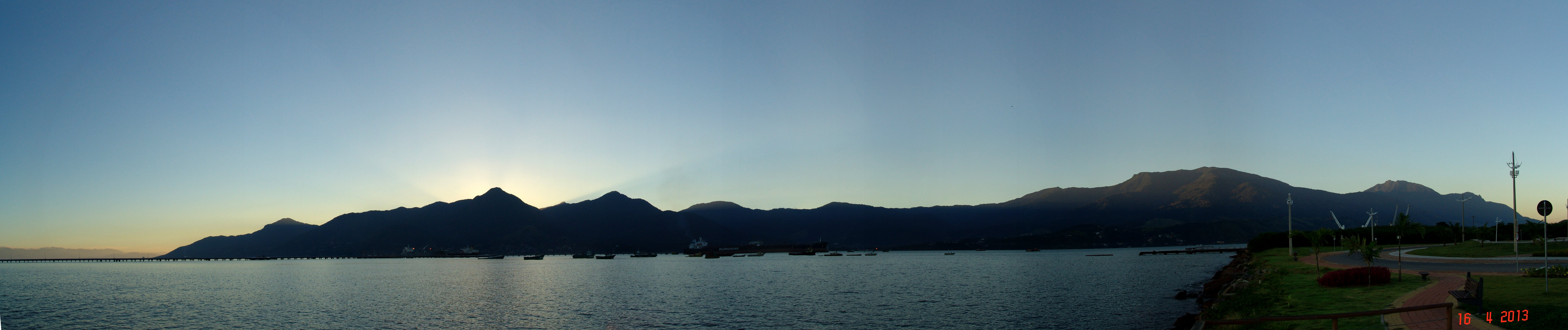

- Flag Coat of arms
- Nicknames: Ilhabela, Capital da Vela (Ilhabela, Capital of Sailing)
- Motto: Ilhabela da Princesa
- Location in the state of São Paulo and in Brazil
- Coordinates: 23°48′54″S 45°22′14″W
- Country: Brazil
- Region: Southeast
- State: São Paulo
- Settled: September 3, 1805

Government
  - Mayor: Toninho Colucci (Cidadania)

Area
  - Total: 347.52 km^{2} (134.18 sq mi)
- Elevation: 1,378 m (4,521 ft)

Population (2020)
  - Total: 35,591
  - Density: 102.41/km^{2} (265.25/sq mi)
- Time zone: UTC−3 (BRT)
- Postal Code: 11630-000
- Area code: +55 12
- HDI (2010): 0.756 – high
- Website: www.ilhabela.sp.gov.br

Ilhabela (Portuguese for Beautiful Island) is an archipelago and city situated in the Atlantic Ocean six kilometres (4 miles) off the coast of São Paulo state in Brazil. The city is 205 km (127 mi) from the city of São Paulo and 340 km (210 mi) from the city of Rio de Janeiro. The largest island, although commonly called Ilhabela, is officially named Ilha de São Sebastião (St. Sebastian Island). It, the other islands (Búzios, Pescadores and Vitória) and the islets (Cabras, Castelhanos, Enchovas, Figueira, Lagoa and Serraria) make up the municipality of Ilhabela.

Ilhabela is part of the Metropolitan Region of Vale do Paraíba e Litoral Norte. The population is 35,591 (2020 est.). The islands in total cover 347.52 km^{2} (134.18 sq mi). During the holiday months, up to one hundred thousand people may be on the island, since it is a popular destination for tourists. To access the city, one must take a boat or ferry in São Sebastião, as there are no roads which reach it. During the summer, one may wait several hours to take the ferry boat. The ferry takes 15 minutes to cross the channel between the two cities.

== History ==
=== Pre-colonial period and indigenous occupations ===
For at least 2,000 years before the arrival of the Portuguese, the archipelago had been inhabited by sambaqui indigenous peoples, and by ceramist peoples for at least 700 years.

These early inhabitants were fishermen and collectors who lived in open-air camps near beaches and bays. Their collections of shells, shellfish and ceramics are the only traces of their existence available for researchers to study them. They deduce these peoples would not consume much of the forests of the islands, probably picking no more than fruits and ingredients for remedies.

Before the Portuguese arrived, these tribes were replaced by tupi-guarani and jês peoples, who had mastered ceramic and agricultural techniques and left the only traces of an indigenous village, at the so-called "Vianna site" on the main island (São Sebastião Island). These tribes would take shelter under rocks during hunting and exploration expeditions.

=== Colonial Brazil period: sugar cane, gold export and pirate attacks ===
The first documented non-indigenous visit to the island was an expedition involving Italian cosmographer Amerigo Vespucci that arrived there on 20 January 1502. As with several other geographical features discovered by the Portuguese, the island was named after the saint of the day (Saint Sebastian).

Around that time, the island would provide shelter for pirates and corsairs coming mainly from England, France and the Netherlands. They would explore the island for firewood, food and water. They carried out a number of attacks against Portuguese ships and settlements (namely Santos, São Vicente and Bertioga), which cost Portugal several quantities of gold and other precious stones until the 17th century. Such events gave birth to legends of hidden treasures scattered around the city's territory.

Between 1588 and 1590 Edward Fenton and Thomas Cavendish went to the island. The latter was accompanied by John Davis, who had sought shelter in the island following a defeat in Vitória, Espírito Santo, only to lose even more men in a battle against the Portuguese. Another source says he actually took shelter in August 1591 in Ilhabela after looting Santos and São Vicente and only went to Vitória afterwards.

The first known land grant in Ilhabela happened in 1603 and extended into the 17th century. Around that time, the most common product to be cultivated and then exported to the metropolis was sugarcane, common throughout São Paulo's coastline, and planted in the areas facing the continent and even in more distant islands, such as Vitória and Búzios. The planting of sugarcane and production of sugar gained a boost between the 17th and 18th centuries and caused considerable deforestation.

With the development of slave trade, the channel between the island and the continent became a common route for slave ships. According to accounts from that time, some enslaved Africans managed to flee and established the first quilombos in the region, in distant areas of dense forests.

Between the 17th and 18th centuries, São Sebastião village was an important port to outflow gold found in areas now within Mato Grosso do Sul and Goiás. In order to provide protection for the ships leaving the coast, security around the channel was improved with forts, trenches and artilleries. The placing of these structures may have contributed to the establishment of the first white settlements in the area, still in the 17th century, which happened simultaneously to more sesmarias grants by the Portuguese. Such land would be used to grow sugarcane, tobacco and wild indigo.

Around that time, and also because of prosperous mining activities, the first whaling station of the Captaincy of São Paulo was built in Ponta das Canavieiras. It was believed to have focused on the local demand and that the facilities were granted by the Portuguese crown via a system under which the whaling station owners would invest in equipment and gear and, after ten years, everything would be claimed by the royal treasure.

The Captaincy of Rio de Janeiro restricted olive oil ships in its waters, believing that the northern coastline of São Paulo was actually devoted to gold smuggling. Therefore, from 1734 on, whales began to be killed for oil. Around 1850, as the animal became more and more rare, the hunting of whales and the whaling station were abandoned.

=== Transition from sugar to coffee and economic leadership ===
Showing increasing political, social and economical relevance, due to the boom in agricultural and commercial activities, São Sebastião Island was promoted by António José da Franca e Horta (who governed São Paulo at that time) in 1805 to village status and was then renamed as "Villa Bella da Princesa" ("Beautiful Island of the Princess").

Throughout the 19th century, activities concerning sugarcane began to decay, but they were soon replaced by coffee, following a trend seen around the rest of the Paraíba Valley. Production concentrated in Ponta do Boi, in the south part of the island, more precisely at Nossa Senhora das Galhetas, Figueira e Sombrio Farm. Growing coffee resulted in an even more intense deforestation than that caused by sugarcane, and the plants could be cultivated in altitudes higher than 500 meters, by the main island's escarpments.

In 1854, the island had a population of 10,769, concentrated on the continent-facing side. There were 225 farms in which 1775 enslaved people were forced to work; the village's production around that time was greater than that of any coastal municipality of São Paulo.

The coffee era in the area came to its end with the abolishment of slavery in Brazil and the island's economy saw a return to engenho activities (there were 36 engenhos in Ilhabela back then), only this time they would shift focus from sugar to aguardiente. Most of the latter would be exported in small quantities via the Port of Santos. The locals themselves would take the products to the port in canoes known as "vogas"; the knowledge to build them was inherited from the indigenous peoples who inhabited the area in the past. The São Paulo Geographical and Geological Commission left the following account on these boats:

It's the so called 'vogas' with two masts and a crew of six or more people that do this trip. They carry up to 18 barrels of aguardiente, in tenths or fifths, and it is by this type of load that its capacity is evaluated. They sail whenever possible, otherwise with paddles, when there's calm or contrary winds. (...) in general these vogas don't carry only aguardiente, although it constitutes the shipment of greatest quantity. Frequently a great quantity of 'greengroceries' follow, and it is one of the most curious things to see one of these 'vogas', ready to cast off. There's everything on board: lemons, coconuts and other fruits, goatlings, turkeys, hans, ducks, egs, mats and clay objects, well, an infinitude of diverse products, which are sold by the owner who trusted them to the canoe boss. Many times passengers also board, in a way that it becomes a true enigma how all that is arranged on the way...

Assembling these boats meant more deforestation, since the big and straight trees in the area - namely: ingá, custard, bocuíba-açú, coabí, Brazilian firetree, jequitibá, canela-moscada, canela-batalha, pau-d'alho, fig tree - were ideal to the vogas. Besides that, other trees had to be taken down throughout the whole process: some to open a path for the trunks to be transported, others so their trunks could be used as some sort of conveyor belt and some simply because their crowns were intertwined with the desired trees'. Production was so intense the village became the main voga manufacturing center of São Paulo coastline up to the 20th century.

A new production decline affected the island and was followed by a period of economic stagnation. By the 1920s, Japanese immigrants settled in the island ad brought international technologies; simultaneously, the arrival of the motor boat and surrounding nets gave local fishing activities a boost, since they were previously restricted to where traditional methods functioned efficiently. As such, the usage of vogas became increasingly obsolete.

Throughout the first half of the 20th century, fishing helped the island become a local power again. Saco do Sombrio, previously used as anchorage point for slave ships and for long deserted, became the largest fishing port of the island. It would provide shelter from strong winds to up to 20-25 boats at once and would be home to 450-500 people. The place became so important that it was promoted to district status in 1944, along with Búzios, Vitória and Pescadores islands (under the collective name of "Paranabi"). Aside from fishing, handicraft products and seaweed collecting also gained strength. The latter was taught by the Japanese and reached its peak between 1925 and 1932.

=== Economic downfall and rise with tourism ===
From the 1930s on, the village suffered the consequences of the world crisis consolidated around that time, which joined the Constitutionalist Revolution and the consequent sea block which São Paulo was subjected to. Japanese immigrants left the area, causing many fishermen and crew members to become unemployed. From 1933 to 1938, fish around the island suddenly disappeared, increasing their poverty. As the state's countryside became ready for exploration with the opening of new roads and railways, many migrated in search of better opportunities. This exodus contributed to a recovery trend seen on the local forests.

Local land was sold at devalued prices and, from the 1960s on, tourism rose as an option to save the island's economy. The local infrastructure was improved and Ilhabela began to be sold as "symbol of adventure, pleasure and the wild".

Tourism and real estate speculation became new threats to the local forests, which prompted environmentalists to demand the creation of special reserves in the island, which gave birth to the Ilhabela State Park in the 1970s. According to a 2005 research, tourism, along with activities at the Port of São Sebastião and the local Petrobrás Terminal, became the main local vectors of environmental pressure. More recently, in 2011, exploitation points of the Pre-salt layer joined the previous vectors.

Among the current critical issues of the island, is the lack of proper sewage pipes to collect all houses' wastewater. As of January 2012, 46,6% of the buildings in the island lacked such infrastructure. In February 2016, the city hall announced R$12 million to be invested in sewer systems for the southern part of the city. By the time it was announced, Ilhabela was the worst coastal municipality in the state of São Paulo in terms of sanitary treatment, according to a research by the State Secretary of the Environment - 35% of the city's sewer is collected, pre-conditioned and released on the sea, according to the secretary, while the city hall claims 61% of the city is covered by sewer systems.

== Geography ==
=== Territory ===
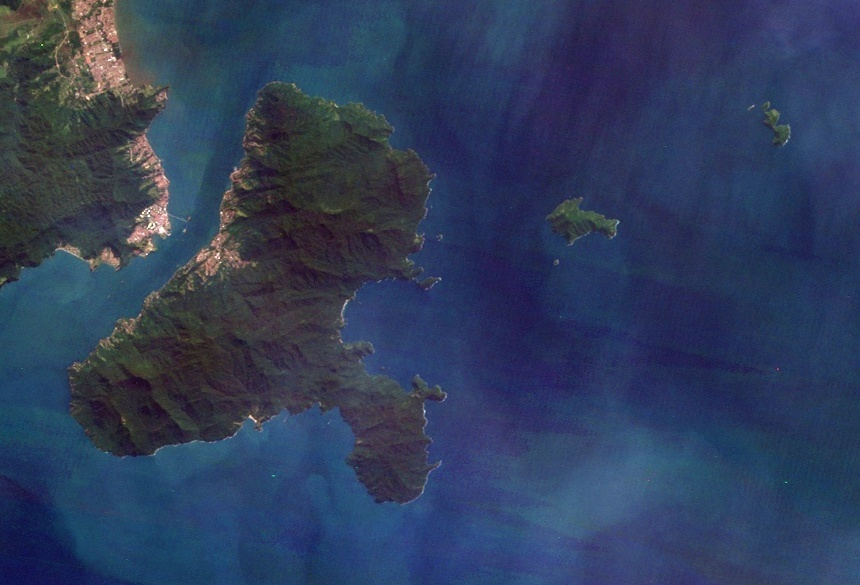
Satellite image of the Ilhabela archipelago. Major islands from left to right: Ilha de São Sebastião, Búzios island and Vitória island.

The main islands of the archipelago are São Sebastião (33737 ha), Búzios (739 ha), Vitória (219 ha) dos Pescadores (20 ha) - all of which inhabited. There are also the very small islets (das Cabras, da Sumítica, da Serraria, dos Castelhanos, da Lagoa, da Figueira and das Enchovas islands). Almost all the urbanized areas are in the very narrow plains between the sea and the mountains of the main island, preferably at the west part, facing the continent.

A short (30 km) but high mountain range forms this main island, reaching above 1,000 meters in seven different points - Pico de São Sebastião (1,378 m), Morro do Papagaio (1,302 m), Pico da Serraria (1,285 m), Morro do Ramalho (1,205 m), Morro do Simão (1,102 m), Morro das Tocas (1,079 m) and Pico do Baepi (1,048 m). Running approximately 8 km into the Atlantic Ocean off the southeast corner of the island, there is the Península do Boi (Ox Peninsula). The east side of the island is inhabited by very few people, who concentrates mainly on the Castelhanos beach, the only on this side accessible by road. Only 4x4 jeeps are able to cross this particular road, though.

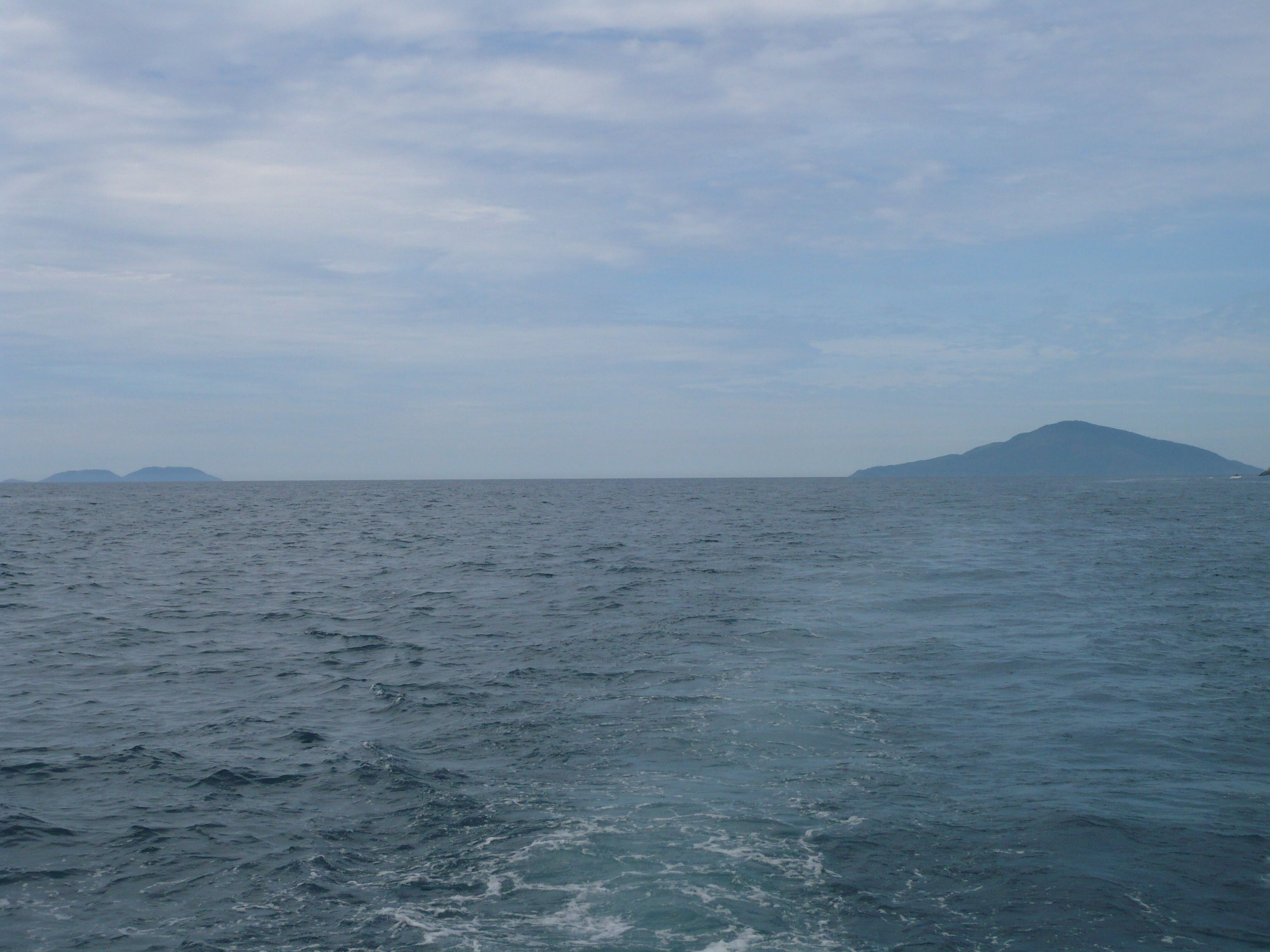
Vitória (left) and Búzios (right) islands seen from the South.

Vitória, dos Pescadores and Búzios islands are 38, 37 and 24 km off the continent, respectively. Buzios and Vitória islands, 7½ and 2½ km away from the northeastern tip of the main island, respectively, are home to 142 and 50 caiçaras, respectively. Only canoes are able to go to the island, since the piers available are in poor condition. Both islands have traces of indigenous cemeteries. The locals will plant and grow their own food, though the number of fish is decreasing, but Búzios Island has two markets. There's no drinking water and people normally urinate and defecate on the vegetation.

The islands possess no medical structures and locals depend on the periodic visits of team sent by the city hall, comprising doctors, nurses, dentists and psychologists. The islands are so isolated the government contemplated building a prison on one of them in the early 20th century. One of the engineers hired to analyze the possibility was Euclides da Cunha, who left the following comment about Vitória Island: "[the island has] capacity for a settlement several times larger, its abandonment being explained by its distance".

=== Fauna and flora ===
Blue manakin in Ilhabela

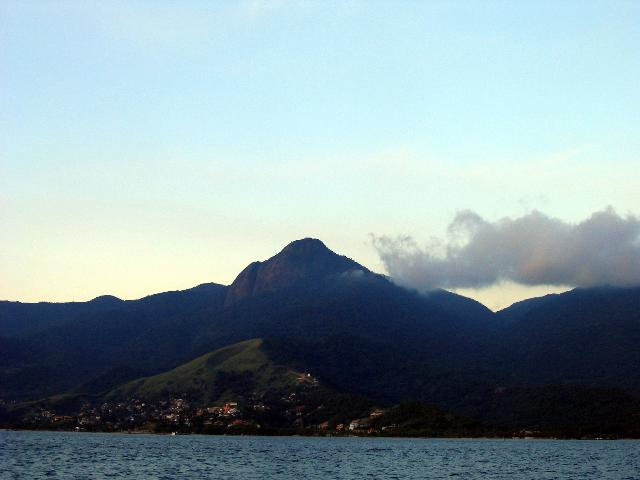
Pico do Baepi (Baepi's Peak)

The fauna and flora in Ilhabela prompted the government to create the Ilhabela State Park on 20 January 1977 via the state decree 9414, establishing is area in 27,025 hectares (which corresponds to 84,3% of the municipality's territory, including a large portion of the main island, 11 other islands, three islets, three lajes and one placer). The park's importance made it be considered a bioshpere reserve by UNESCO, an Alliance for Zero Extinction (AZE) area of interest and an Important Bird Area (IBA).

A 2015 research by Fundação Florestal listed 1,569 flora species within the park.

Ilhabela is home to endemic species such as the Giant Atlantic tree-rat, the serpents Siphonops insulanus and Liotyphlops caissara and tegus (Tupinambis merianae sebastiani and Tupinambis merianae buzionensis, the latter is endemic to the Búzios island), also being a point of observation of 66 bird species exclusive to the Atlantic Forest (five of them considered globally endangered in 2015).

There are also historical accounts of the presence of jaguars on the island. The first dates back to 1562, when José de Anchieta wrote in a letter to King Sebastian that the island was deserted, but contained "many tigers" (Portuguese explorers were more familiar with African and Asian animals, which they would use as parameters). Another account comes from 1877, then the local population killed the last known jaguar on the island, which supposedly swam all the way from the continent. Finally, it is known that in 1912 the São Paulo Geographical and Geological Commission registered one particular place with the name "Pedra da Onça" (Jaguar Rock).

Urban occupation is seen as a potential threat to the preservation of local species. Structures such as the Castelhanos road, which allows terrestrial vehicles to access Castelhanos Beach on the other side of the island, concern specialists, who recommend caution when allowing visitors into the area.

=== Hydrography ===
2015 research by Fundação Florestal showed that, although the quality of water around is good due to the dense forests, it may be affected by intense tourism and the presence of caiçara communities lacking proper sewer systems.

=== Climate ===
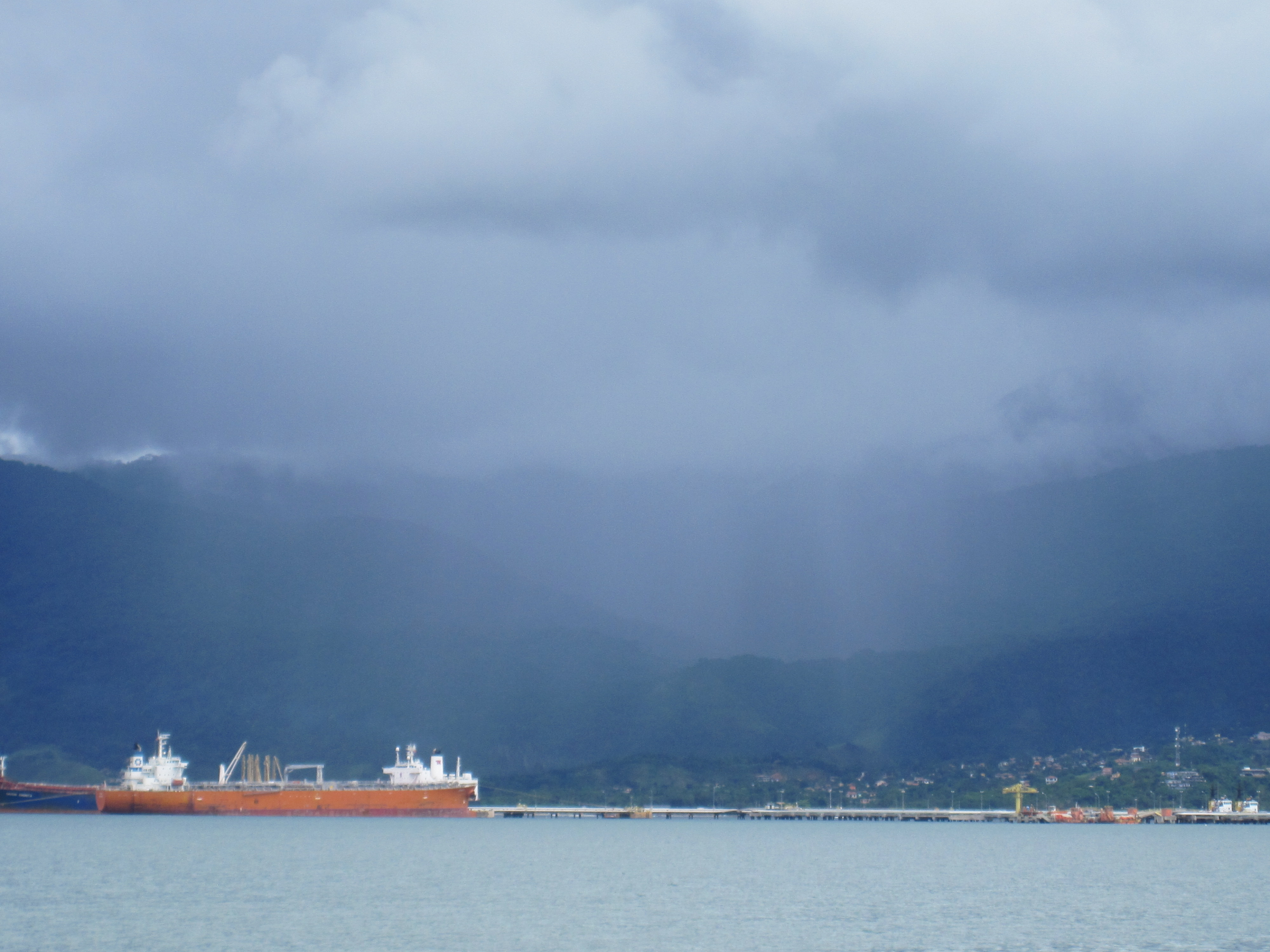
Rain falling on Ilhabela (seen from São Sebastião)

Most of the city has a tropical climate, but the mountains have an oceanic climate, because of the high altitude. The Atlantic Forest covers the entire city.

A distinct feature of the local climate is the difference in the relative humidity of both sides of the island. The high mountains that form the territory of the main island function as a wall against clouds, forcing them to go up and allowing for the condensation of steam and causing orographic rains.

== Tourism ==
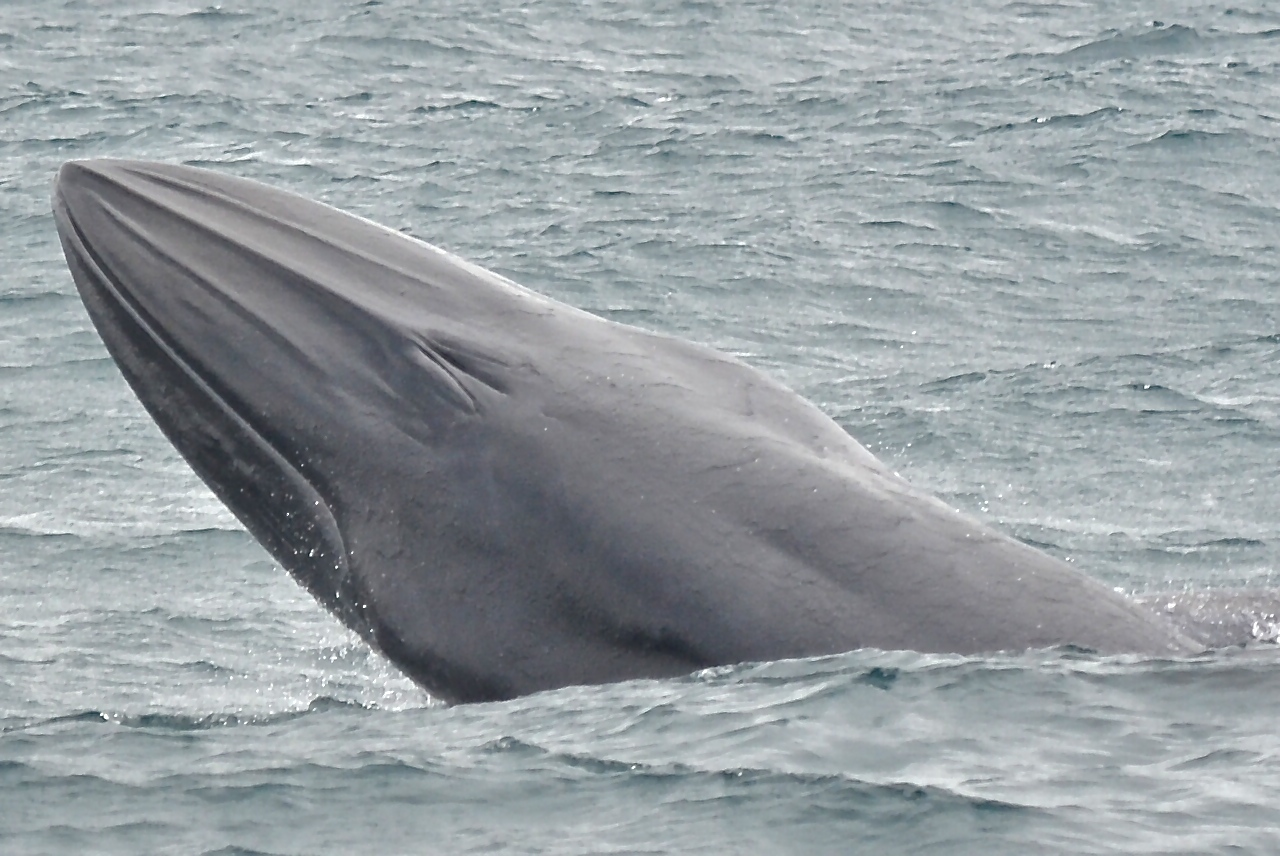
Bryde's whale breaching in Castelhanos Bay

Ilhabela is a popular sailing point. Several regattas take place at the city's coast. Also, it is popular for many other watersports, including scuba and free diving. The waters around the archipelago are filled with more than 50 shipwrecks, six of them being opened for visiting via diving. Cetacean diversity is rich in the areas, and whale watchings targeting such as humpback whales, bryde's whales, minke whales, southern right whales, orcas, and dolphins are also available.

There are many hiking trails with varying degrees of difficulty and 360 waterfalls in the Atlantic jungle.

=== Beaches ===
Location of Ilhabela in the Atlantic Ocean

There are 41 beaches on the main island. The ones located along the channel are in general urbanized and feature calm to moderate waves. The ones facing the ocean are clean and less affected by humans, besides featuring stronger waves, which attracts surfers. These can only be reached by foot and/or by boat, the exception being Castelhanos, as explained above. Bonete was considered the ninth best beach of Brazil by The Guardian. Starting from Castelhanos and going counterclockwise, the beaches are:

- dos Castelhanos
- Saco do Eustáquio
- Guanxuma
- da Caveira
- da Serraria
- do Poço
- da Fome
- Jabaquara
- Pacuíba
- da Armação
- do Pinto
- da Ponta Azeda
- Pedra do Sino
- do Arrozal
- Siriúba
- do Viana
- Mercedes
- Saco do Indaiá
- Saco Grande
- Saco da Capela
- Pequeá
- Engenho d'Água
- Itaquanduba
- Itaguassu
- Perequê
- Barra Velha
- da Pedra Miúda
- do Oscar
- do Portinho
- Feiticeira
- do Julião or Prainha
- Grande
- do Curral
- do Veloso
- Bonete
- Enchovas
- Indaiúba
- Saco do Sombrio
- da Figueira
- Vermelha
- Mansa

== Economy ==
The municipality's economy is based on tourism, commerce and civil construction, with fishing, handicraft and public service coming as secondary economical activities. In 2016, it was ranked among the ten best Brazilian municipalities in terms of tax management by a FIRJAN index.

== Transportation ==
The only way to access the island by car is via the ferry boats that cross the channel. Each boat carries up to 70 vehicles and takes 15 minutes to sail through the 2.4 kilometers that separate the two stations.

The SP-131 is the main road on the main island, running from the southwestern coast of the island to its northern coast.

== Media ==
In telecommunications, the city was served by Companhia de Telecomunicações do Estado de São Paulo until 1975, when it began to be served by Telecomunicações de São Paulo. In July 1998, this company was acquired by Telefónica, which adopted the Vivo brand in 2012.

The company is currently an operator of cell phones, fixed lines, internet (fiber optics/4G) and television (satellite and cable).

== See also ==
- List of municipalities in São Paulo

== Bibliography ==
- Parque Estadual de Ilhabela - Plano de Manejo - Resumo Executivo (PDF) (Report). Fundação para Conservação e Produção Florestal do Estado de São Paulo/Secretary of Environment of the São Paulo State Government. December 2015.
