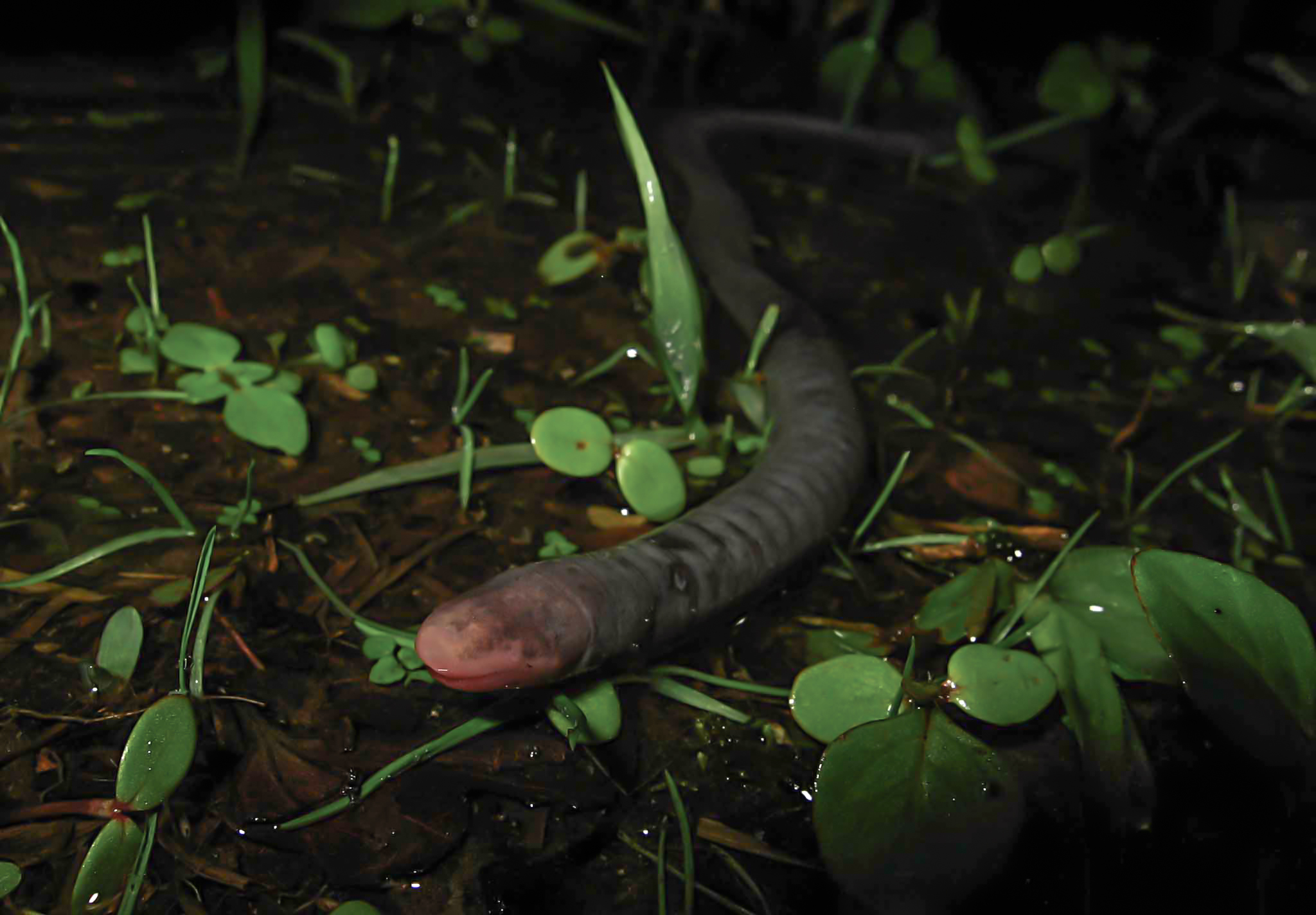

Conservation status
- Least Concern (IUCN 3.1)

Scientific classification
- Kingdom: Animalia
- Phylum: Chordata
- Class: Amphibia
- Order: Gymnophiona
- Clade: Apoda
- Family: Siphonopidae
- Genus: Microcaecilia
- Species: M. pricei

Binomial name
- Microcaecilia pricei (Dunn, 1944)

Synonyms
- Gymnopis pricei Dunn, 1944; Parvicaecilia pricei (Dunn, 1944)

= Microcaecilia pricei =

Species of amphibian

Microcaecilia pricei is a species of caecilian in the family Siphonopidae. It is endemic to Colombia. Its natural habitats are subtropical or tropical moist lowland forests, subtropical or tropical moist montane forests, pastureland, plantations, rural gardens, heavily degraded former forest, and irrigated land.
