= Ilhabela State Park =

State park in São Paulo, Brazil

- Parque Estadual de Ilhabela
- IUCN category II (national park)
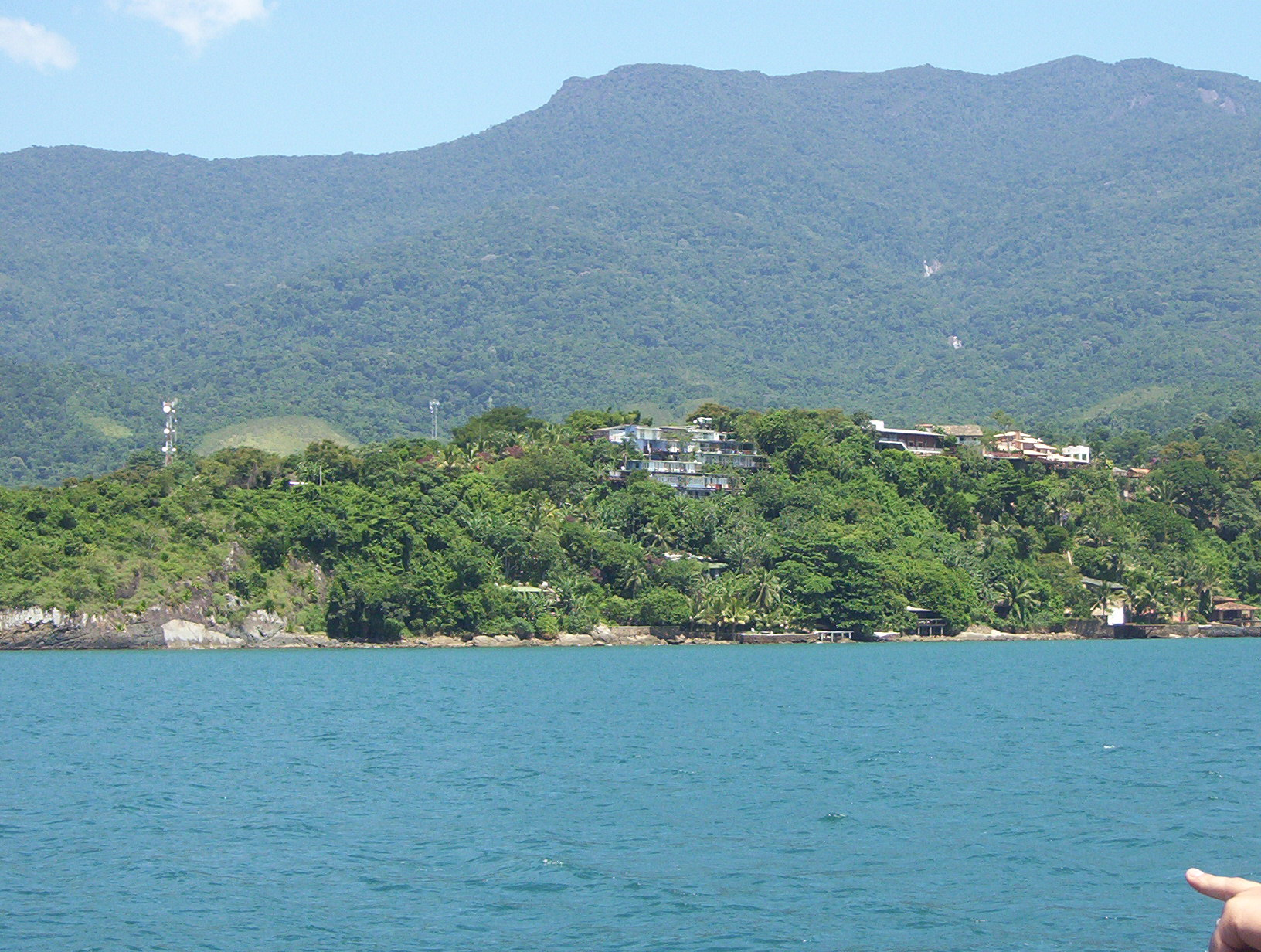
- Park rising behind shore buildings

- Location within Brazil
- Nearest city: Ilhabela, São Paulo
- Coordinates: 23.851944°S 45.343889°W
- Area: 27,025 hectares (66,780 acres)
- Designation: State park
- Created: 20 January 1977

The Ilhabela State Park (Portuguese: Parque Estadual de Ilhabela) is a state park in the state of São Paulo, Brazil. It protects an area of Atlantic Forest on an archipelago in the South Atlantic off the northeast coast of the state, including most of the mountainous island of São Sebastião.

== Location ==
The Ilhabela State Park is in the Vale do Ribeira region of southern São Paulo. It covers 85% of the municipality of Ilhabela, São Paulo. It has an area of 27,025 hectares (66,780 acres), covering all or part of twelve islands, two islets and two reefs. The archipelago includes the island of São Sebastião, which holds the municipal seat, and the smaller islands of Búzios, Vitória and others. On São Sebastião the park boundary starts at an altitude of 200 metres (660 ft) along the São Sebastião channel, dropping to 100 metres (330 ft) between Ponta da Sela to the south and Ponta das Canas to the north, and coming down to the shore around Ponta do Boi. The other islands are completely contained within the park.

== History ==
The Ilhabela State Park was created by Governor Paulo Egydio Martins by decree 9.414 of 20 January 1977. The purpose was to fully protect the flora, fauna and natural beauties of the islands in the municipality of Ilhabela, and to allow use for educational, recreational and scientific purposes. The consultative council was formed in 2004, including representatives of the public sector, civil society and caiçaras communities. The park is included in the Atlantic Forest Preservation Project (PPMA), a partnership between the São Paulo Environment Secretariat and the German bank KfW.

== Environment ==
The Ilhabela State Park preserves 3% of the remaining Atlantic Forest in the state of São Paulo. Terrain ranges from beaches up to mountain ridges, with the slopes covered in forest. The island of São Sebastião includes the peaks of Baepi: 1,025 metres (3,363 ft), Papagaio: 1,037 metres (3,402 ft) and São Sebastião: 1,379 metres (4,524 ft). The mountains intercept the moist air coming from the sea to produce a tropical humid climate with high rainfall. There are thousands of streams and over 250 waterfalls of many sizes. In the coastal plains meandering rivers support mangroves. In the sea the islands, islets and reefs support diverse flora and fauna.

Vegetation includes forest, restinga and mangroves. The forest includes trees from 20 to 30 metres (66 to 98 ft) high, and epiphytes such as Bromeliaceae and Orchidaceae. It supports hundreds of species of mammals, reptiles and birds, many endemic and some endangered. Mammals include robust capuchin monkeys, Brazilian squirrel (Sciurus aestuans) and ocelot (Leopardus pardalis). The giant Atlantic tree-rat (Phyllomys thomasi) is endemic to the Ilhabela restinga. Birds include toucans, pionus parrots, Brazilian tanager (Ramphocelus bresilius), solitary tinamou (Tinamus solitarius), black hawk-eagle (Spizaetus tyrannus), brown-backed parrotlet (Touit melanonotus), penelopes and black-fronted piping guan (Pipile jacutinga). The archipelago is also a refuge for migratory birds.

== Visiting ==
The park is open for visits from 9:00 to 16:30 daily. The 2,145 metres (7,037 ft) Trilha da Água Branca (White Water Trail) is of medium difficulty, leading through rich Atlantic Forest vegetation where many species of birds may be seen. It leads to several waterfalls. The park can provide guides for groups taking this trail by prior appointment. The park is home to Caiçaras communities, whose people engage in occupations such as fishing and making handicrafts, and celebrate popular traditional festivals such as the Congada de São Sebastião.

== Sources ==
- Martins, Paulo Egydio (20 January 1977), Decreto n. 9.414, de 20 de Janeiro de 1977 (in Portuguese), State of São Paulo
- Parque Estadual de Ilhabela (in Portuguese), Parque Estadual de Ilhabela
- Vale do Ribeira (in Portuguese), São Paulo State Government
