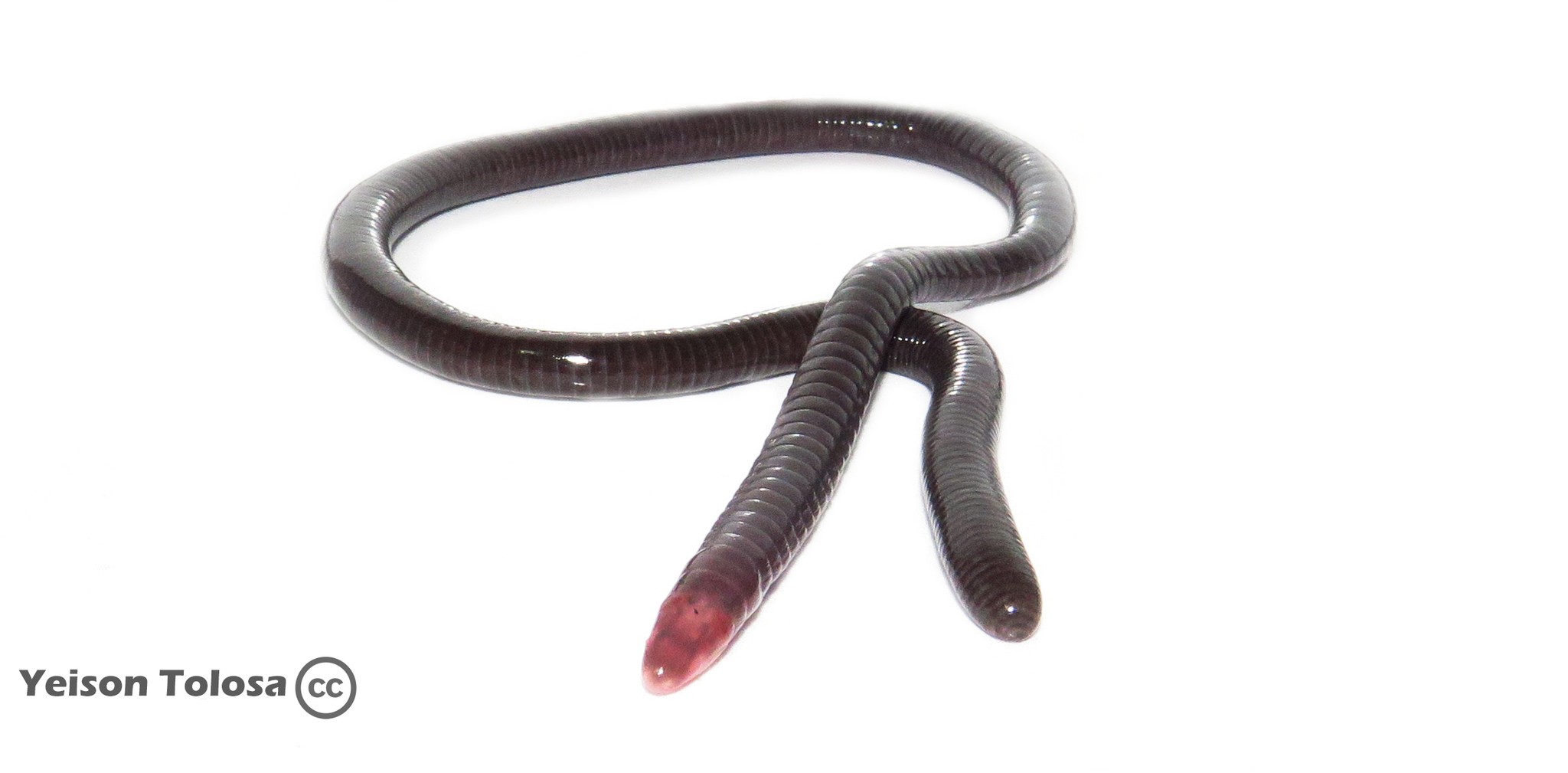

Conservation status
- Least Concern (IUCN 3.1)

Scientific classification
- Kingdom: Animalia
- Phylum: Chordata
- Class: Amphibia
- Order: Gymnophiona
- Clade: Apoda
- Family: Siphonopidae
- Genus: Microcaecilia
- Species: M. nicefori

Binomial name
- Microcaecilia nicefori (Barbour, 1924)

Synonyms
- Gymnophis nicefori Barbour, 1924; Parvicaecilia nicefori (Barbour, 1924)

= Microcaecilia nicefori =

Species of amphibian

Microcaecilia nicefori is a species of caecilian in the family Siphonopidae. It is endemic to Colombia. Its natural habitats are subtropical or tropical moist lowland forests, arable land, pastureland, plantations, rural gardens, heavily degraded former forest, and irrigated land.
