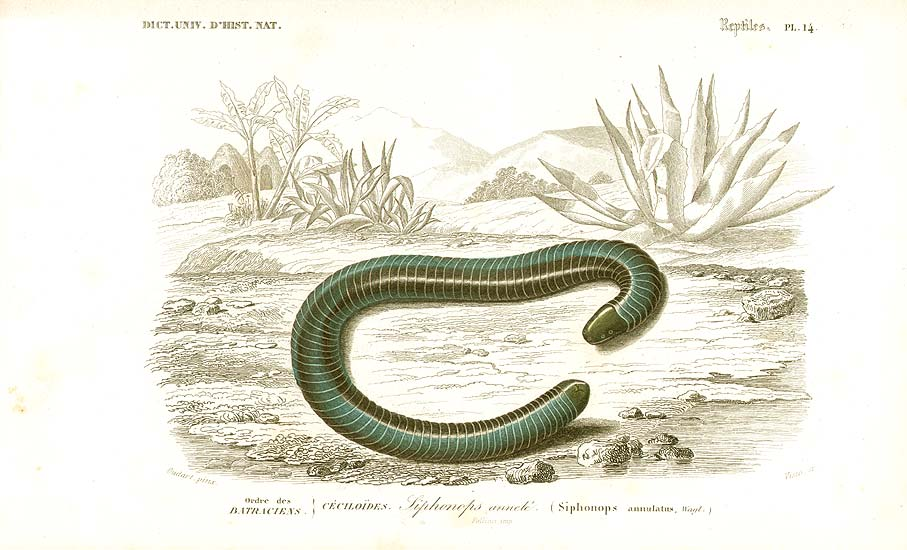
- Siphonops annulatus

Scientific classification
- Kingdom: Animalia
- Phylum: Chordata
- Class: Amphibia
- Order: Gymnophiona
- Clade: Apoda
- Family: Siphonopidae; Bonaparte, 1850

Genera
- Brasilotyphlus; Luetkenotyphlus; Microcaecilia; Mimosiphonops; Siphonops

= Siphonopidae =

Family of amphibians

The Siphonopidae are the family of common caecilians. They are found in Central and South America. Like other caecilians, they superficially resemble worms or snakes.

They are the sister group to Dermophiidae, also of South America. Siphonopids are oviparous caecilians, meaning they lay eggs. They have imperforated stapes and no inner mandibular teeth. Like species of some other caecilian families, their skulls have relatively few bones, with those present being fused to form a solid ram to aid in burrowing through the soil. The mouth is recessed beneath the snout, and there is no tail.

== Genera and species ==
- Genus Brasilotyphlus
  - Brasilotyphlus braziliensis
  - Brasilotyphlus dubium
  - Brasilotyphlus guarantanus
- Genus Luetkenotyphlus
  - Luetkenotyphlus brasiliensis
  - Luetkenotyphlus fredi
  - Luetkenotyphlus insulanus
- Genus Microcaecilia
  - Microcaecilia albiceps
  - Microcaecilia butantan
  - Microcaecilia dermatophaga
  - Microcaecilia grandis
  - Microcaecilia iwokramae
  - Microcaecilia iyob
  - Microcaecilia marvaleewakeae
  - Microcaecilia nicefori
  - Microcaecilia pricei
  - Microcaecilia rabei
  - Microcaecilia rochai
  - Microcaecilia savagei
  - Microcaecilia supernumeraria
  - Microcaecilia taylori
  - Microcaecilia trombetas
  - Microcaecilia unicolor
- Genus Mimosiphonops
  - Mimosiphonops reinhardti
  - Mimosiphonops vermiculatus
- Genus Siphonops
  - Siphonops annulatus
  - Siphonops hardyi
  - Siphonops leucoderus
  - Siphonops paulensis
