= Microcaecilia albiceps =

Conservation status
- Least Concern (IUCN 3.1)

Scientific classification
- Kingdom: Animalia
- Phylum: Chordata
- Class: Amphibia
- Order: Gymnophiona
- Clade: Apoda
- Family: Siphonopidae
- Genus: Microcaecilia
- Species: M. albiceps

Binomial name
- Microcaecilia albiceps (Boulenger, 1882)

Synonyms
- Dermophis albiceps Boulenger, 1882

Species of amphibian

Microcaecilia albiceps is a species of caecilian in the family Siphonopidae. It is found in the Amazonian lowlands and slopes of the eastern Andes in Colombia (Caquetá and Putumayo Departments) and Ecuador (Napo Province), possibly extending into Loreto in Amazonian Peru.

Microcaecilia albiceps occurs in tropical primary forests where it lives underground. It has also been found in degraded forest, but it is unknown whether it can adapt to such habitat. Threats to this widespread species are believed to be localized only.
