= Mimosiphonops vermiculatus =

Conservation status
- Data Deficient (IUCN 3.1)

Scientific classification
- Kingdom: Animalia
- Phylum: Chordata
- Class: Amphibia
- Order: Gymnophiona
- Clade: Apoda
- Family: Siphonopidae
- Genus: Mimosiphonops
- Species: M. vermiculatus

Binomial name
- Mimosiphonops vermiculatus Taylor, 1968

Synonyms
- Pseudosiphonops ptychodermis Taylor, 1968

Species of amphibian

Mimosiphonops vermiculatus is a species of caecilian in the family Siphonopidae. It is endemic to Brazil and known with certainty only from its type locality, Teresópolis in the Rio de Janeiro state. Common name worm-patterned caecilian has been proposed for this species.

== Description ==
Mimosiphonops vermiculatus measure 186–290 mm (7.3–11.4 in) in total length (two females and one specimen of unknown sex). There are 96–98 vertebrae and 87–88 primary annuli. The body is slightly dorsoventrally compressed throughout and narrows gently over the first nine annuli. The eyes are partly visible through skin and are very slightly elevated. The mouth is recessed, and the snout projects strongly beyond its anterior margin. The ground colour is light blue-grey or, after the outer skin layer is lost, darker brown. There is a longitudinal whitish stripe on the ventral surface of the collars.

== Habitat and conservation ==
The holotype was collected from about 800 m (2,600 ft) above sea level. It is a subterranean species found under bark, logs and stones in moist forest. It is probably oviparous with direct development (i.e, there is no free-living larval stage).

Threats to this poorly-known species are unknown.
