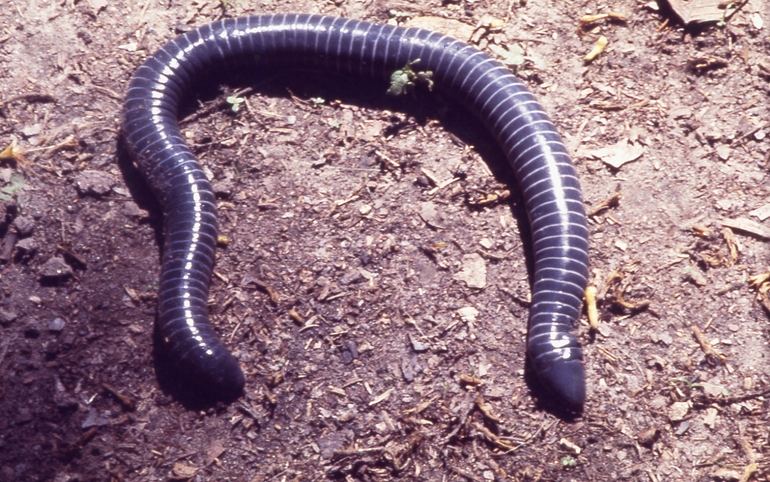
- Siphonops annulatus

Scientific classification
- Domain: Eukaryota
- Kingdom: Animalia
- Phylum: Chordata
- Class: Amphibia
- Order: Gymnophiona
- Clade: Apoda
- Family: Siphonopidae
- Genus: Siphonops; Wagler, 1828

= Siphonops =

Genus of amphibians

Siphonops is a genus of caecilians in the family Siphonopidae, found in South America. All species are known to occur within Brazil, however, only S. hardyi and S. leucoderus are endemic to it. The native ranges of the other two known species, S. annulatus and S. paulensis, extend outwards into the surrounding countries of Argentina, Bolivia, and Paraguay. S. annulatus's range extends even further, stretching into Colombia, Ecuador, French Guiana, Guyana, Peru, Suriname, and Venezuela, and giving it perhaps the most widespread distribution of any single caecilian species.

Siphonops contains the following four species:

- Siphonops annulatus — ringed caecilian
- Siphonops hardyi — Hardy's caecilian
- Siphonops leucoderus — Salvador caecilian
- Siphonops paulensis — Boettger's caecilian, cutuchi
