= Johannes Theodor Reinhardt =

Danish zoologist (1816–1882)

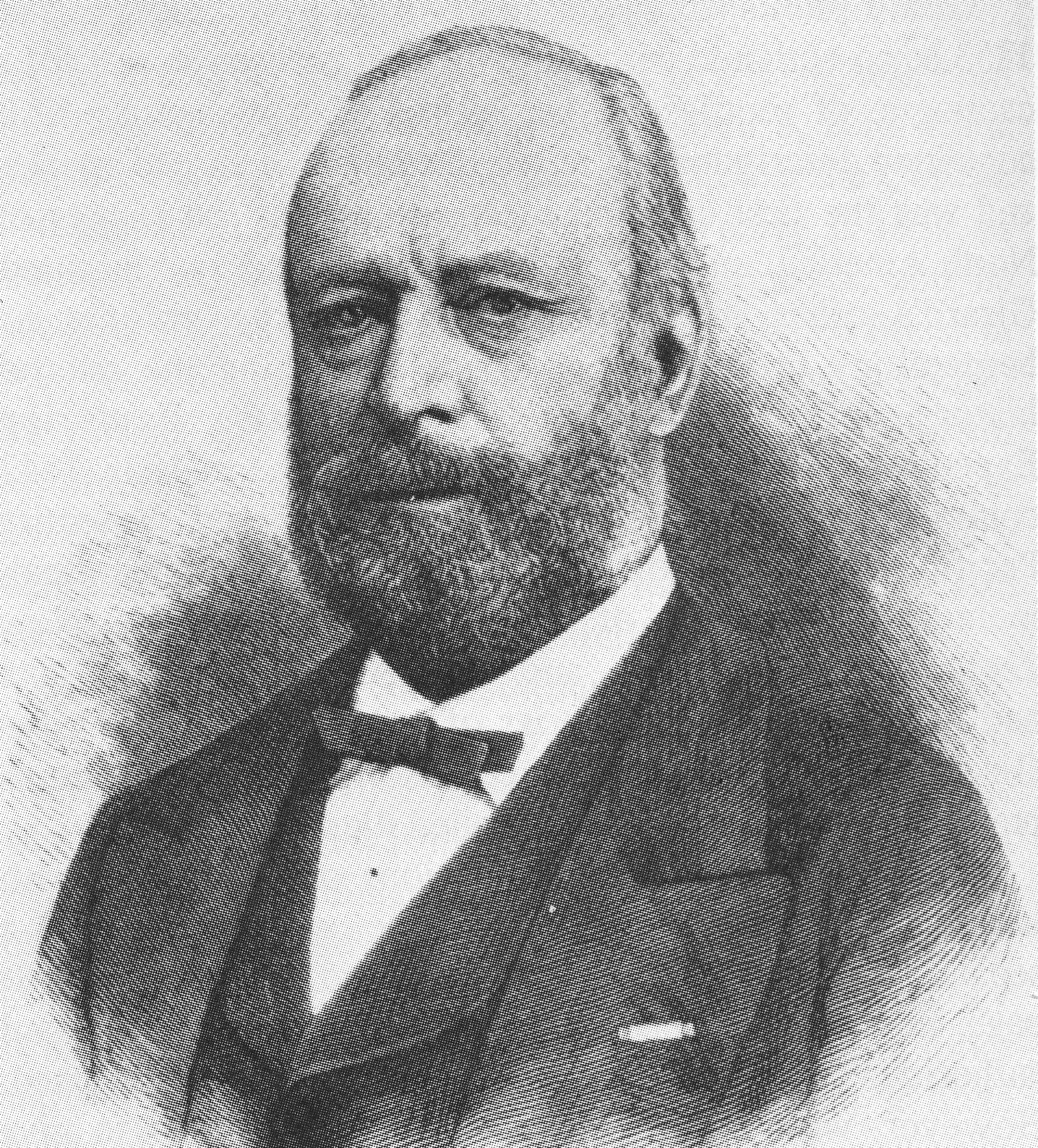
- Born: 3 December 1816; Copenhagen, Denmark
- Died: 23 October 1882 (aged 65); Frederiksberg, Denmark
- Father: Johan Reinhardt
- Scientific career
- Fields: Zoology
- Author abbrev. (zoology): Reinhardt

Johannes Theodor Reinhardt (3 December 1816, in Copenhagen – 23 October 1882, in Frederiksberg) was a Danish zoologist and herpetologist. He was the son of Johan Reinhardt.

== Biography ==
He participated as botanist in the first Galathea Expedition (1845—1847). In 1848 he became a curator at the Kongelige Naturhistoriske Museum in Copenhagen (now University of Copenhagen Zoological Museum). He taught classes in zoology at the Danmarks Tekniske Universitet (1856–1878) and at the University of Copenhagen (1861–1878). In 1854 he received the title of professor.

During the 1840s and 1850s he periodically worked in Brazil as an assistant to palaeontologist Peter Wilhelm Lund (1801–1880). He was an early supporter of Charles Darwin’s theory of evolution, and from his research of extinct species, was critical of George Cuvier's concept of "anti-evolutionary catastrophism".

With Christian Frederik Lütken (1827–1901), he was co-author of Bidrag til Kundskab om Brasiliens Padder og Krybdyr (Contributions to the knowledge of Brazilian amphibians and reptiles).

He described 25 new species of reptiles, some with Lütken.

In 1848, Hermann Schlegel named the Calabar "python", Calabaria reinhardtii, in his honor. Reinhardt's caecilian, Mimosiphonops reinhardti, was named for him in 1992, more than 100 years after he had collected the holotype.

== See also ==
- Category:Taxa named by Johannes Theodor Reinhardt
