= ARV1 =

Protein-coding gene in humans

Identifiers
- Aliases: ARV1, ARV1 homolog (S. cerevisiae), ARV1 homolog, fatty acid homeostasis modulator, EIEE38, DEE38
- External IDs: OMIM: 611647; MGI: 1916115; GeneCards: ARV1

Gene location (Human)
Chr.	Chromosome 1 (human)
Band	1q42.2	Start	230,978,981 bp
Band	1q42.2	End	231,000,733 bp

Gene location (Mouse)
Chr.	Chromosome 8 (mouse)
Band	8|8 E2	Start	125,448,878 bp
Band	8|8 E2	End	125,460,862 bp
RNA expression pattern
Bgee	Human / Mouse (ortholog); Top expressed in: cardiac muscle tissue of right atrium; myocardium of left ventricle; parotid gland; skin of arm; tibialis anterior muscle; mucosa of ileum; pancreatic epithelial cell; right ventricle; deltoid muscle; pons / Top expressed in: yolk sac; neural layer of retina; spermatocyte; epiblast; embryo; neural tube; tail of embryo; lens; ventricular zone; embryo; More reference expression data
BioGPS	n/a
Gene ontology
Molecular function	sterol transporter activity
Cellular component	integral component of membrane; membrane; endoplasmic reticulum; endoplasmic reticulum membrane; Golgi apparatus; cortical endoplasmic reticulum
Biological process	cholesterol transport; cholesterol biosynthetic process; lipid metabolism; bile acid metabolic process; lipid transport; steroid metabolic process; cholesterol metabolic process; regulation of intracellular cholesterol transport; regulation of cholesterol metabolic process; sphingolipid metabolic process; regulation of plasma membrane sterol distribution; sterol metabolic process; intracellular sterol transport
Sources:Amigo / QuickGO
Orthologs
Databases	NCBI: entry; OMA: entry
Species	Human	Mouse
Entrez	64801	68865
Ensembl	ENSG00000173409	ENSMUSG00000031982
UniProt	Q9H2C2	Q9D0U9
RefSeq (mRNA)	NM_022786; NM_001346992	NM_026855; NM_001368372
RefSeq (protein)	NP_001333921; NP_073623	NP_081131; NP_001355301
Location (UCSC)	Chr 1: 230.98 – 231 Mb	Chr 8: 125.45 – 125.46 Mb
PubMed search
- Wikidata
View/Edit Human	View/Edit Mouse

Acyl-coA acyltransferase-related enzyme 2 required for viability is a protein that in humans is encoded by the ARV1 gene. It is involved in lipid trafficking. ARV1 is ubiquitously expressed in higher eukaryotes, and in Saccharomyces cerevisiae yeast, is required for viability. Arv1^{-/-} knockout mice display a phenotype with reduced white adipose and favorable blood lipid profiles on a chow diet. ARV1 is hypothesized to be involved in neurodevelopment, as a splice variant of ARV1 with a 40 amino acid truncation causes epileptic encephalopathy in infants.d Arv1^{-/-} mice corroborate this observation. In yeast knockouts, supplanting human ARV1 through plasmid transfection rescues cells from death.
