= Microcaecilia unicolor =

Conservation status
- Least Concern (IUCN 3.1)

Scientific classification
- Kingdom: Animalia
- Phylum: Chordata
- Class: Amphibia
- Order: Gymnophiona
- Clade: Apoda
- Family: Siphonopidae
- Genus: Microcaecilia
- Species: M. unicolor

Binomial name
- Microcaecilia unicolor (A.H.A. Duméril, 1864)

Species of amphibian

Microcaecilia unicolor is a species of amphibian in the family Siphonopidae. It is endemic to French Guiana. Its natural habitats are subtropical or tropical moist lowland forests, plantations, rural gardens, urban areas, and heavily degraded former forest.
