= Brasilotyphlus guarantanus =

Scientific classification
- Kingdom: Animalia
- Phylum: Chordata
- Class: Amphibia
- Order: Gymnophiona
- Clade: Apoda
- Family: Siphonopidae
- Genus: Brasilotyphlus
- Species: B. guarantanus

Binomial name
- Brasilotyphlus guarantanus Maciel, Mott, and Hoogmoed, 2009

Species of amphibian

Brasilotyphlus guarantanus is a species of caecilian in the family Caeciliidae. It was described in 2009 from a specimen collected in the north part of Mato Grosso, Brazil.
