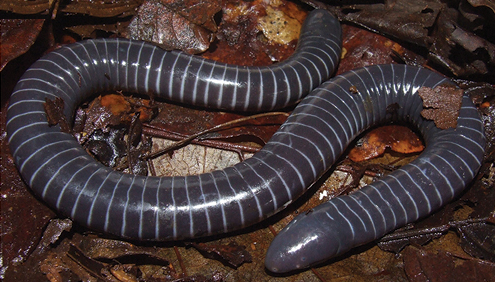

Conservation status
- Least Concern (IUCN 3.1)

Scientific classification
- Kingdom: Animalia
- Phylum: Chordata
- Class: Amphibia
- Order: Gymnophiona
- Clade: Apoda
- Family: Siphonopidae
- Genus: Siphonops
- Species: S. annulatus

Binomial name
- Siphonops annulatus (Mikan, 1820)

Synonyms
- Caecilia interrupta Cuvier, 1829; Dermophis crassus Cope, 1885; Siphonops annulatus ssp. marmoratus Sawaya, 1937

= Siphonops annulatus =

Species of amphibian

Siphonops annulatus, the ringed caecilian, is a species of caecilian in the family Siphonopidae endemic to South America. It may have the broadest known distribution of any terrestrial caecilian species.

== Description ==
Ringed caecilian measures 286–450 mm (11.3–17.7 in) in total length. The body is cylindrical and is slightly wider than it is deep. It is bluish-black to slate in colour. The annular grooves that completely encircle the body (except the 3–4 posteriormost ones) are edged in white or cream.

A team of scientists from Brazil and the United States discovered that these organisms have skin glands with different specialized functions. Glands on the head of the animals excrete lubricating mucus which may aid them in burrowing, while those on the tail region are packed with noxious chemicals, similar to the poison glands found in other amphibians such as toads and newts.

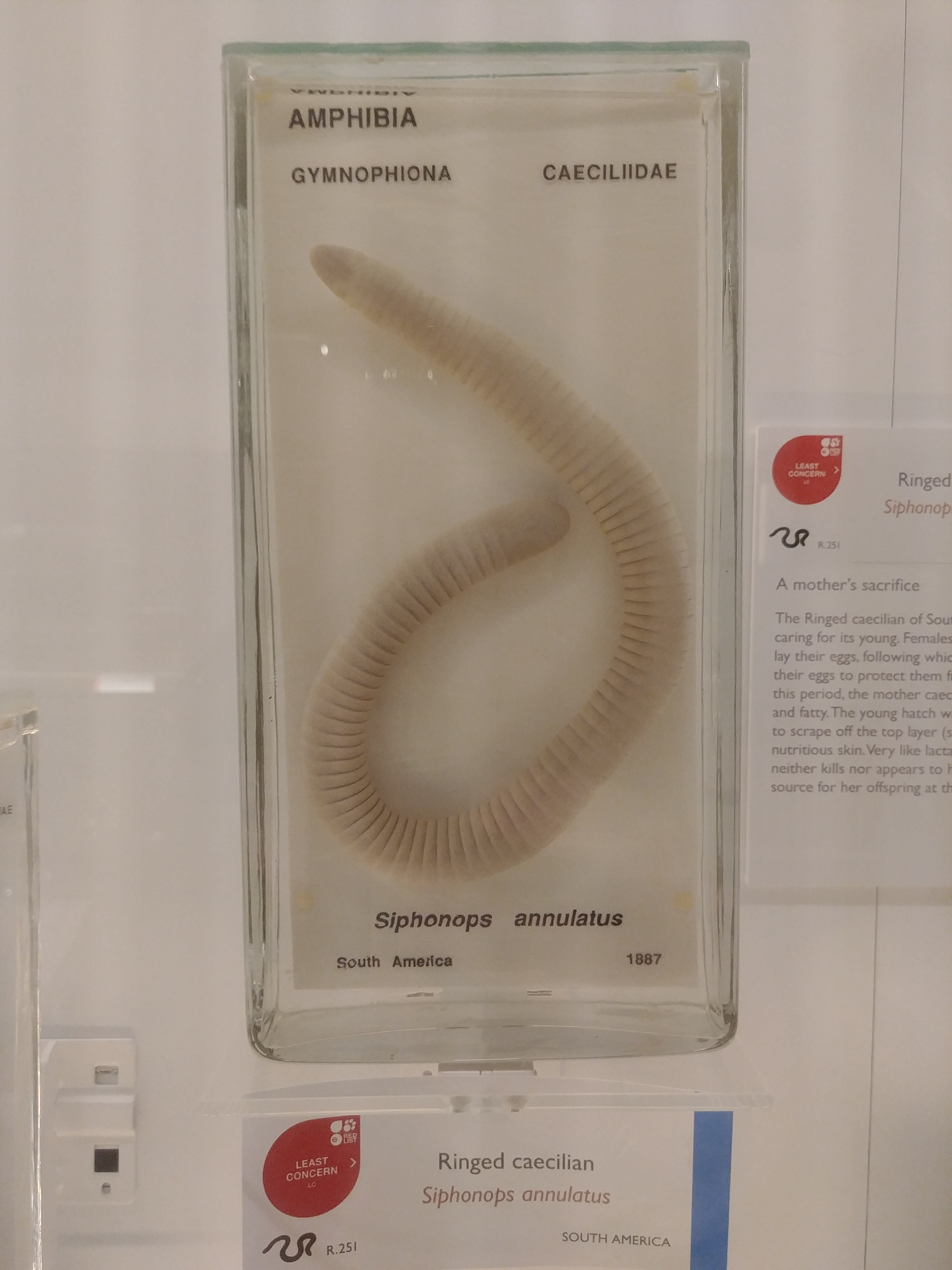
Siphonops annulatus, Ringed Caecilian, Zoology Museum, Cambridge

== Behavior ==
Caecilians are some of the least studied amphibians. Not much is known about their behavior and life history. Siphonops annulatus is highly fossorial, spending most of its life burrowed underground. A study found tunnels made by this species to go no deeper than 20 cm. This species uses a highly ossified skull to help burrow into the ground.

== Distribution and habitat ==
Widely distributed east of the Andes: originally discovered in Brazil, reported to exist in Argentina, Bolivia, Colombia, Ecuador, French Guiana, Guyana, Paraguay, Peru, Suriname, and Venezuela. Its natural habitats are subtropical or tropical moist lowland forest, dry savanna, moist savanna, subtropical or tropical moist shrubland, subtropical or tropical seasonally wet or flooded lowland grassland, pastureland, plantations, rural gardens, and heavily degraded former forest.

== Reproduction ==
Mating occurs between the end of August to the beginning of October. Oviposition occurs between November and December. Nestlings are equipped with 44 spoon-shaped teeth to feed on the outer layer of their mother's skin. Young feed all at once for some seven minutes; then they all rest for three days as the female grows a new outer skin layer. This phenomenon is known as maternal dermatophagy. This practice and morphological similarities are shared with its African relative Boulengerula taitana, suggesting it evolved over 100 million years ago.

As detailed in a 2024 study, researchers collected 16 mothers of the species from cacao plantations in Brazil's Atlantic Forest and filmed them with their altricial hatchlings in the lab. The mothers remained with their offspring, which suckled on a white, viscous liquid from their cloaca, experiencing rapid growth in their first week. This milk-like substance, rich in fats and carbohydrates, is produced in the mother's oviduct epithelium's hypertrophied glands, similar to mammal milk. The substance was released seemingly in response to tactile and acoustic stimulation by the babies. The researchers observed the hatchlings emitting high-pitched clicking sounds as they approached their mothers for milk, a behavior unique among amphibians. This milk-feeding behavior may contribute to the development of the hatchlings' microbiome and immune system, similar to mammalian young. The presence of milk production in caecilians that lay eggs suggests an evolutionary transition between egg-laying and live birth.
