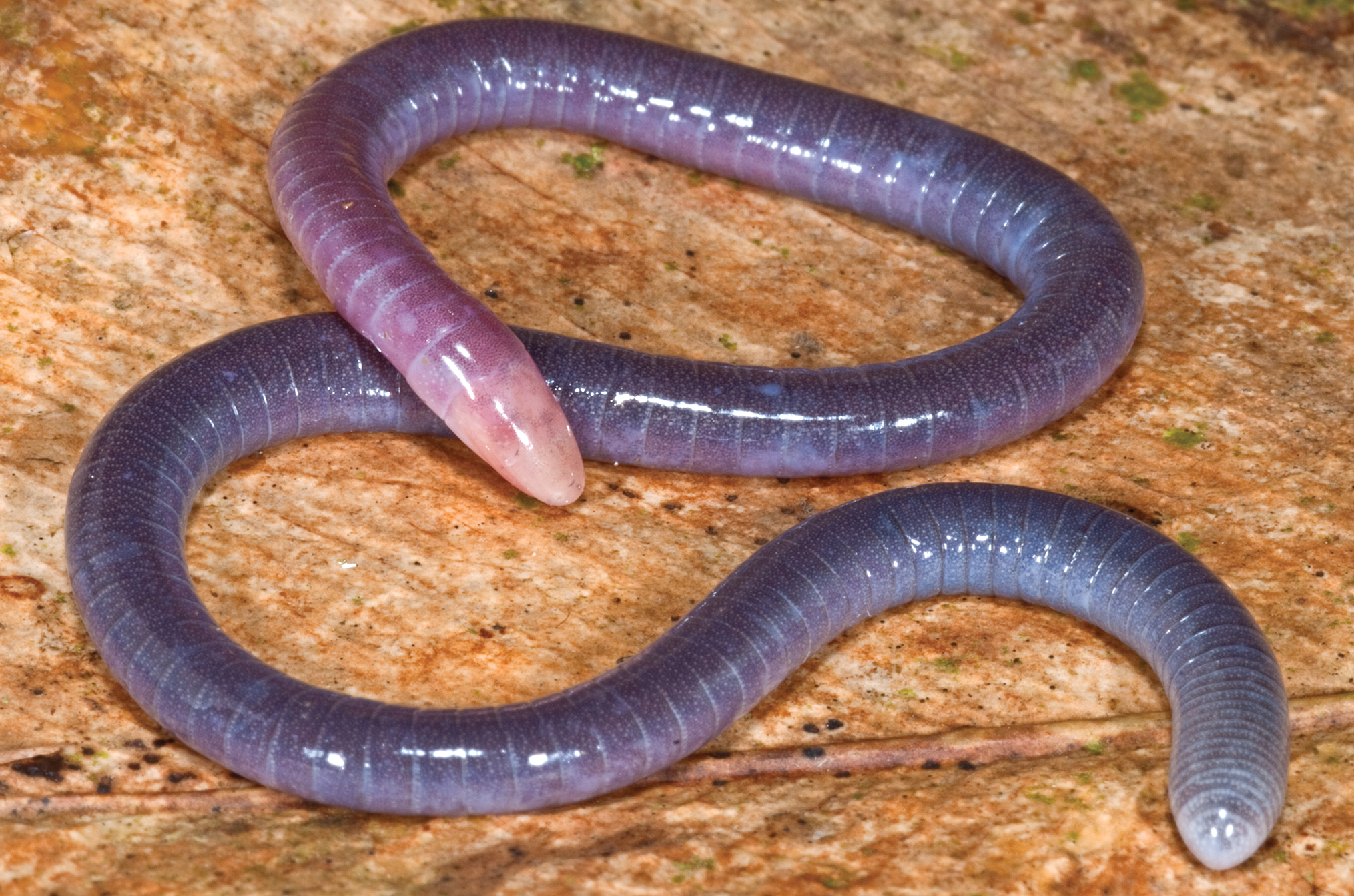
- Microcaecilia dermatophaga

Scientific classification
- Kingdom: Animalia
- Phylum: Chordata
- Class: Amphibia
- Order: Gymnophiona
- Clade: Apoda
- Family: Siphonopidae
- Genus: Microcaecilia; Taylor, 1968

Species
- See text

Synonyms
- Caecilita Wake and Donnelly, 2010; Parvicaecilia Taylor, 1968

= Microcaecilia =

Genus of amphibians

Microcaecilia is a genus of caecilians in the family Siphonopidae.

== Species ==
Species included (as of October 2019):

- Microcaecilia albiceps (Boulenger, 1882)
- Microcaecilia butantan Wilkinson, Antoniazzi, and Jared, 2015
- Microcaecilia dermatophaga Wilkinson, Sherratt, Starace, and Gower, 2013
- Microcaecilia grandis Wilkinson, Nussbaum, and Hoogmoed, 2010
- Microcaecilia iwokramae (Wake and Donnelly, 2010)
- Microcaecilia iyob Wilkinson and Kok, 2010
- Microcaecilia marvaleewakeae Maciel and Hoogmoed, 2013
- Microcaecilia nicefori (Barbour, 1924)
- Microcaecilia pricei (Dunn, 1944)
- Microcaecilia rabei (Roze and Solano, 1963)
- Microcaecilia rochai Maciel and Hoogmoed, 2011
- Microcaecilia savagei Donnelly and Wake, 2013
- Microcaecilia supernumeraria Taylor, 1969
- Microcaecilia taylori Nussbaum and Hoogmoed, 1979
- Microcaecilia trombetas Maciel and Hoogmoed, 2011
- Microcaecilia unicolor (Duméril, 1863)
