= Montenegro, Quindío =

Coordinates: 4°34.0284′N 75°45.0228′W

- Municipality and town
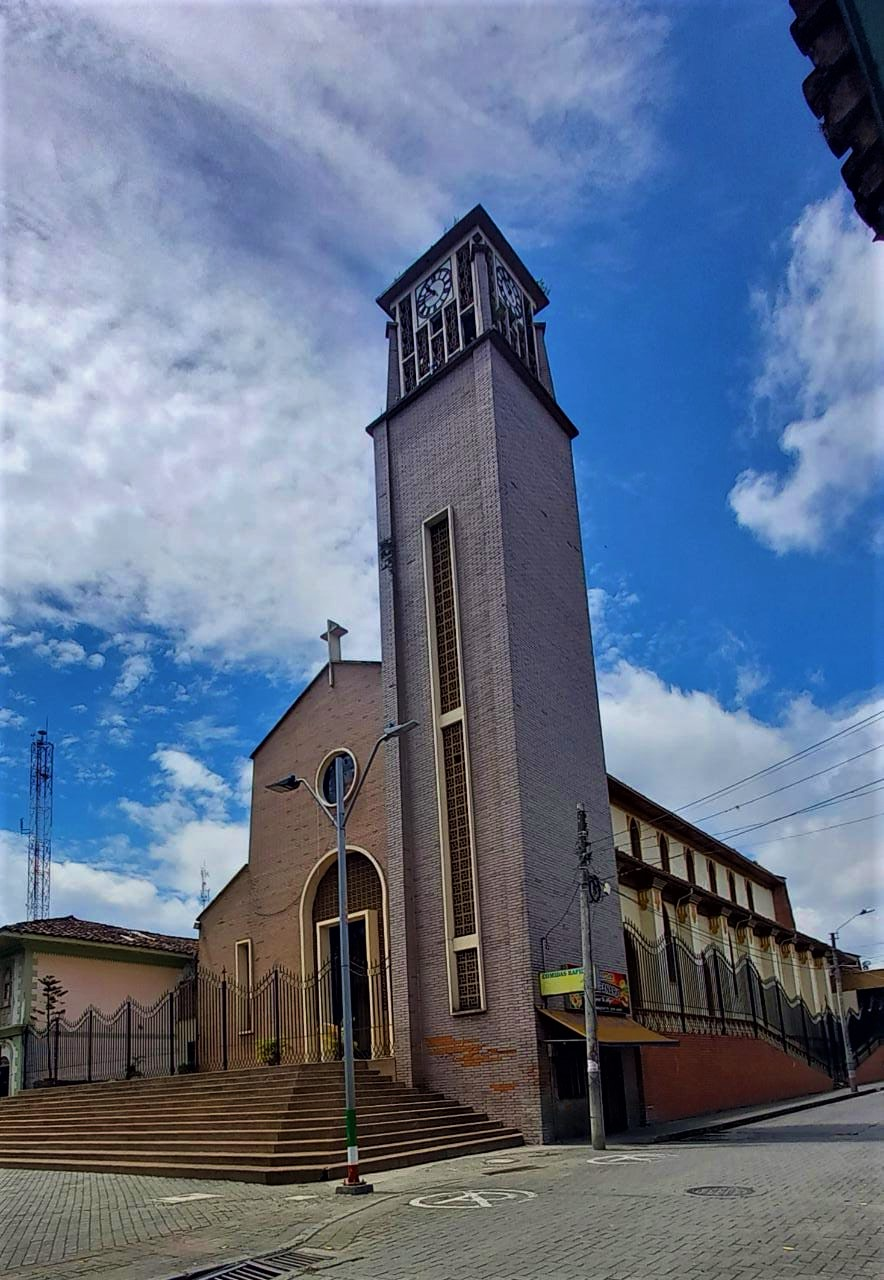
- Saint Joseph of Montenegro Parish

- Flag Coat of arms

- Location of the municipality and town of Montenegro, Quindío in the Quindío Department of Colombia.
- Country: Colombia
- Department: Quindío Department
- Elevation: 1,294 m (4,245 ft)

Population (2023)
  - Total: 38,240
- Time zone: UTC-5 (Colombia Standard Time)

Montenegro (Spanish pronunciation: [monteˈneɣɾo]) is a municipality in the western part of the department of Quindío, Colombia. It is located 10 km west of the departmental capital Armenia. In 2023 it had an estimated population of 38,240.

== History and geographic information ==
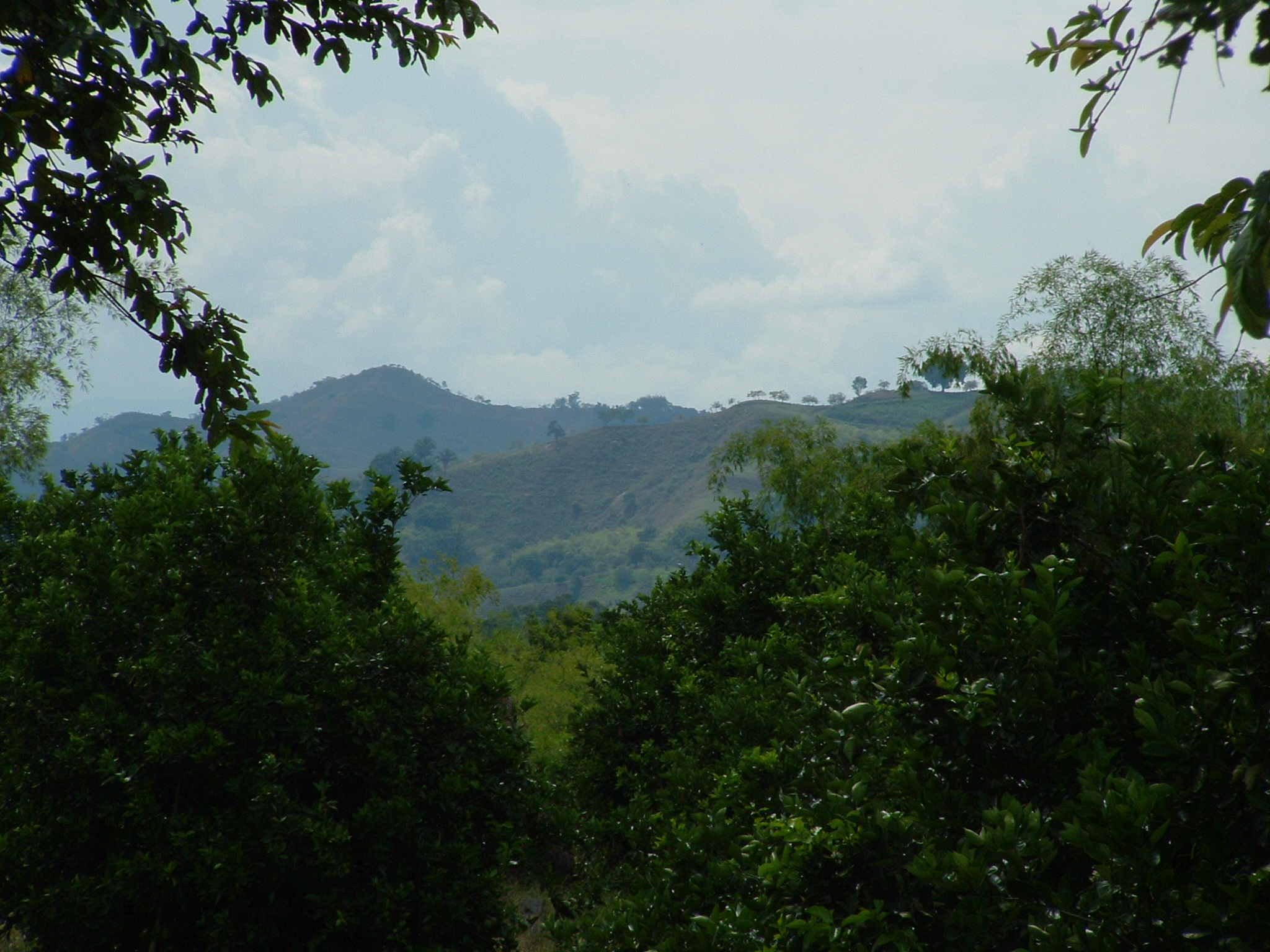
The Colombian Cordillera near Montenegro is world-famous for its rich-flavoured coffee.

Montenegro (literally: Black Mountain) was named for the dark green color of the trees that originally covered the hill above the current-day site of the township, which was visible from other parts of the region as it rose above the surrounding guadua forests. Between 1897 and 1904, Montenegro was officially known as Villa Quindío.

The boundaries of Montenegro are principally formed by three rivers. To the north, the Roble River forms the limit with Quimbaya; to the east and south, the Espejo River forms the limit with Armenia and La Tebaida; and to the west La Vieja River is the limit with the neighboring department of Valle del Cauca. There is also a short boundary with Circasia in the northeast of the municipality.

Located in the heart of the Colombian coffee growing axis, the center of Montenegro was made part of the "Coffee Cultural Landscape" UNESCO World Heritage Site in 2011. Montenegro is also home to the National Coffee Park. Founded by the Colombian Coffee Federation, the park hosts numerous thematic attractions based on Colombian history and the country's thriving coffee culture. The rural landscape of Montenegro is typical of the coffee zone, and the hotel and posadas infrastructure has increased dramatically in the 2000-2005 period. It is an important tourism and convention destination for a relaxed vacation featuring nature-watching and cultural trips (related to the coffee-growing techniques).

=== Climate ===
Montenegro has a subtropical highland climate with an average annual temperature of 21 °C.

== Touristic sites ==
- Coffee Park (Parque del Café): It consists of two main areas: by the main entrance are the buildings housing the museum and exhibitions detailing the history, culture and process of growing and producing coffee in the region; and in the valley beyond is an amusement park with rides and shows. The two areas are linked by two gondola lifts and a chairlift: it is also possible to walk between the two areas via an ecological trail that passes through a plantation of many varieties of coffee bushes.

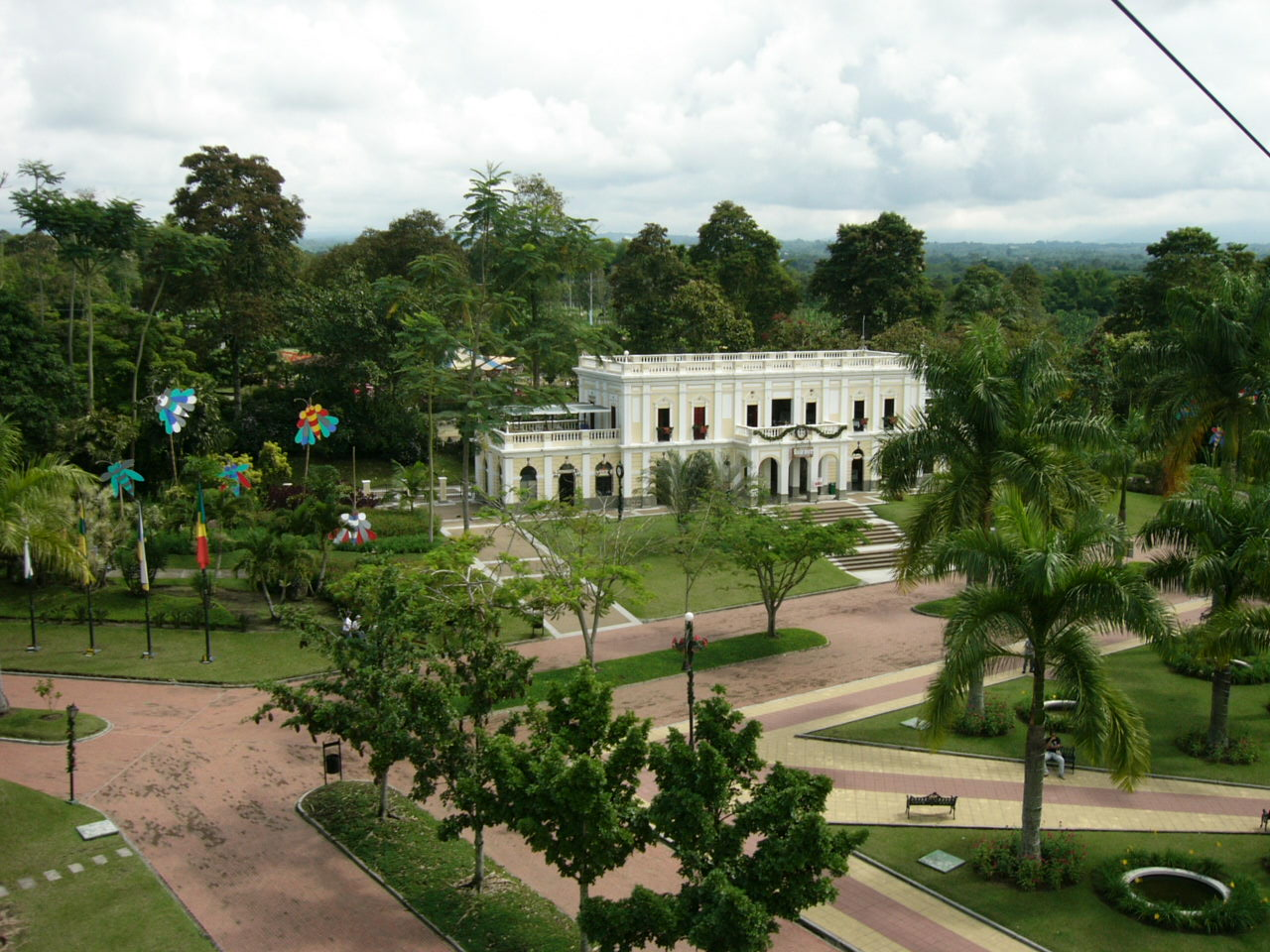
(Parque del Café)

== History ==
The first people to arrive in Montenegro in the modern era were treasure hunters (Spanish: guaqueros), attracted by reports of gold artefacts in indigenous burial sites in the area. In the 1880s more than 1,500 people arrived from as far away as Antioquia in search of treasure. One of the earliest settlers was María Antonia "Toñíta" Granada, a widow originally from Pácora, Caldas. In 1884 she built a house in what is now the center of the township, close to the River Roble. She became the first woman registered as a founder of a town in Quindío.

Miguel Duque Betancourt bought the land for the township for a price of 300 pesos, from Agapito Herrera, the municipal judge in Salento. Along with his parents, Duque had arrived in the area from Salamina, Caldas. They settled in what would later become the vereda La Esmeralda.

Although he was only 25 years old, Duque became the president of the municipal council, which met for the first time on October 17, 1890. This date is now considered the foundation date for Montenegro. Seven years later, on September 10, 1897, Montenegro was recognized as a town (corregimiento) of the municipality of Filandia. It became a separate municipality on April 6, 1911.
