= Salento, Quindío =

Coordinates: 4°38′N 75°34′W

Salento
- Municipality and town
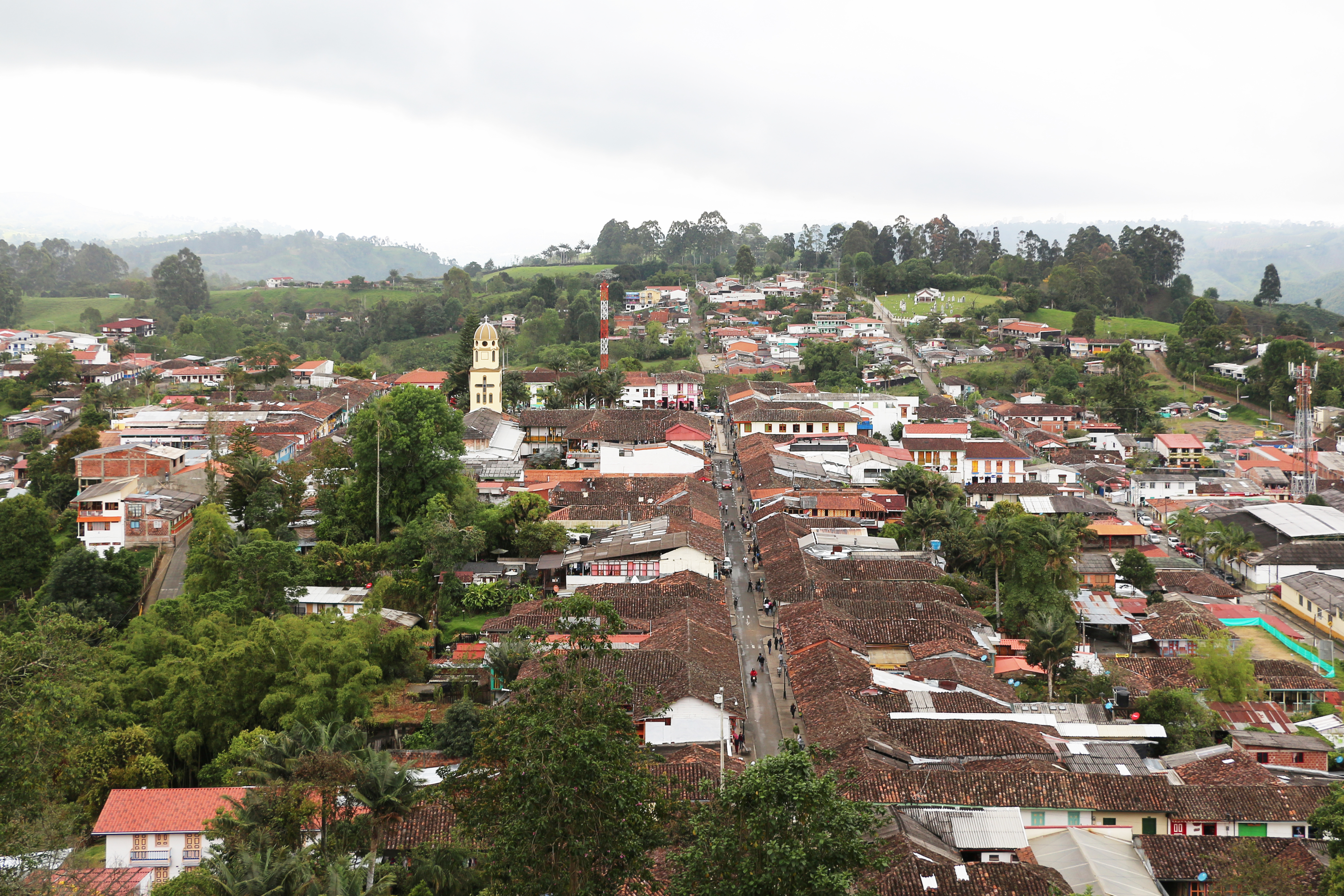

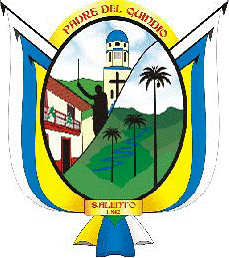
- Flag Coat of arms
- Nickname: "El Padre del Quindío" ("The Father of Quindío")
- Location map of the municipality and town of Salento in the Department of Quindío.
- Country: Colombia
- Founded: 5 January 1842
- Named for: ,

Area
  - Municipality and town: 377.67 km^{2} (145.82 sq mi)
  - Urban: 0.55 km^{2} (0.21 sq mi)
- Elevation: 1,895 m (6,217 ft)

Population (2023)
  - Municipality and town: 9,748
- Time zone: UTC-5 (GMT-5)
- Website: http://www.salento-quindio.gov.co

Salento is a town and municipality in the north-east of the department of Quindío, Colombia. The municipality covers an area of 377.67 km^{2}. It was the first settlement in Quindío of the modern era, and the first municipality founded in the department. The town of Salento itself is located 24 km northeast of the departmental capital Armenia. In 2023, the municipality of Salento had an estimated population of 9,748. It has a wide variety of tourist attractions, including the Cocora Valley, where one can find a landscape full of nature, such as the Barranquero or Momotus aequatorialis, a commonly seen bird, take ecological walks and enjoy the landscapes of this town.

The main route from Popayán and Cali to Bogotá used to pass through Salento, but when the route was diverted, the town became isolated and did not develop as rapidly as the rest of the region. For this reason, it has retained more of its traditional colonial architecture than almost any other town in the eje cafetero, along with a quiet and relaxed way of life, and as a result, the town and nearby Cocora valley are among the most popular tourist destinations in Colombia. The historic center of town was inscribed on the UNESCO World Heritage List as part of the "Coffee Cultural Landscape" in 2011.

== History ==
In the colonial era, the main route from Popayán to Bogotá traveled over the Quindío Pass (a.k.a. "La Línea"), passing through the modern-day site of Salento. In 1830 Simón Bolívar traveled the route and ordered that it be upgraded due to its poor condition and strategic importance. However, the town was not established until 5 January 1842, after the Guerra de los Supremos. Political prisoners from that war were sent from Panama, Antioquia and Cauca to upgrade and maintain the road. After completing their sentences they were given a plot of land in the region.

The site of the penal colony was known as Barcinales, located where Salento is today. However, the main settlement was in the valley in Boquía, where the Boquía stream joins the Quindío river. Families of the prisoners arrived and built their houses in Boquía and established farms upstream in the Cocora valley.

Sometime around 1854 a flood of the Quindío river destroyed the settlement of Boquía, and the survivors rebuilt their houses in Barcinales. They retained the name Boquía for the new settlement, changing the name of the original settlement to Pueblo Viejo.

In 1864 a census of the new Boquía showed that it had 581 inhabitants. The occupational breakdown comprised 148 farmers, 2 carpenters, 1 blacksmith, 11 doctors, 1 lawyer, 2 tailors, 4 laborers, 11 merchants and 11 watchmakers.

In 1865 Boquía was officially declared a municipality and its name was changed again to Villa de Nueva Salento, and the name of Boquía reverted to the original settlement in the valley. The new name of the municipality was given in honor of Salento, a region in the south of Italy.

== Geography ==
The municipality of Salento is located in the north-eastern corner of the department of Quindío. It borders the municipalities of Filandia and Circasia to the west, Armenia and Calarcá to the south-west, the department of Tolima to the east, and the department of Risaralda to the north. Its geography is varied, rising from around 1300 m in the fertile valleys of the west of the municipality to the permanently snow-capped summit of the Nevado del Quindío, which at 4750 m is the highest point of the department of Quindío.

The town of Salento itself lies on a plateau above the Quindío river valley. The section of the river valley from Salento to the head of the river is known as the Cocora valley. The town is located at an average altitude of 1895 meters above sea level, with steep drops to the valley floor at its northern and western perimeters.

=== Climate ===
Due to its altitude and proximity to the high mountains of the Central Cordillera, Salento's climate is subtropical highland. The average annual temperature of the town is 17 °C.

== Tourist attractions ==
The town is one of the major tourist attractions of Colombia, thanks to its peaceful nature (although it fills up with tourists at weekends and on bank holidays), impressive scenery, easy access to the Cocora valley, and the retention of much of its original bahareque architecture typical of the eje cafetero region. This style of architecture is especially notable on Carrera 6, a.k.a. Calle Real (English: Royal Road), the road that leads north-east from the town square to a mirador (look-out point), the Alto de la Cruz. The road is the major thoroughfare of Salento and contains many shops, mainly selling locally made handcrafts.

The Alto de la Cruz is reached from the end of Calle Real via 250 steps marked with the fourteen Stations of the Cross spaced at intervals along the way. An alternative, less direct route to the mirador by road avoids the steps. From the mirador there are extensive views of the Cocora valley and many of the mountains of the Los Nevados National Natural Park.

The restaurants, particularly those in the town square, specialize in freshwater trout (farmed locally further up the Cocora valley) cooked in a variety of sauces and served on a large patacon, a fritter of green plantain.

Salento is the starting point for excursions into the Cocora valley and hiking in the Los Nevados National Natural Park: jeep taxis leave from the town square and travel 11 km up the valley to the settlement of "Cocora", from where the valley may be explored on foot or on horseback via numerous trails.

The town's festival takes place each year in the first week of January, to coincide with the celebrations of the anniversary of the town's foundation on 5 January.

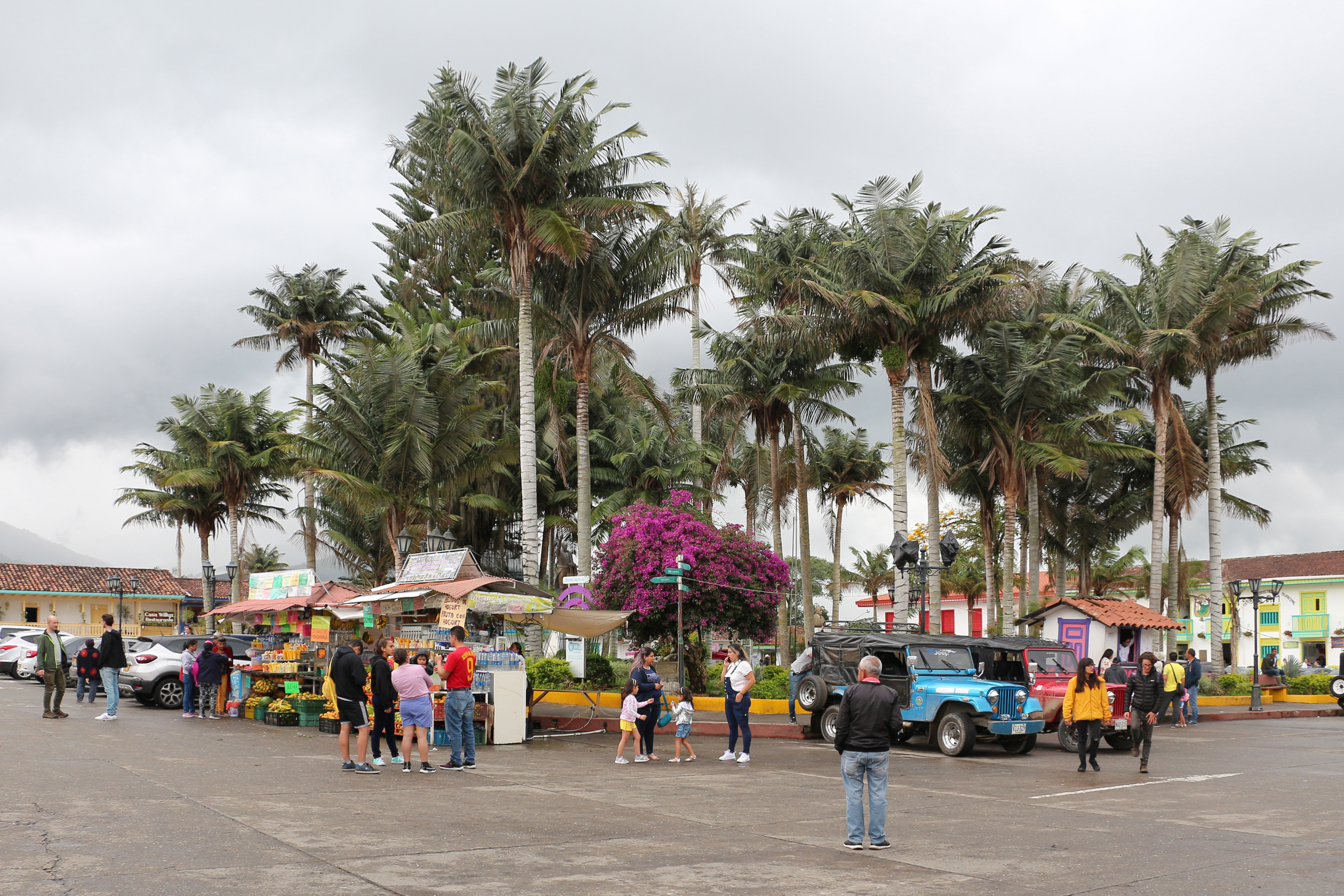
Plaza de Bolívar

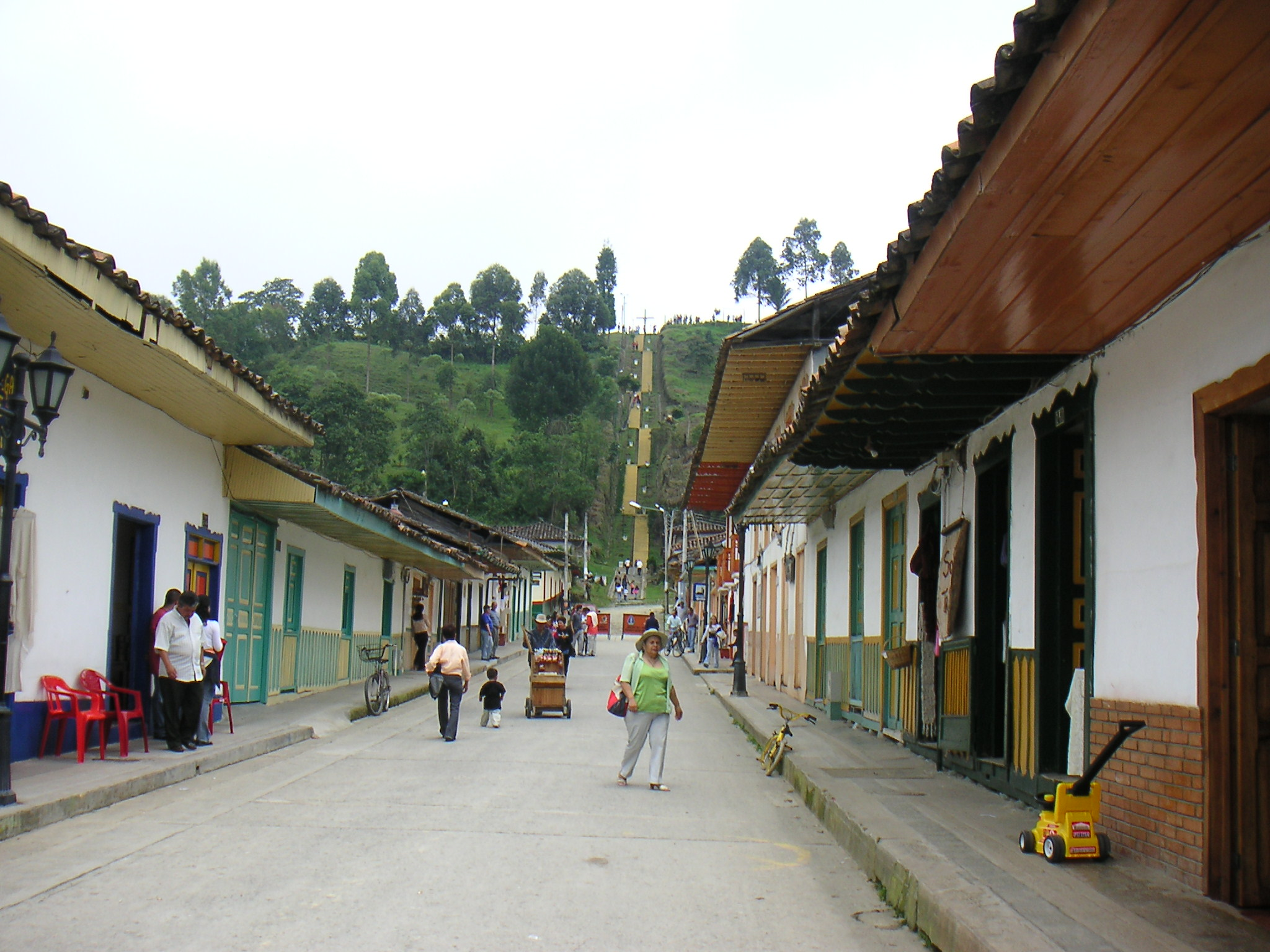
Calle Real

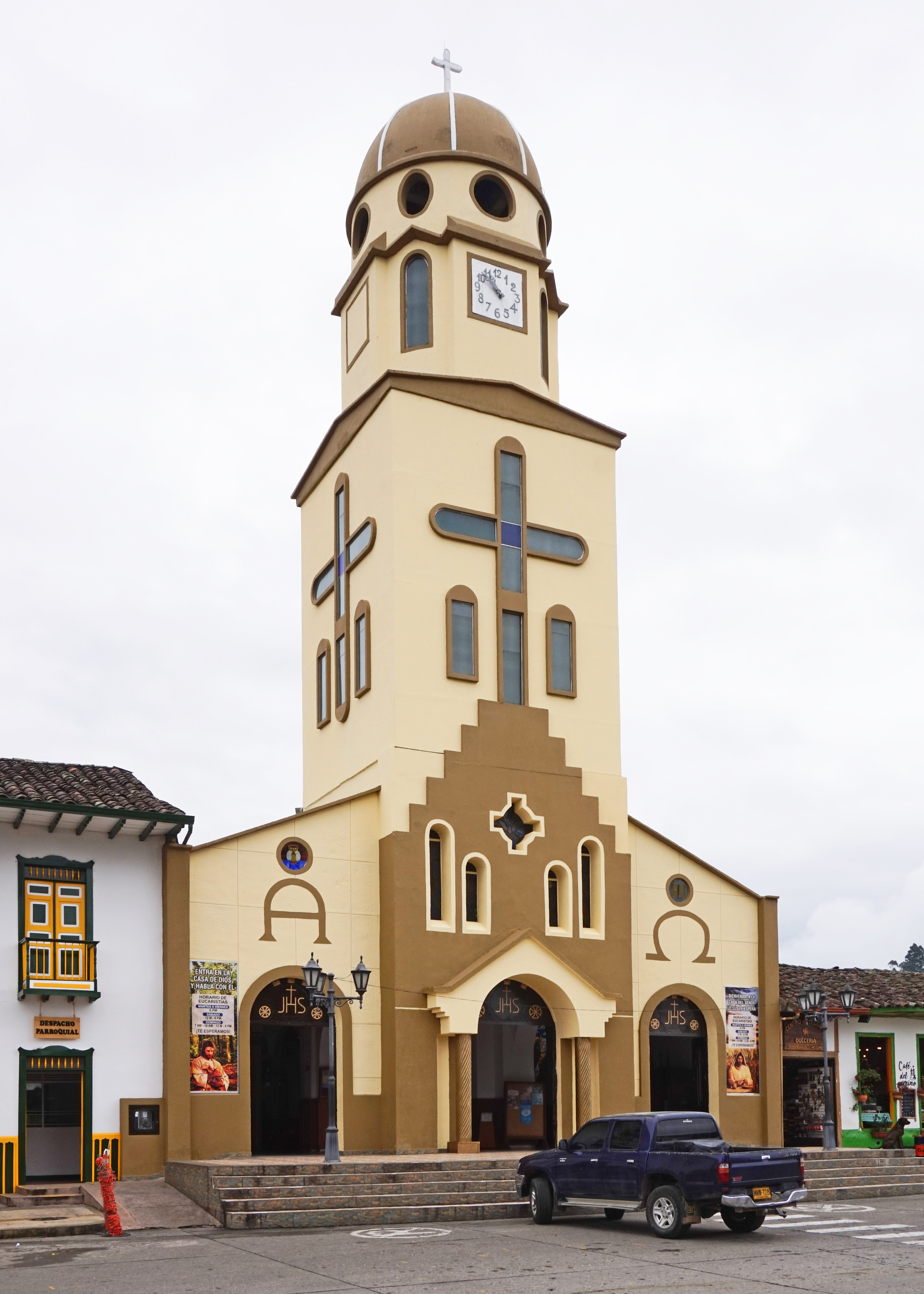
Church of Nuestra Señora del Carmen

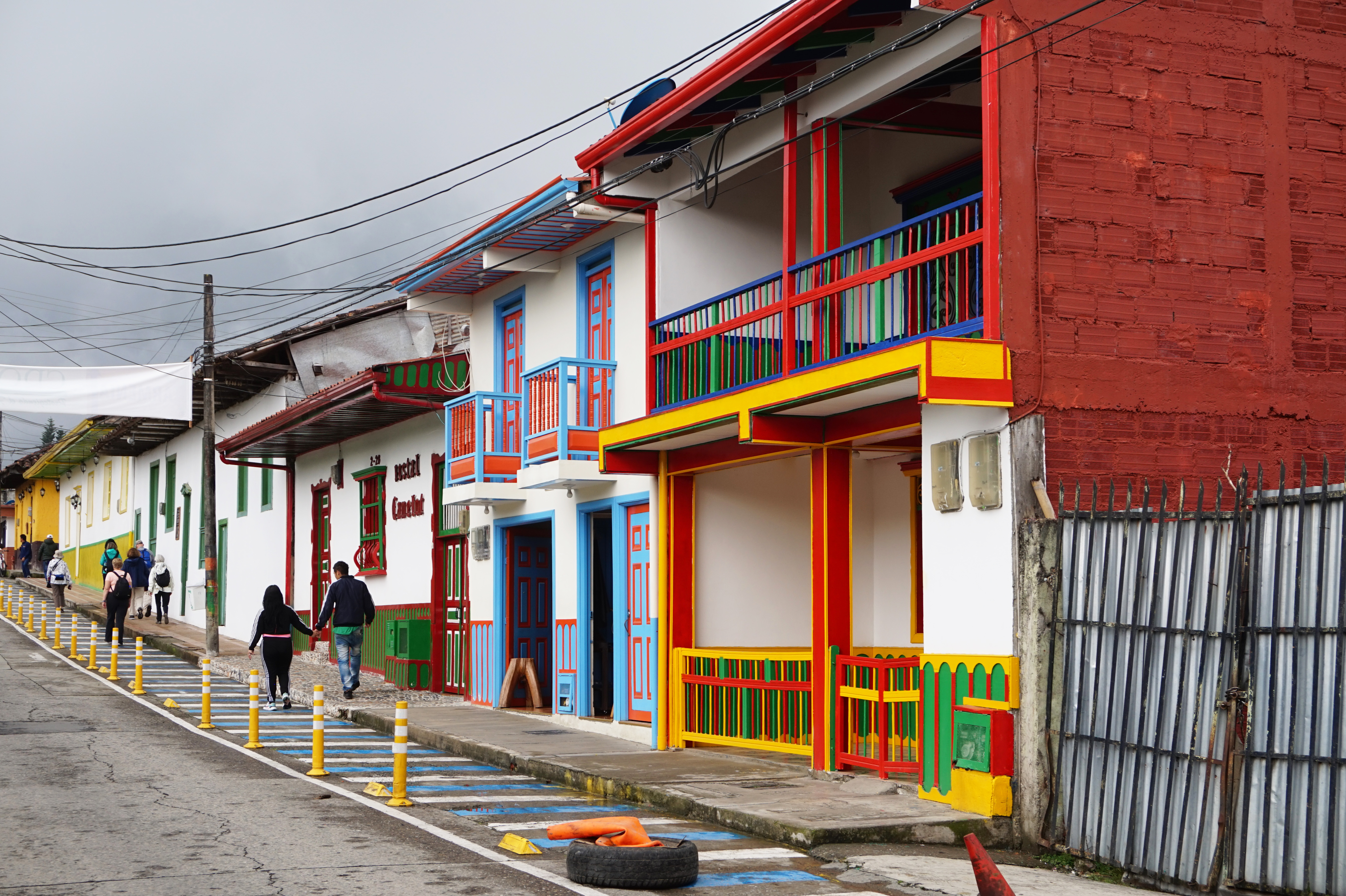
Street of Salento

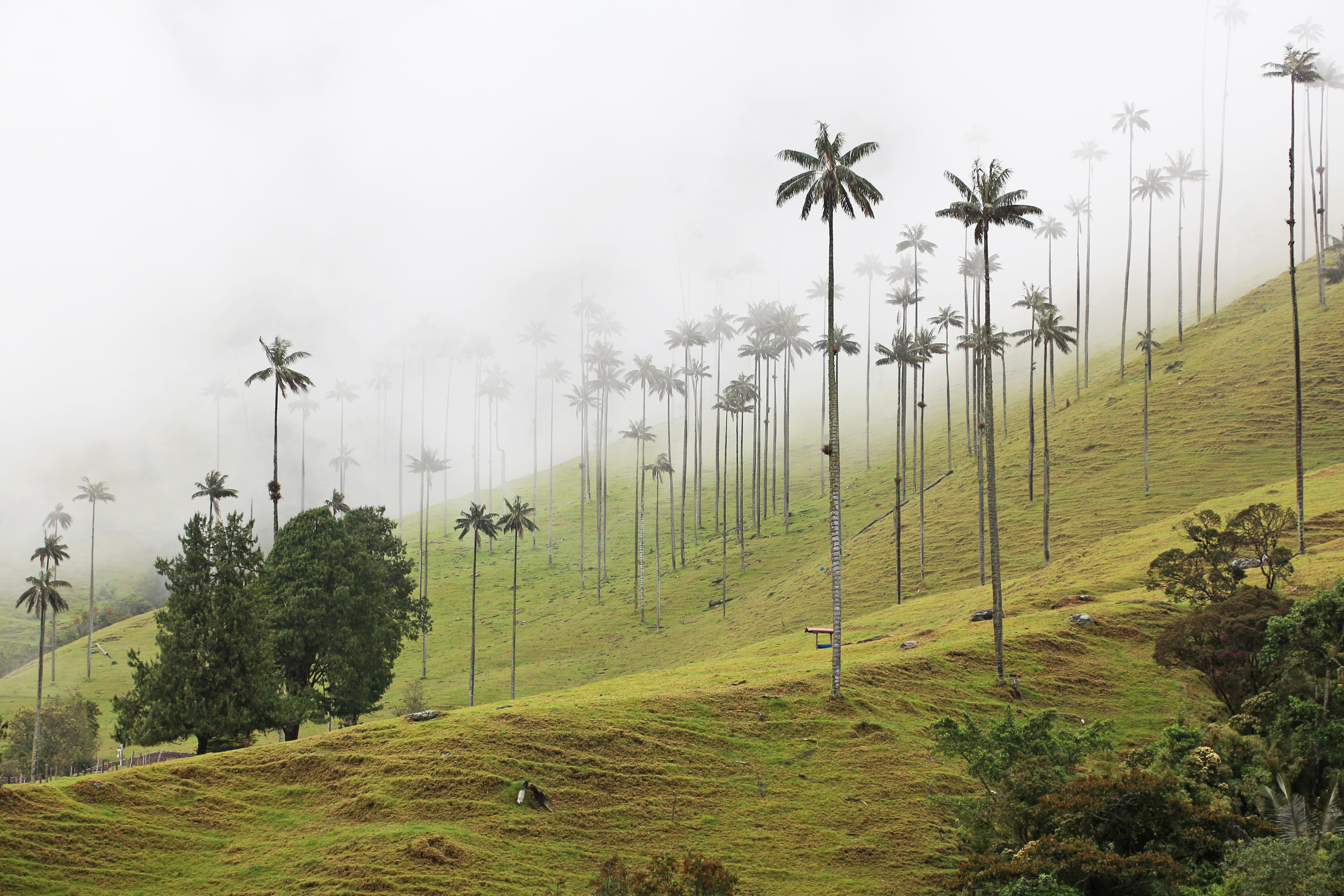
Cocora Valley

== Economy ==
Tourism is the dominant economy of the town, but outside the urban area farming and agriculture is still important, with dairy farming and the production of coffee and flowers among other crops.
