= Colombian coffee growing axis =

Region of Colombia known for growing coffee

Coffee Axis (Spanish: Eje Cafetero)

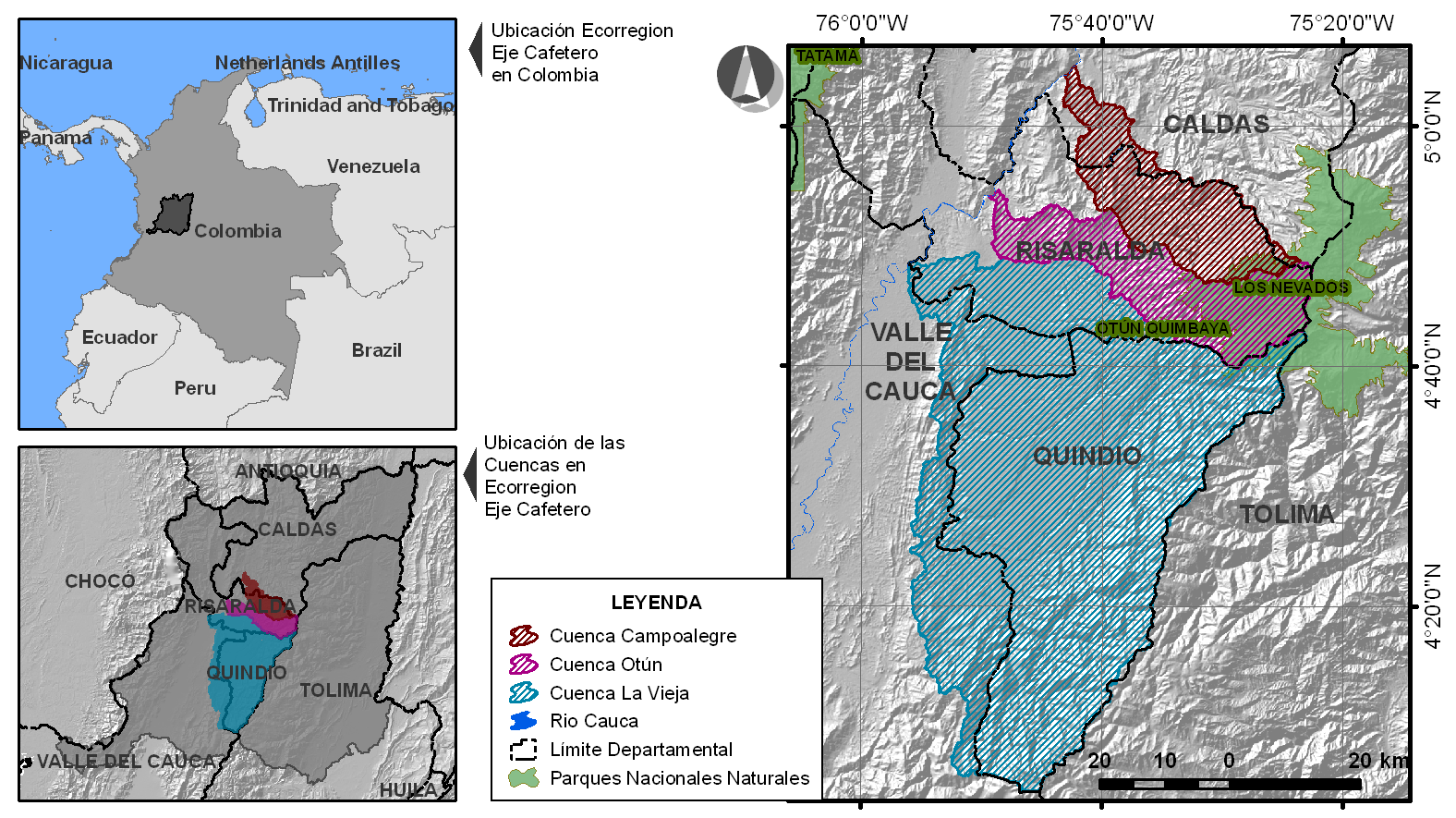
Coffee Triangle (Spanish: Triángulo del Café)

The Coffee Axis (Spanish: Eje Cafetero) is a geographic, cultural, economic and ecological region of Colombia, located in the departments of Caldas, Risaralda and Quindío, as well as the regions of northwestern Tolima, northern and eastern Valle del Cauca and southwestern Antioquia, including the capital cities of the first four departments mentioned (Manizales, Pereira, Armenia and Ibagué, respectively).

== History of coffee ==
Coffee was first grown commercially in Colombia in Salazar de las Palmas, north of Santander, and over the twentieth century grew to be Colombia's primary export. When coffee was first brought into the country, the leaders tried to push the farming of coffee beans, but was met with resistance from the people because it takes about 5 years until the first harvest of the bean. In 1999, coffee revenues represented 3.7% of gross domestic product (gdp) and 37% of agricultural employment. The main coffee-producing departments are: Nariño, Norte de Santander, Antioquia, Valle del Cauca, Huila, Tolima, Caldas, Risaralda, Quindio and Cundinamarca.

The area between the departments of Caldas, Risaralda, Quindío and Tolima is known as the Coffee Zone because of the large development experienced by the cultivation of this product. This region was strongly affected by an earthquake that was 6.4 on the Richter scale on January 25, 1999, but subsequently the region's economy recovered rapidly.

== Overview ==
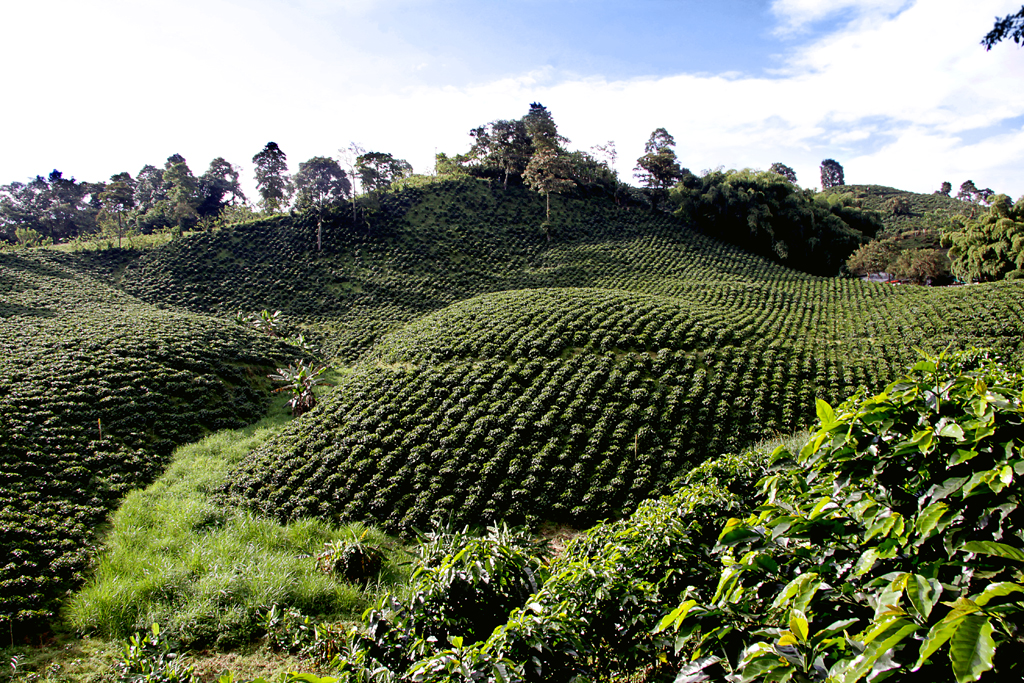
Coffee farms.

Weather conditions (8 °C to 24 °C), geography (Andean Rainforest) and the geological region, determine the production of high quality coffee, with relatively short harvest periods. Farmers in the area have developed techniques for growing, harvesting and processing of grain, and all done "grain by grain", and have retained this form of processing industry despite new techniques of mass agricultural industrialization.

The advertising icon "Juan Valdez", represented by a Paisa farmer wearing a carriel, aguadeño hat and poncho, and accompanied by a mule, is widely recognized in advertising. In a 2005 survey, Juan Valdez was identified as the advertising image with the greatest recall in United States.

== Coffee Cultural Landscape World Heritage Site ==
Coffee Cultural Landscape of Colombia
UNESCO World Heritage Site
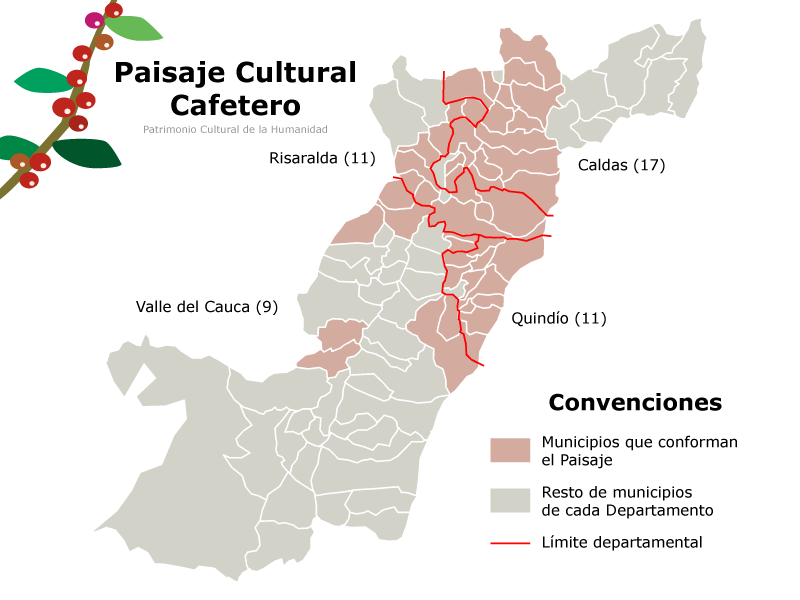

- Location within Colombia
- Location: Colombia
- Includes: Six zones (A to F)
- Criteria: Cultural: (v), (vi)
- Reference: 1121
- Inscription: 2011 (35th Session)
- Area: 141,120 ha (348,700 acres)
- Buffer zone: 207,000 ha (510,000 acres)
- Coordinates: 5°28′18″N 75°40′54″W

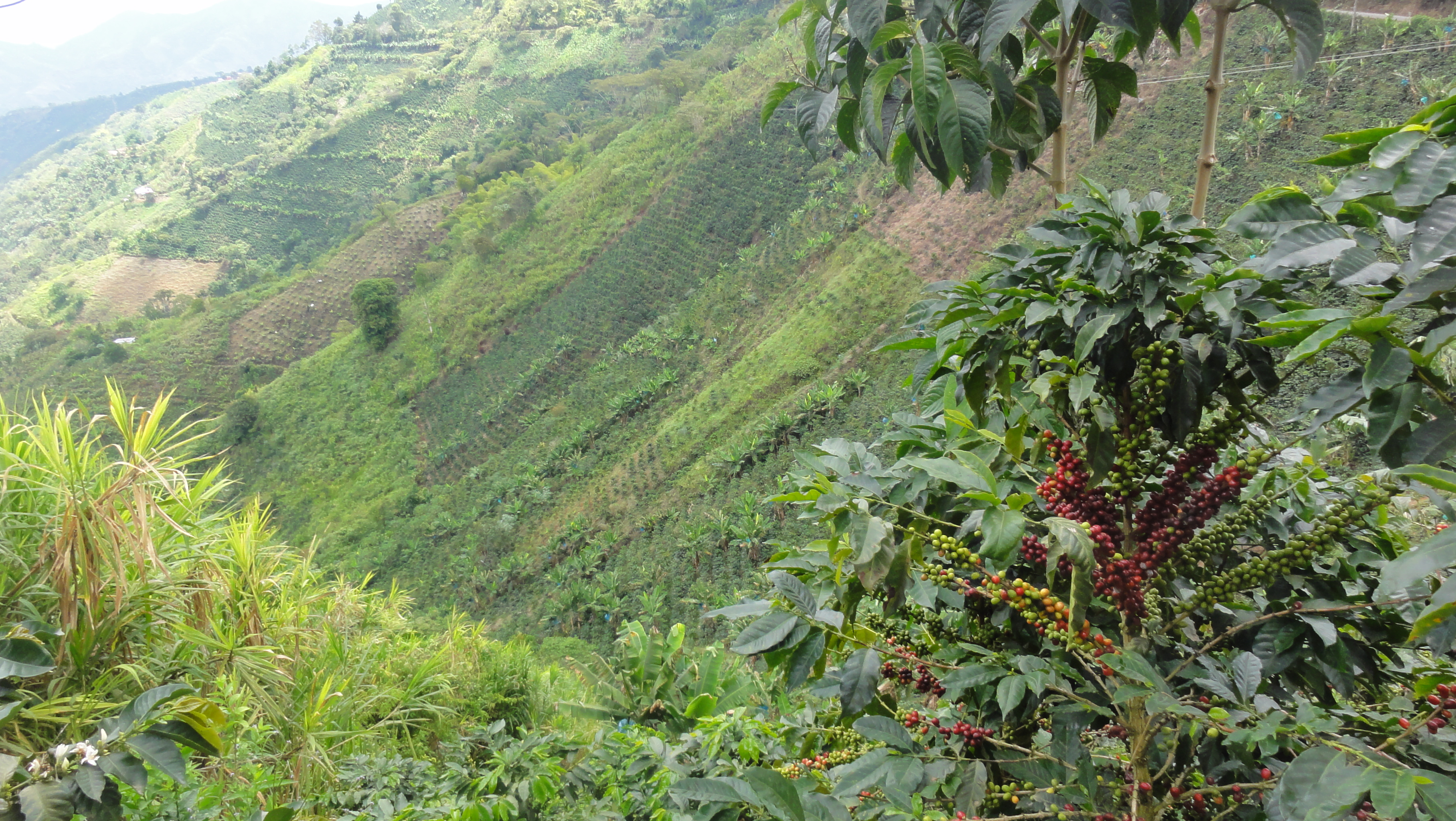
The main line of the economy in the Coffee Cultural Landscape is the production of Coffee.

Eighteen urban settlements across six sites within the coffee axis and extending southwards into the Valle del Cauca department were inscribed on the UNESCO World Heritage List in 2011 as the Coffee Cultural Landscape. These sites are representative of the entire coffee axis, preserving multiple different forms of traditional coffee growing, in addition to the culture of the region and the locations of several unique festivals. The World Heritage site is composed of many of the urban centers within the region, including Armenia, Calarcá, Salamina, Pereira, and Riosucio, as well as smaller towns and the surrounding rural coffee farmlands.

== Tourist attractions ==
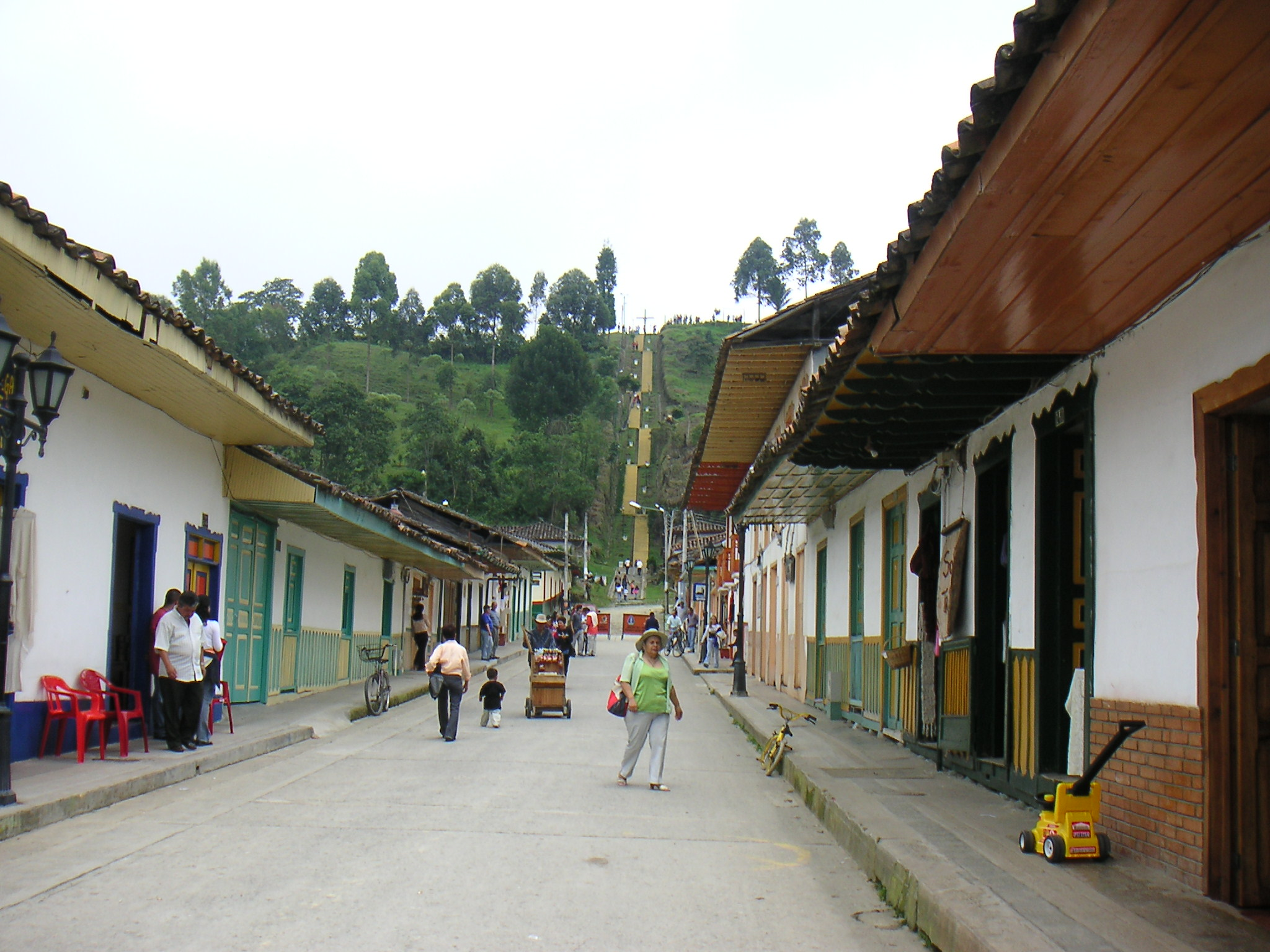
Salento, Quindío, a small town in rural Colombia, has become one of the top tourist destinations in the coffee-Growers Axis.

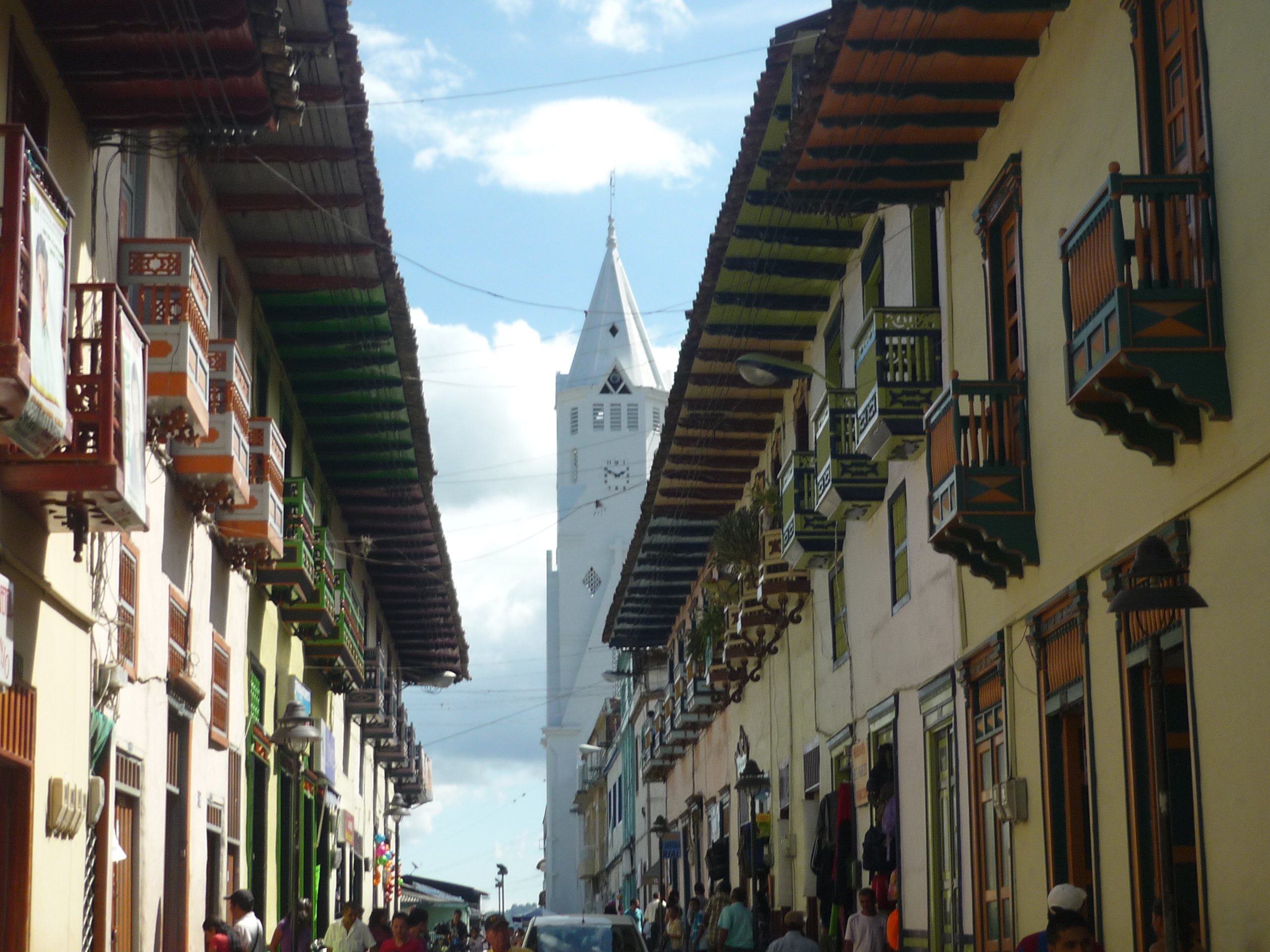
Balconies in the street Real in Santuario, Risaralda.

The region has developed major theme parks such as the Colombian National Coffee Park located in the town of Montenegro in Quindio. In the area is also the Museum of Culture Coffee, showing the process from grain production to savoring a traditional Colombian coffee. This museum, like all the other theme parks, are replicas of the colonial city, where tourists enjoy dance performances and traditional music, panoramic views from cable car with its lush landscape, and various rides.

Another unique theme park in Colombia is the National Park of Culture Agriculture - Panaca, located in the Municipality of Quimbaya in Quindio. Its key feature is that, unlike zoos, visitors are immersed in personal and direct contact with farm animals and also enjoy scheduled activities and events with those animals.

Other attractions in the area include:

- Botanical Garden of the University of Pereira as one of the largest in Colombia as the only listed by the BGCI as natural or Sivestre, but also for being known for its orchid.
- Santuario is one of the most characteristic towns of the region, is known for its tradition paisa's architecture and streets. It is close to PNN Tatamá.
- Thermal Santa Rosa de Cabal, a spa for bathing in hot springs and different activities for relaxation and body care.
- Rafting on the Rio la Vieja: Walking the Rio La Vieja on the border between the departments of Valle del Cauca and Quindío, from the town of Quimbaya
- Cocora Valley in Salento, home of the national tree Palma wax Quindío one of the most beautiful spots around the axis coffee one of the entry points to Los Nevados National Natural Park where there are also entitled to stay and camp sites.
- Quindío Botanical Gardens, located in the town of Calarcá, where you can also see in the butterfly with the largest exhibition of butterflies in the country.

== Main urban centers ==
- Manizales, Caldas Department
- Pereira, Risaralda Department
- Armenia, Quindío Department
- Ibagué, Tolima Department

== Tourism ==
- Colombian National Coffee Park Montenegro
- Nevado del Ruiz. Manizales
- PANACA Parque
- Cocora Valley, Salento. Quindío
- Matecaña City Zoo

Tourist excursions offer trekking to some of Colombia's top coffee cultivating land as well as the country's native palm tree - the Wax Palm, which grows up to 60 metres tall.

== Gallery Colombian National Coffee Park ==
Known as Colombian National Coffee Park

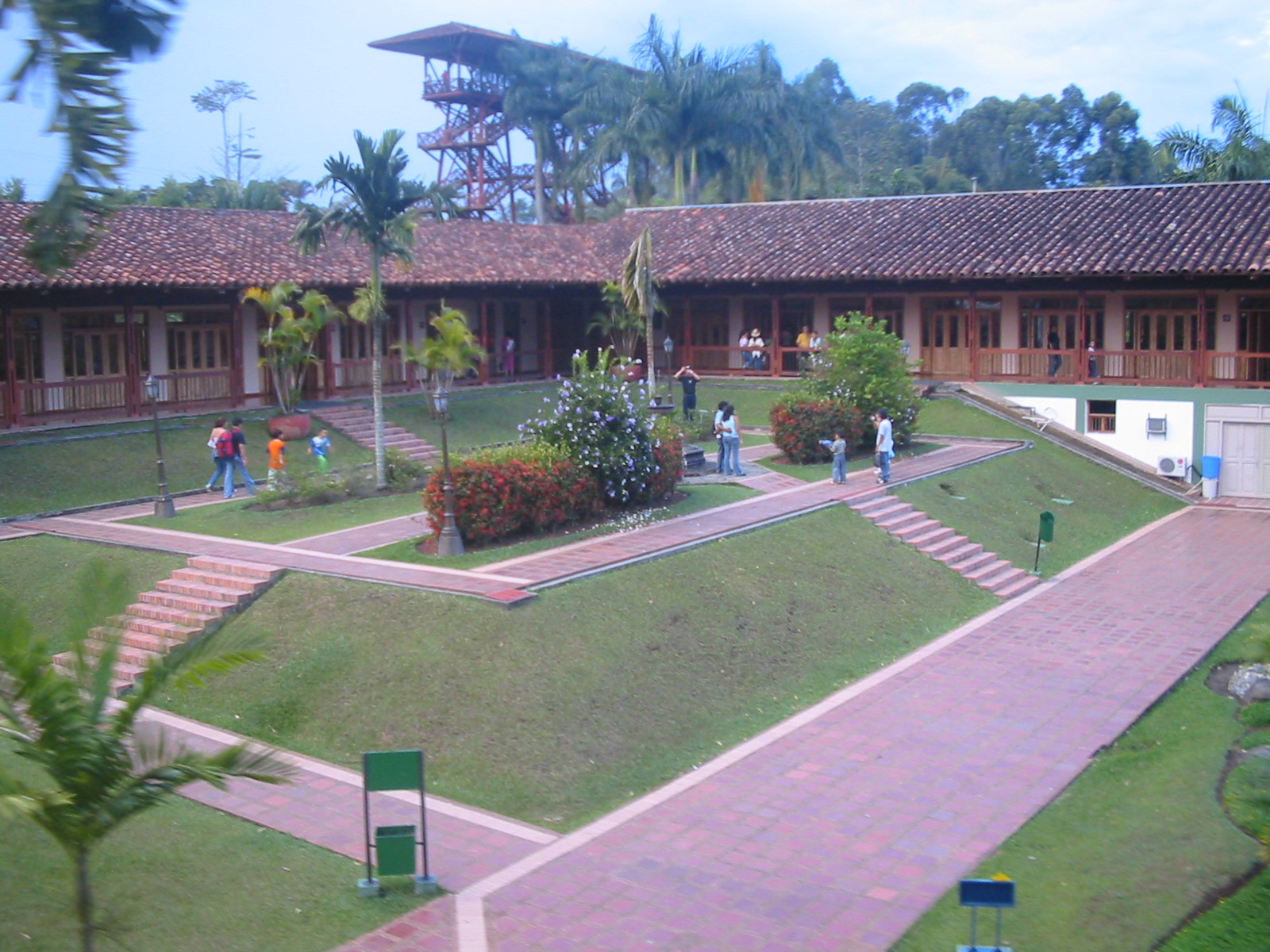
Coffee process museum

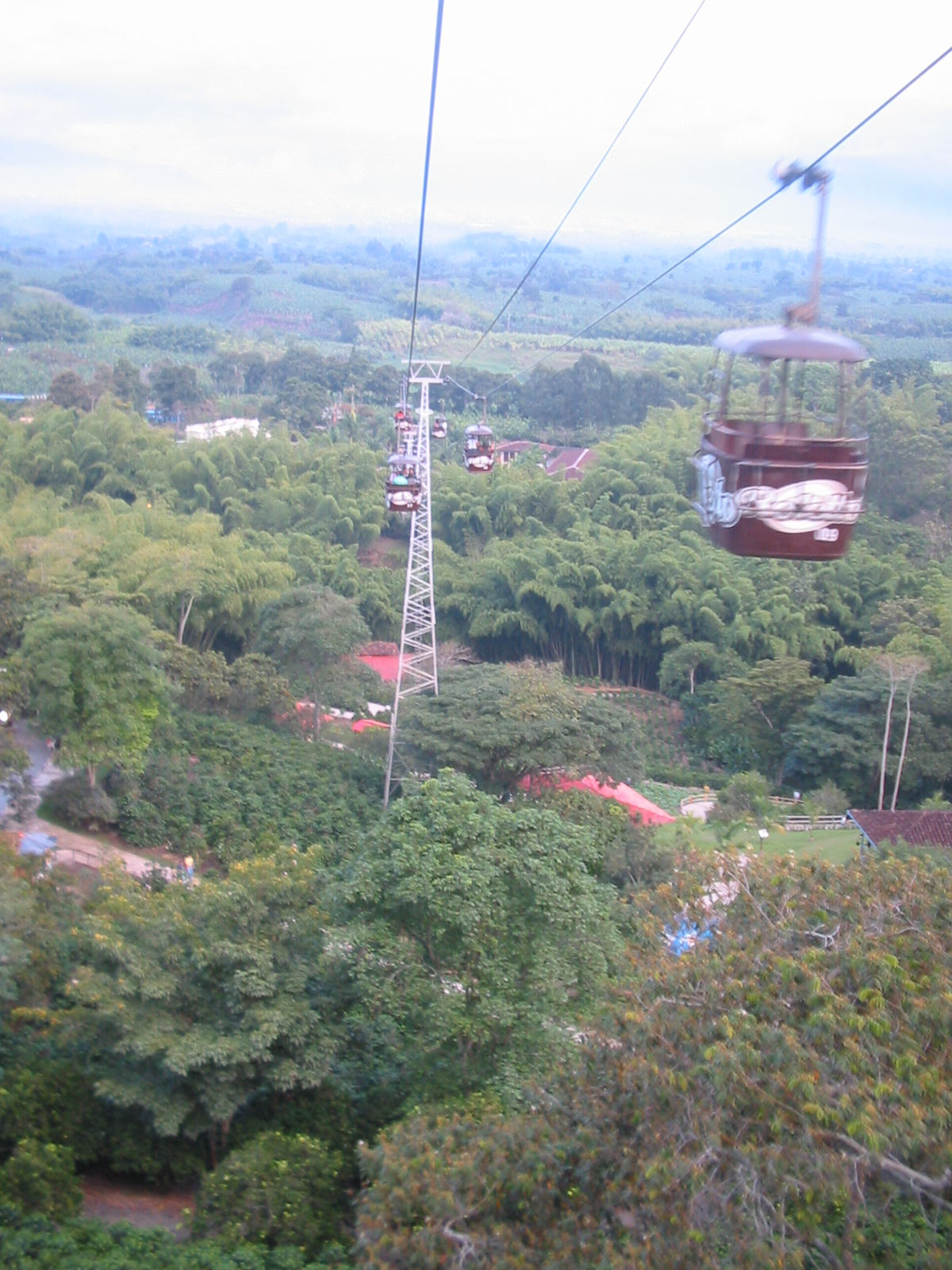
Panoramic gondola lift

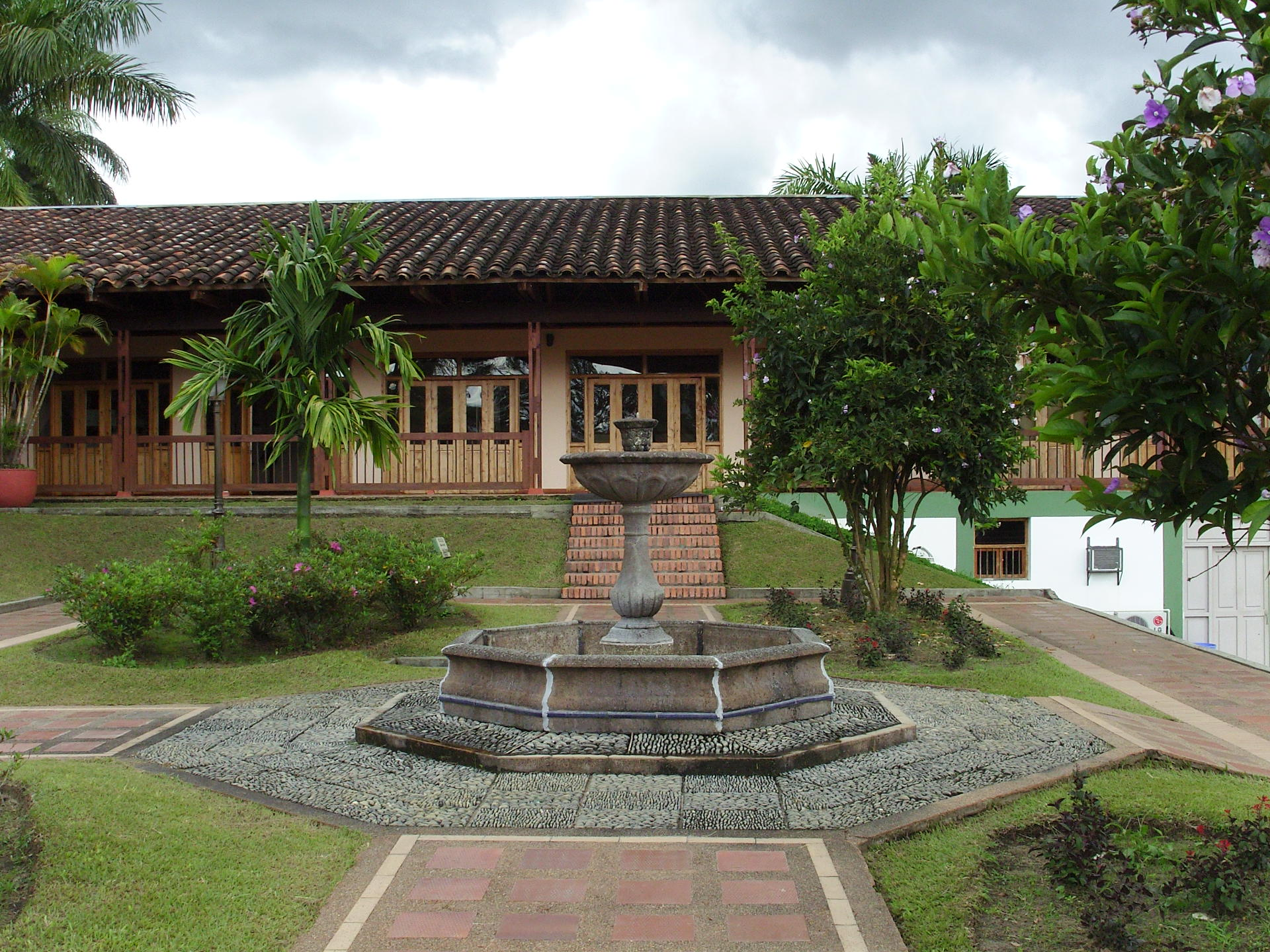
Coffee Museum

Folkloric House

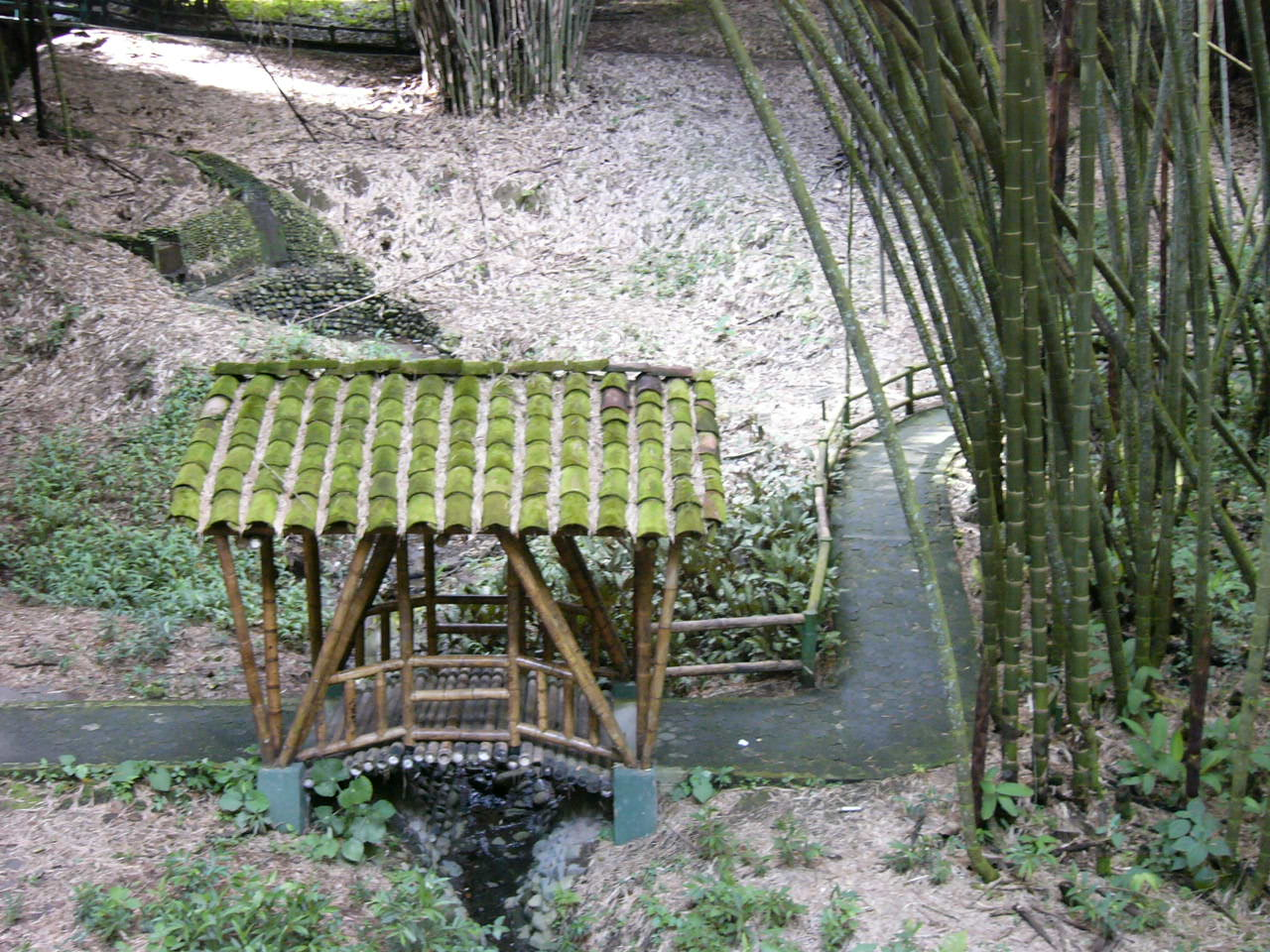
Bamboo Forest

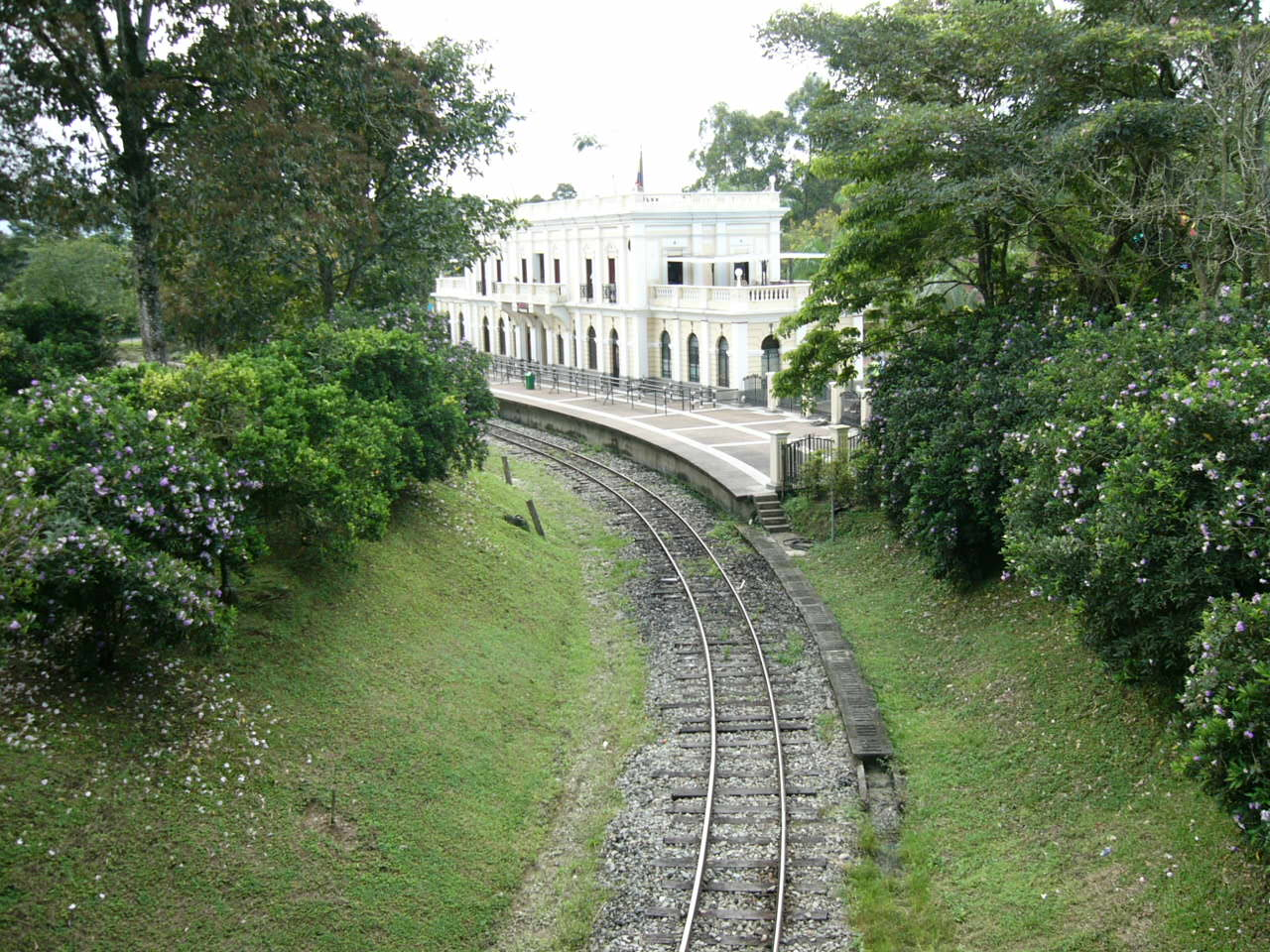
Railway Station

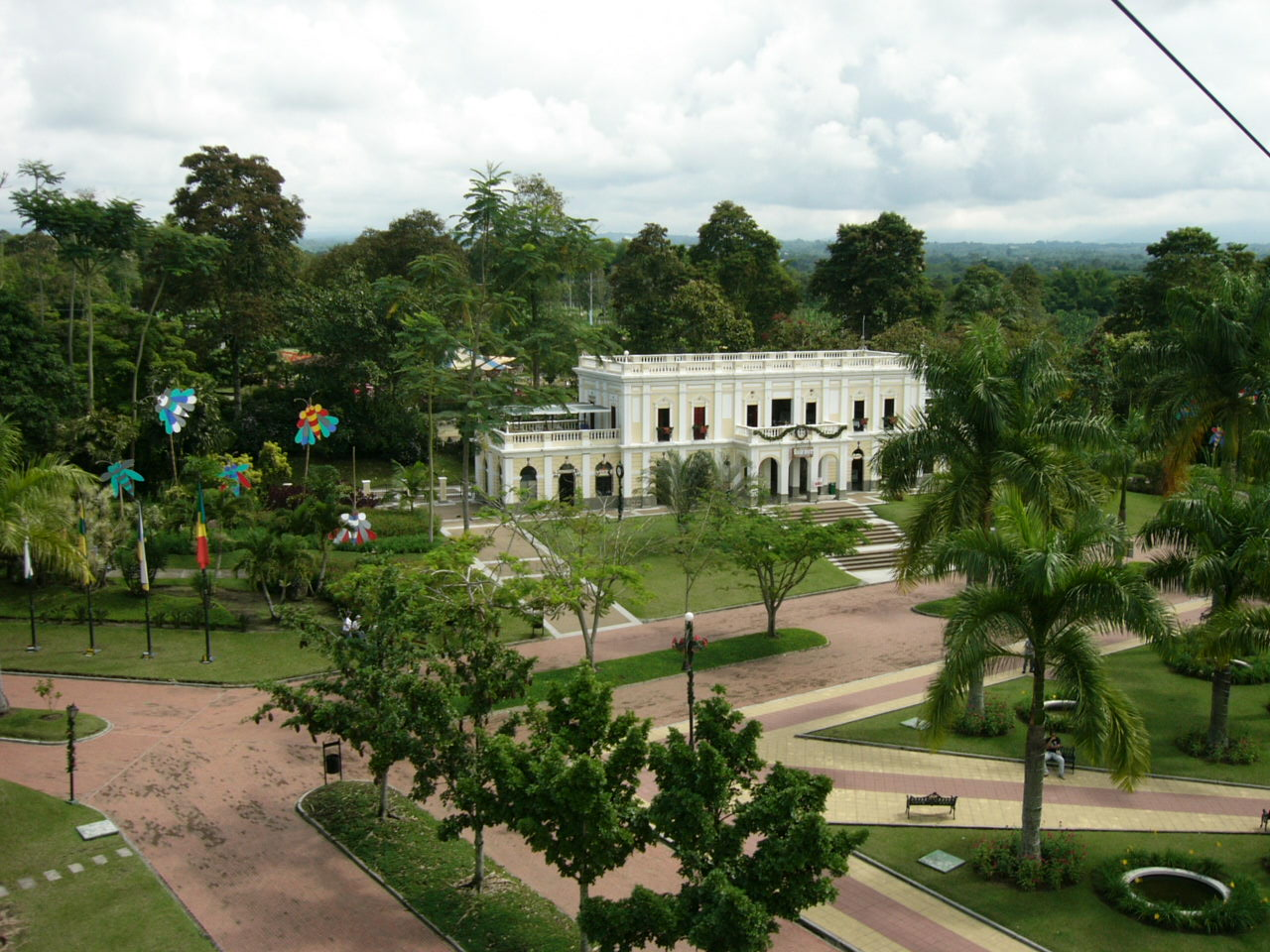
Railway Station

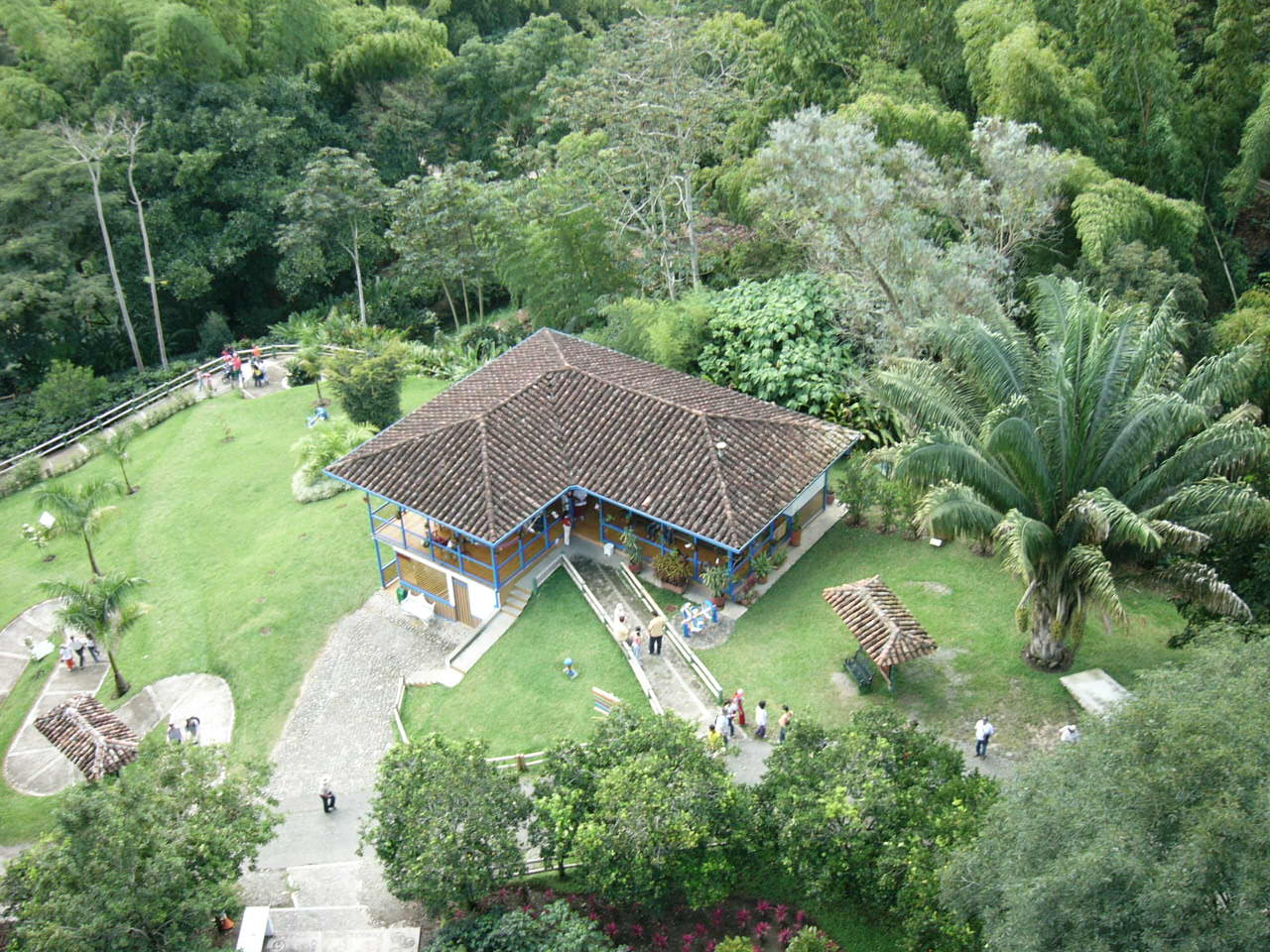
Aerial View

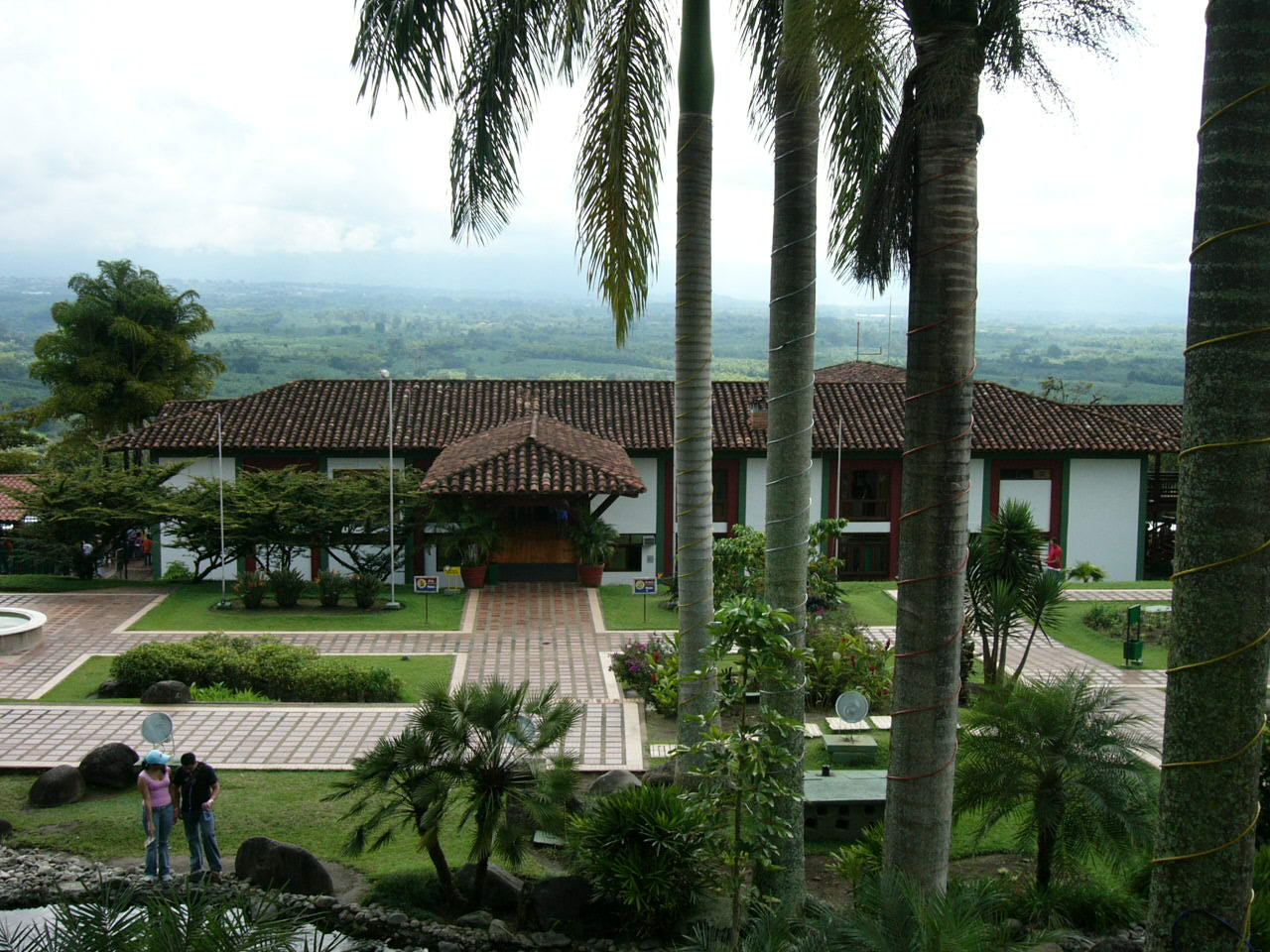
View

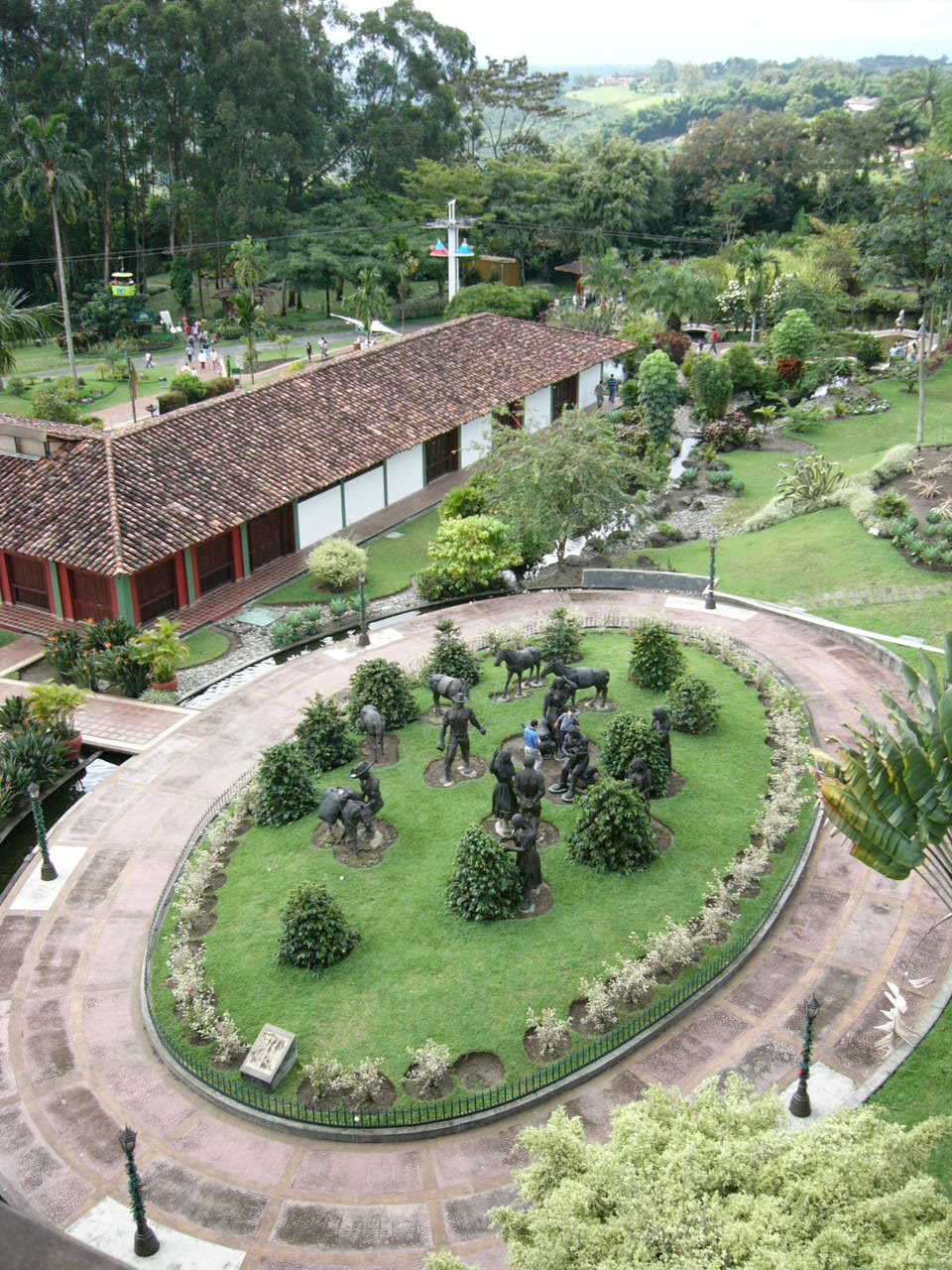
Statues

== See also ==
- Juan Valdez (International gourmet coffee brand)
- Manizales, Caldas (Colombian City)
- Pereira, Risaralda (Colombian City)
- Armenia, Quindío (Colombian City)
- 1999 Armenia earthquake
- Ibagué, Tolima (Colombian City)
- Caldas (Colombian department)
- Risaralda (Colombian department)
- Quindío (Colombian department)
- Tolima (Colombian department)
- Valle del Cauca (Colombian department)
- Antioquia (Colombian department)
- Coffee production in Colombia
