= Olga de Chica =

Colombian artist (1921–2016)

Olga Alba de Chica
- Born: August 21, 1921; Filandia
- Died: December 16, 2016 (aged 95); Manizales

Olga Alba de Chica (August 21, 1921 – December 16, 2016) was a Colombian self-taught neo-primitivist painter. She achieved recognition both domestically and abroad for her work.

== Biography ==
Olga de Chica was born in Filandia, in the coffee region of Quindío, Colombia in August 1921. She attended the Sacred Heart of Jesus High School in Filandia and the School of Fine Arts in Manizales. De Chica started painting as a child, when it is said she used squeezed flowers in an attempt to create lively colors. However, the bulk of her lifetime was spent as the wife of a local school teacher, and the mother of two daughters and a son. It was not until she was approaching her fifties that she became a professional painter.

De Chica painted in a style that is described as "primitivist", which she developed organically without any formal artistic training. Her works are mainly populated landscapes that communicate the look and feel of the typical, though sometimes nostalgic, life in rural Colombia. Her works are noted for their vibrant colors and charming representations of Colombian wildlife. Rural life, small towns and the coffee region of Quindío were the focus of her later work.

She died in Manizales in December 2016 at the age of 95.
