= Quimbaya, Quindío =

Coordinates: 4°38′N 75°45′W

- Municipality and town
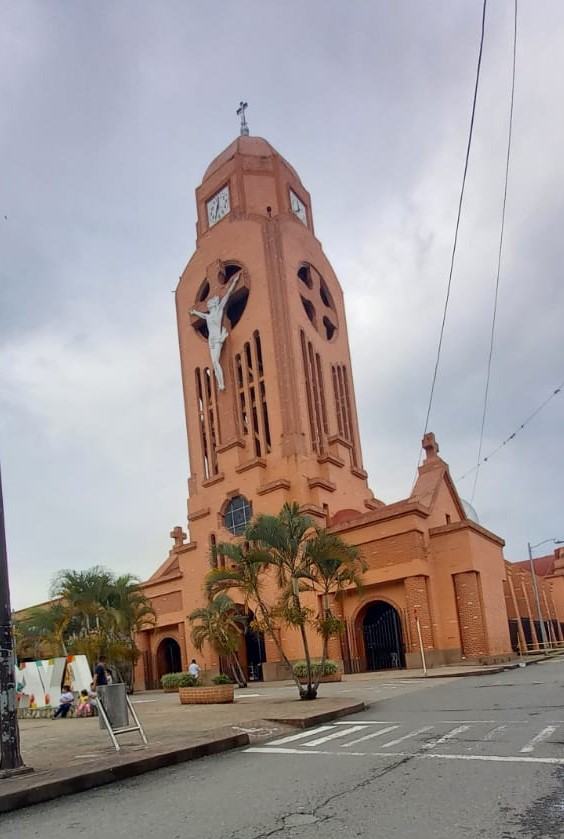
- Jesus, Mary and Joseph Church in the main park

- Flag Coat of arms

- Location of the municipality and town of Quimbaya, Quindío in the Quindío Department of Colombia.
- Country: Colombia
- Department: Quindío Department
- Elevation: 1,339 m (4,393 ft)

Population (2023)
  - Total: 31,844
- Time zone: UTC-5 (Colombia Standard Time)

Quimbaya is a town and municipality in the western part of the department of Quindío, Colombia. It is 20 km (12 mi) northwest of the departmental capital Armenia. The name of the city derives from the name of the Precolumbian culture that inhabited the area, the Quimbaya civilization. Located along the Colombian coffee growing axis, the municipality was made part of the "Coffee Cultural Landscape" UNESCO World Heritage Site in 2011.

== History ==
Quimbaya was founded in 1914 by Juan de J. Buitrago, and became a municipality in 1922. In 2023 the town had an estimated population of 31,844.

== Geography ==
Quimbaya is bounded to the north and west by the Valle del Cauca Department, with La Vieja River forming the western limit. To the south, the Roble River forms the limit with the municipalities of Montenegro and Circasia. The eastern boundary is with the municipality of Filandia.

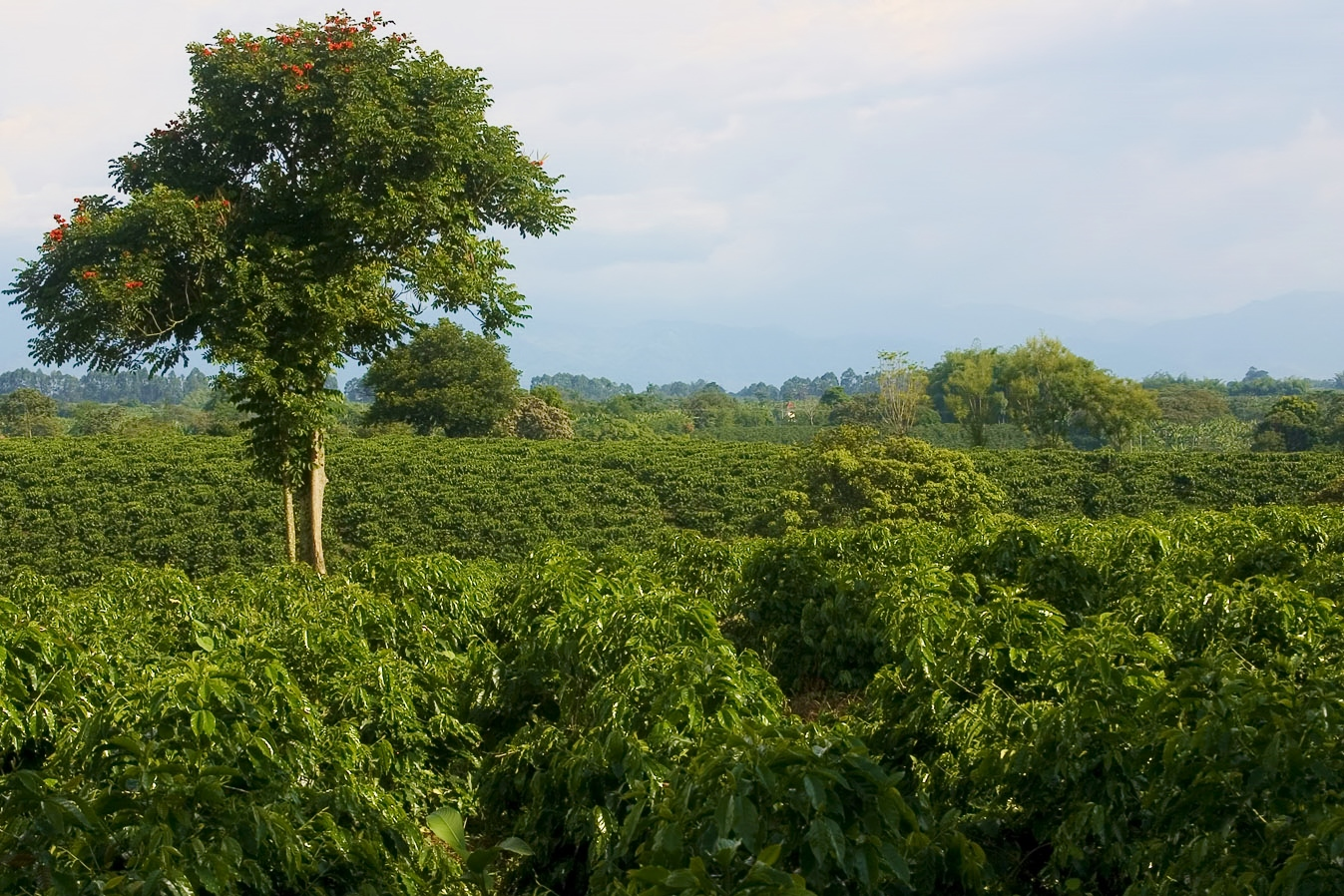
Coffee plantations in the south of Quimbaya.

=== Climate ===
Quimbaya has a subtropical highland climate with an average annual temperature of 21°C.

== Tourism ==
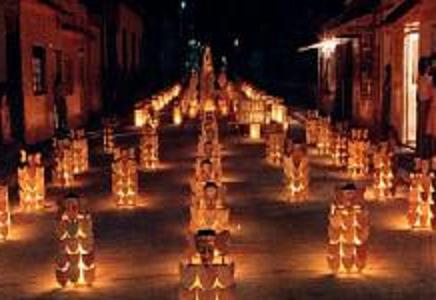
Paper lanterns in Quimbaya, Quindío candlelight festival

The National Agricultural and livestock Park (Spanish: El Parque Natural De La Cultura Agropecuaria), PANACA, is located 7 km west of the main township. The 47-hectare park contains a variety of interactive exhibits, including more than 200 species of animals. Along with the National Coffee Park in Montenegro, the theme park is one of major tourist attractions of the department.

The most important cultural event is the Candles and Lanterns Festival (full name in Spanish: Fiesta Nacional del Concurso de Alumbrados con Velas y Faroles), which began in 1982 and is held each year on 7 and 8 December (Día de las Velitas). Each of the barrios in the township compete to produce the most spectacular lighting arrangements, and many visitors come from throughout Colombia to admire the displays. The festival is held in honor of the Catholic holy day, the Feast of the Immaculate Conception, on 8 December.
