= Filandia, Quindío =

Filandia
- Municipality and town
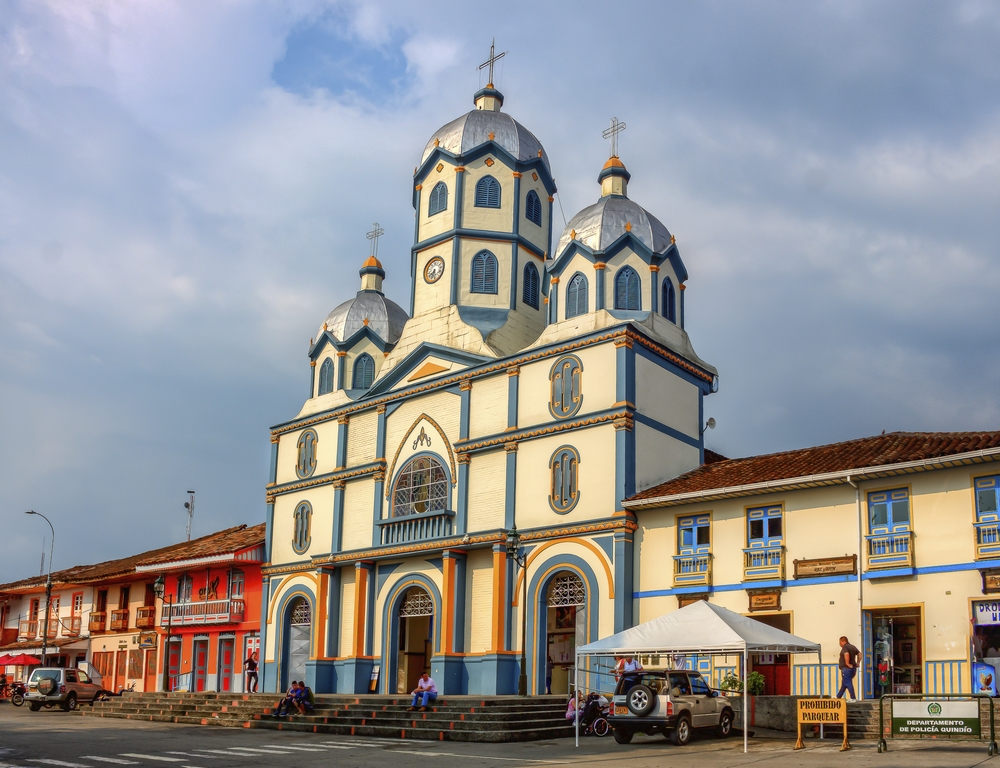
- Filandia, Quindio

- Flag Coat of arms
- Nickname: "La Colina Iluminada de los Andes" ("Illuminated Hill of the Andes")
- Location of the municipality and town of Filandia, Quindío in the Quindío Department of Colombia.
- Coordinates: 4°41′N 75°40′W
- Country: Colombia
- Department: Quindío
- Founded: 20 August 1878

Area
  - Municipality and town: 109.4 km^{2} (42.2 sq mi)
  - Urban: 0.8 km^{2} (0.31 sq mi)
  - Rural: 108.6 km^{2} (41.9 sq mi)
- Elevation: 1,910 m (6,270 ft)

Population (2023)
  - Municipality and town: 12,596
- Time zone: UTC-5 (Colombia Standard Time (GMT-5))
- Website: http://filandia-quindio.gov.co/index.shtml

Filandia is a town and municipality in the northern part of the department of Quindío, Colombia. It's located on the west side of Cordillera Central of the Andes mountain range running through central Colombia, 26 km north of the departmental capital Armenia. In 2023 the estimated population of Filandia was 12,596 inhabitants.

== History ==
The town, currently known as "La Colina Iluminada de los Andes" ("The Illuminated Hill of the Andes"), is the second oldest municipality in the department. In Pre-Columbian times the territory where modern Filandia is located was occupied by indigenous peoples of the Quimbaya tribe, who not only practiced agriculture but were also noted for their metalwork, particularly in gold and tumbaga, an alloy of gold and copper. The name Filandia comes from "Filia" (daughter), "Andia" (Andes); Filandia, daughter of the Andes. The Quimbayans began to diminish in number after the arrival of the Spanish in the 16th century. It is estimated that Filandia along with most of the Quindío territories were uninhabited for about 200 years until the "Colonizacion Antioqueña" in the 19th century.

It is thought that by 1870 settlers from the department of Antioquia in the northwest of Colombia were already settled in modern-day Filandia. On August 20, 1878, Filandia was founded by Felipe Melendez, Eliseo Buitrago, and others, as a settlement of Colombians escaping the misfortune faced by the rest of the nation at the time. The Antioqueños came to Quindío attracted by the rumors of massive gold and emerald deposits in the area.

In the early years of the 20th century, Filandia was a prosperous community - trade and industry had grown to the point that by 1900 there were estimated to be 250,000 coffee bushes in Filandia. As a response to the increased coffee production, many processing plants were created and the coffee culture now synonymous with the town was born.

By 1930, however, Filandia was in decline. The road the first settlers used to populate the town lost its importance due to the construction of a highway to the east connecting the capital of Risaralda and the capital of Quindío, isolating the town and providing a more direct alternate route to goods and services that previously were obliged to pass through Filandia.

== Geography ==
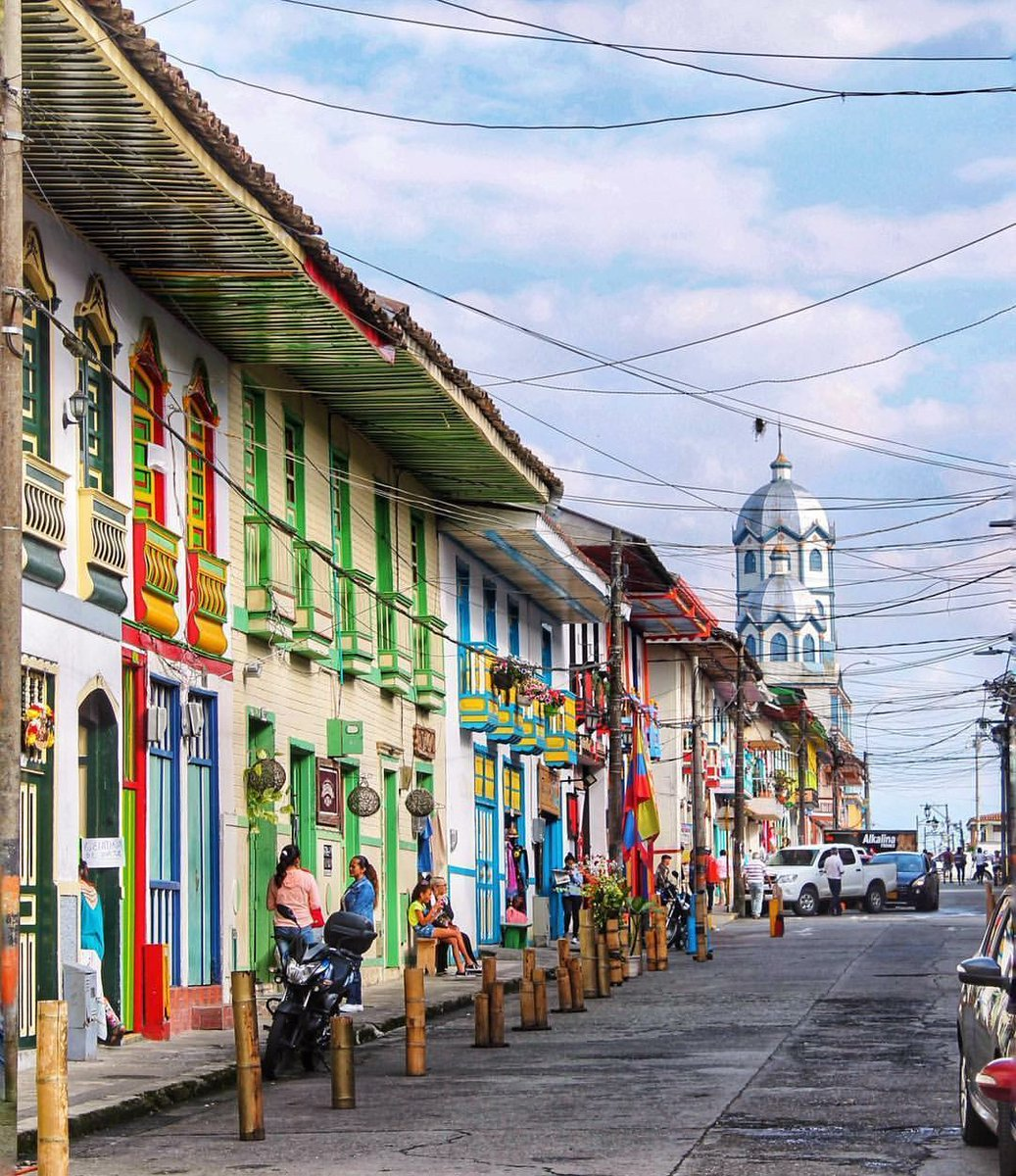

Filandia is the northernmost town of the Department of Quindío. The town is located on the west slope of the Cordillera Central of the Colombian Andes, on the Alto Cauca basin and the Rio La Vieja sub-basin. The main urban area is located at an altitude of 1923 metres above sea level and the altitude range of the municipality is between 1300 and 2200 metres above sea level.

The total territory of the municipality extends from the foot of the Andes to the plains of the northern Valle del Cauca department. The town is bordered by the department of Risaralda to the north, the department of Valle del Cauca to the west, the town of Salento to the east, the town of Circasia to the south, and the town of Quimbaya to the southwest.

Although coffee is the major agricultural product, the municipality's diverse ecosystem makes it perfect for the production of numerous fruits and vegetables.

=== Climate ===
Due to its geographical location, Filandia has a subtropical highland climate characterized by two main climatic indicators, "frió-húmedo" (cold-humid) and "templado-húmedo" (warm-humid). The average annual temperature is 18 °C, and precipitation in the form of rain is sporadic. However, due to the climatic phenomena known as El Niño and La Niña precipitation in the form of hail sometimes occurs, most recently in 1996 when approximately 15 cm of hail fell over most of northern Quindío.

== Economy ==
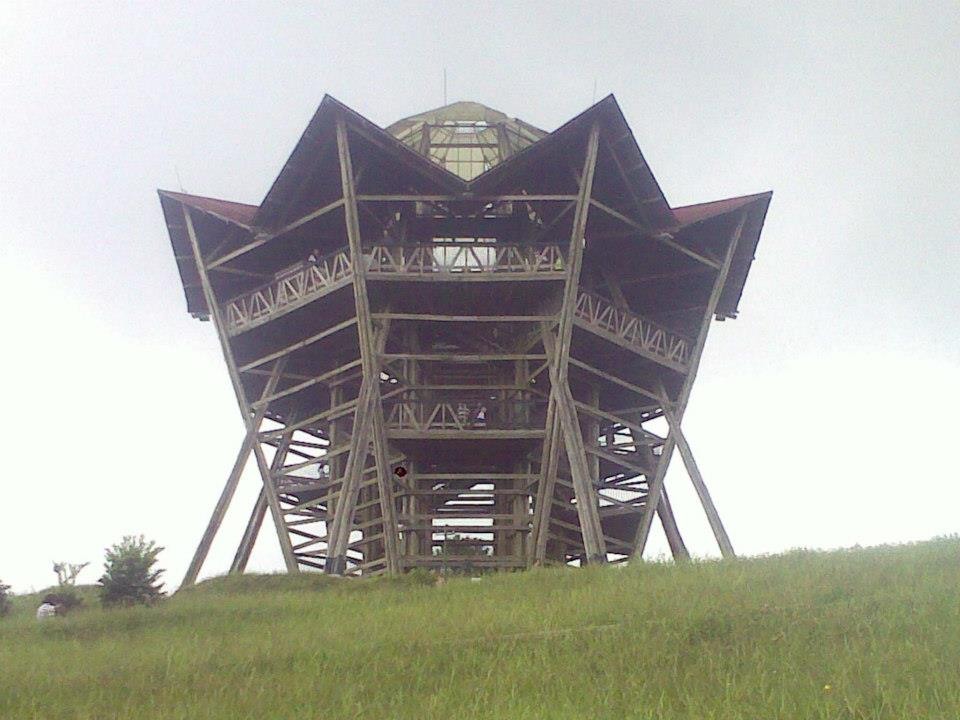
The mirador

Located within the Colombian coffee growing axis, the historic center of the town was made part of the "Coffee Cultural Landscape" UNESCO World Heritage Site in 2011.

The economy of Filandia is heavily dependent on agriculture (the main crop being coffee) and tourism. Another source of income is money sent from other countries by family members that have emigrated to the United States and Europe. The largest of these immigrant communities originating from Filandia is located in Madison, New Jersey where several Filandeños have settled.

The town's best-known tourist attractions are its "mirador" (viewing tower) with its extensive views over the Cauca River valley to the west and the Parque Nacional Natural los Nevados to the east (it's also possible to see both Armenia and Pereira from the top of the tower), and the cafe in the main square where scenes from the popular Colombian telenovela Cafe, con aroma de mujer were filmed.
