= PANACA =

Farming-themed amusement park in Colombia

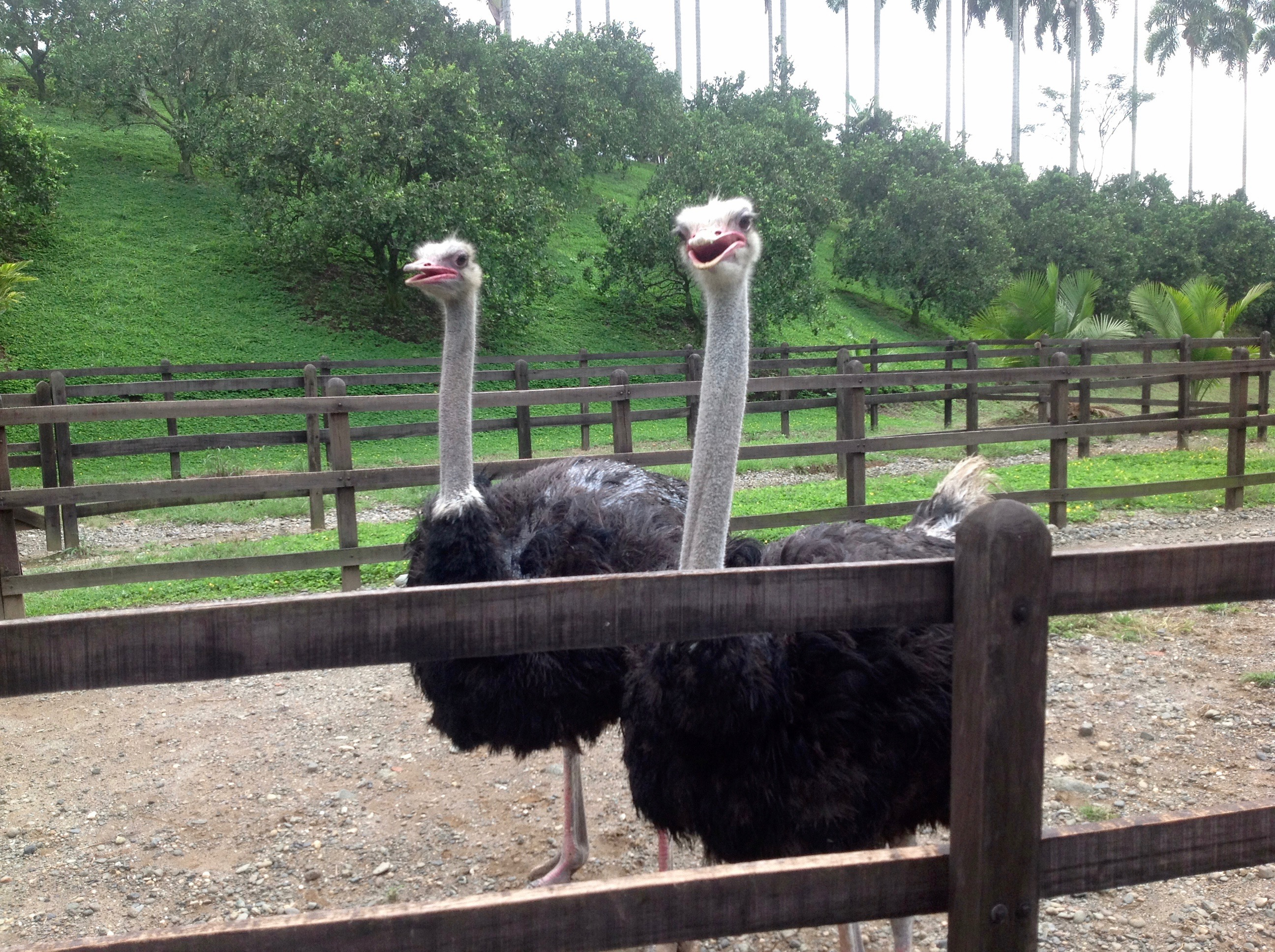
Pair of ostriches at PANACA

PANACA (Spanish: Parque Nacional De La Cultura Agropecuaria) is a farming-themed amusement park in Quimbaya, Colombia. The park was built by a group of businessmen in 1990 in the Quindío Department of west-central Colombia, a region famed for its production of coffee, and was intended to promote contact between humans and nature and create awareness about agriculture, specifically for those who live in the city. Today, it is one of the biggest agricultural parks in the country.

To better accommodate tourism the theme park now offers lodging. Neighboring the park are two of the park's lodging complexes, called "Fincas Panaca" and "Pueblo Panaca". Fincas Panaca was founded in 2011 and consists of 62 individual villas. Pueblo Panaca, started in 2017, is nearing its final phase of construction and will mimic life in a small town.
