= Circasia, Quindío =

Coordinates: 4°37′N 75°38′W

- Municipality and town
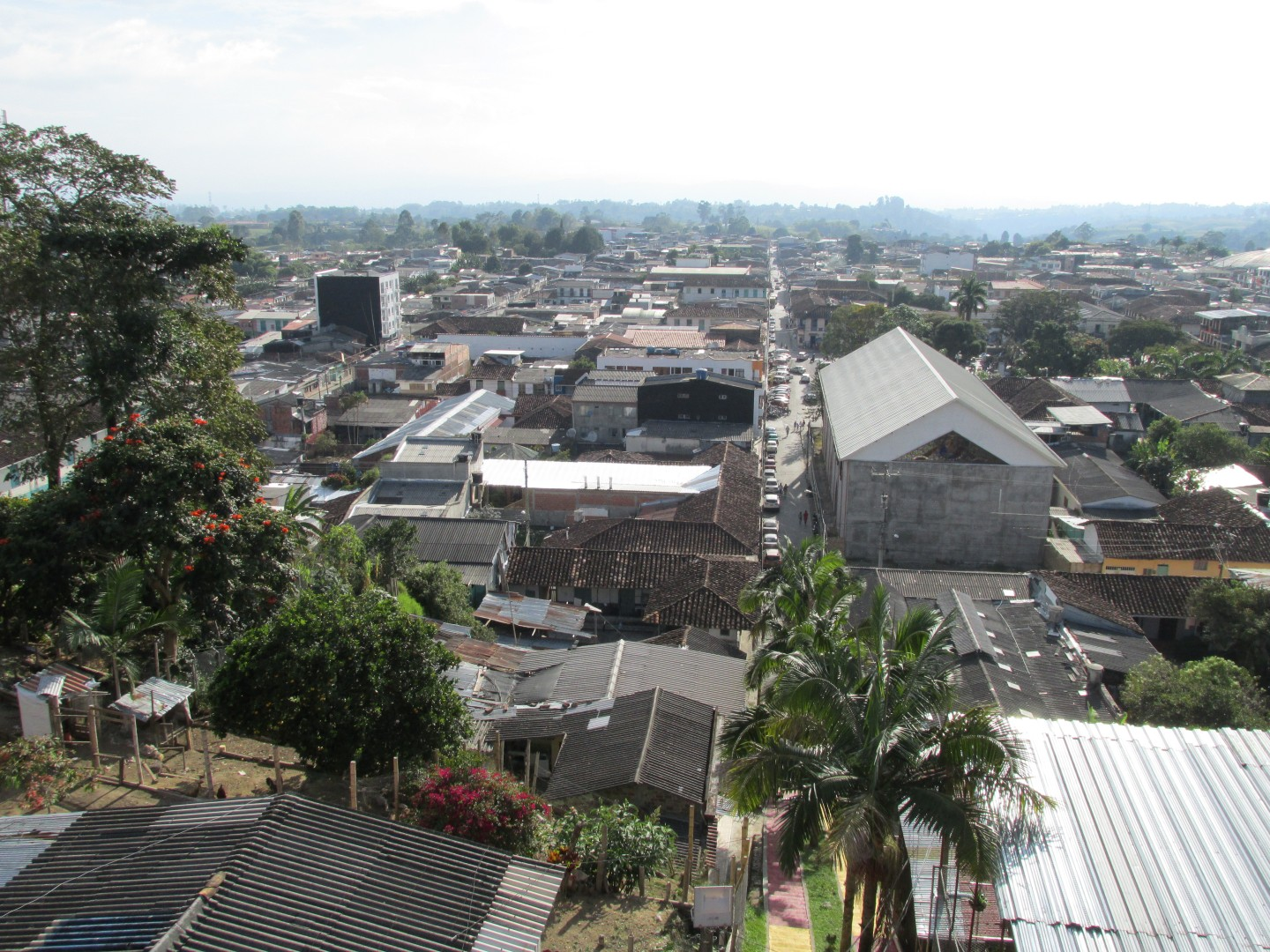
- View of Circasia

- Flag Coat of arms

- Location of the municipality and town of Circasia, Quindío in the Quindío Department of Colombia.
- Country: Colombia
- Department: Quindío Department

Area
  - Total: 91 km^{2} (35 sq mi)
- Elevation: 1,771 m (5,810 ft)

Population (2023)
  - Total: 29,500
- Time zone: UTC-5 (Colombia Standard Time)

Circasia (Spanish pronunciation: [siɾˈkasja]) is a municipality in the northern part of the department of Quindío, Colombia. It is located 7 km north of the department's capital Armenia. Located within the Colombian coffee growing axis, the historic center of Circasia was made part of the "Coffee Cultural Landscape" UNESCO World Heritage Site in 2011.

== History ==
Circasia was founded in 1884 by Javier Arias. It became a separate municipality in 1906 when was separated from Filandia. In 2023 the town had an estimated population of 29,500.

The name of the municipality of Circasia is based on the region of the same name (Circassia), located in the North Caucasus (Eastern Europe) and near the northeastern shore of the Black Sea. The global impact of events in the European and Asian empires during the 19th century transcended borders, reaching the Americas and, consequently, Colombia. Therefore, it was common for people from Antioquia to use the names of these regions to designate newly colonized and founded territories.

Circasia is known for its Free Cemetery (Spanish: Cementerio Libre), located on the outskirts of the township on the road to Montenegro. It was founded in 1933 by Braulio Botero as a place in which any person could be buried, regardless of their religious beliefs. The cemetery is now a symbol for liberty and equality.

== Geography ==
The township is situated a short distance from the highway between Armenia and Pereira, Risaralda. There is a paved road southwest to Montenegro, which passes through most of the rural area of the municipality. There is also a rural road north to Filandia, which descends to cross the Roble River at a point known as the Aguadeños Pass (Spanish: Paso de los Aguadeños). However, all public transport to Filandia uses the main highway.

=== Climate ===
Circasia has a subtropical highland climate with an average annual temperature of 18 °C.

== Tourism ==
There are many nicely decorated coffee shops by the main square as many towns of Quindío. Circasia also offers destinations for fine dining.

Circasia is quietly becoming a major destination for retirees in search of a quiet chateau style place to spend their spare time. Its colder climate sounds very attractive to regional developers.

== Born in Circasia ==
- Natalia López Cardona, Model and beauty queen
