= Matecaña City Zoo =

Zoo located in Pereira, Colombia

Matecaña City Zoo Zoológico Matecaña
- Date opened: 1959
- Date closed: 2015
- Location: Pereira, Colombia
- Land area: 17 hectares (42 acres)
- No. of animals: 800
- No. of species: 150
- Memberships: Society of Public Improvements Pereira
- Website: http://www.zoopereira.org/

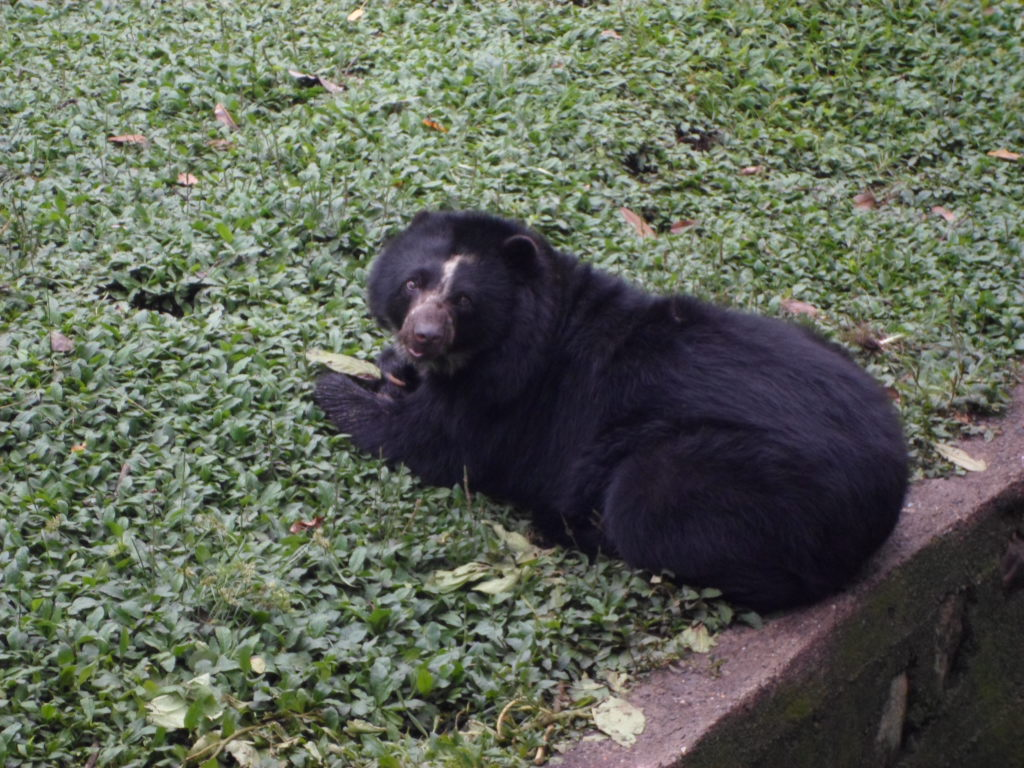
At the Matecaña City Zoo.

The Matecaña City Zoo (Zoológico Matecaña) was a zoo located in Pereira, Colombia.

The zoo had a collection of 800 individuals from 150 different species, including birds, mammals, and snakes from the Americas, Africa and Asia, as well as endemic species. The design allowed the surroundings of each species to closely mimic their natural habitat. The botanic gardens also had diverse native and non-native flora.

== History ==
It was established in 1951 by the Pereira Society of Public Improvements on 17 hectares (42 acres) of land from the Matecaña farm. The original purpose had been to build a football stadium, but the ground was not considered suitable.

In 1959 the first secure cages were built to lock the few captive animals, the project was made official and the purchase of animals was authorized. In 1961 was the chronological accuracy of its foundation and opened an item in the budget for food, maintenance and management of animals like condors (Andean Condor), Bengal tigers (Panthera tigris tigris), eagles and the Colombian Atlantic coast flamingos. In 1968 the park was visited by dignitaries from Mexico and made contact with the Chapultepec Zoo. The animals purchased were an Asian elephant, a zebra (male), two hippos, sacred baboons (Papio hamadryas) and sable antelopes. expanding the collection.

The collection was maintained until 1993 when exotic African fauna arrived from Hacienda Napoles (Pablo Escobar's country house). In 1999 the education department was established to coordinate environmental education programs for the conservation of biodiversity in Colombia and spread the importance of all species of wild fauna and flora.

The zoo closed in 2015 and most of the animals were moved to the newer Ukumari Park on the outskirts of Pereira.

== Matecaña zoo sites ==
- Serpent
- Clinic
- Step Home
- Bird place (aviary)
- Museum of Natural Sciences
- Lake
- Education Department (Zoo Guides)
