= Quindío River =

River in Colombia

Coordinates: 4.393803°N 75.798246°W

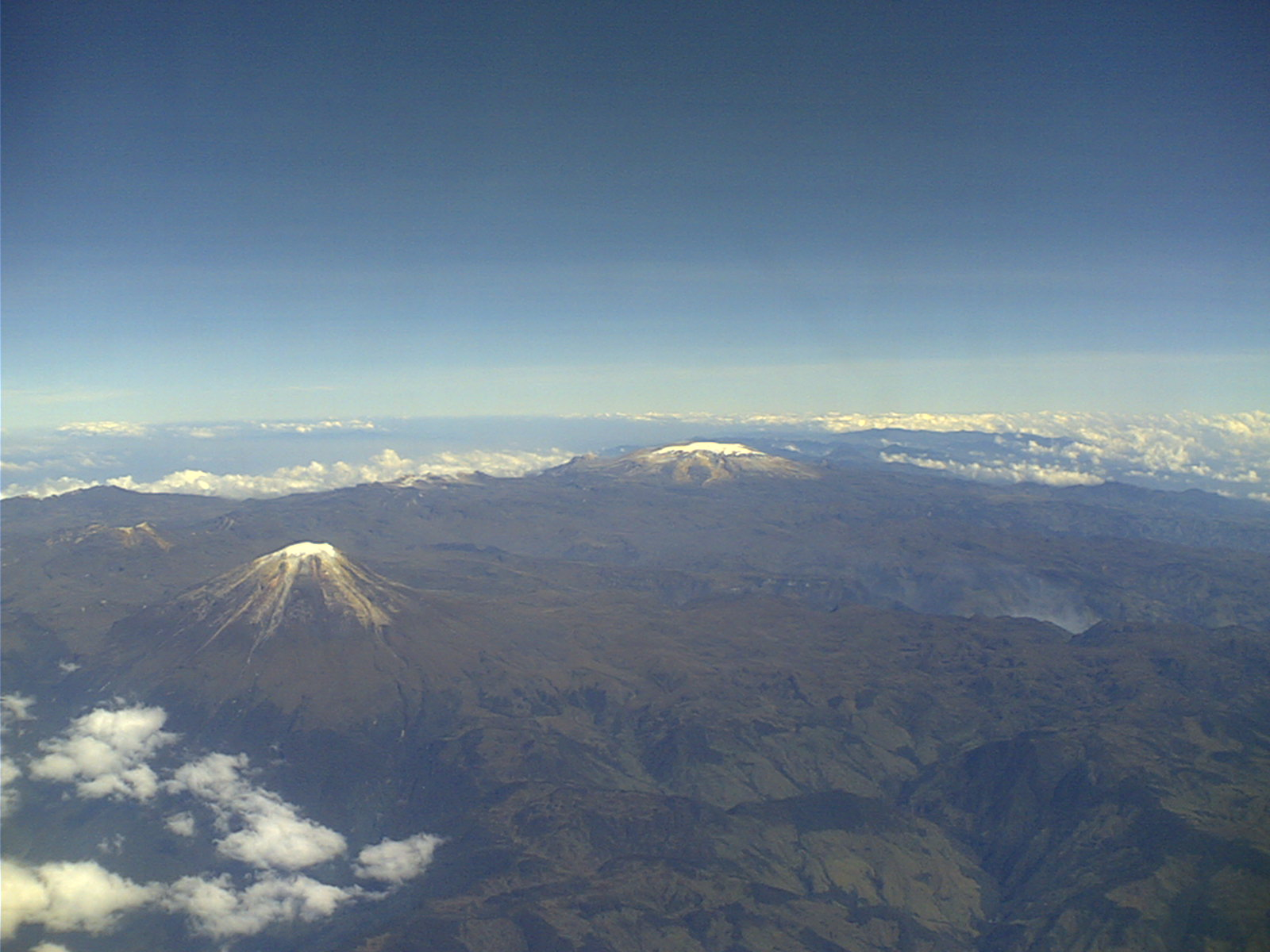
Quindio River begins in Los Nevados National Park.

Quindío River (Spanish: Río Quindío) is the principal river of the department of Quindío, Colombia. It combines with the Barragán River at the Valle de Maravelez to form La Vieja River, in turn a tributary of the Cauca River.

Quindío River Is 69 kilometres (43 mi) long. It forms in the mountains east of Salento and flows in a south-westerly direction, passing by the township of Salento and forming the eastern limit of the city of Armenia. Its major tributaries are the Verde River and the Navarco River (these in turn have the tributaries Santo Domingo and Boquerón, respectively). The total watershed including these tributaries is 691 square kilometres (267 mi^{2}). The average flow at the mouth is 29 cubic metres per second (1,000 cu ft/s).

The river is the source of drinking water for the majority of the inhabitants of the department. The continued increase in demand is placing significant pressure on this resource. Additionally, there are contamination problems due to inadequate waste water treatment facilities in the municipalities along the river.
