= La Vieja River =

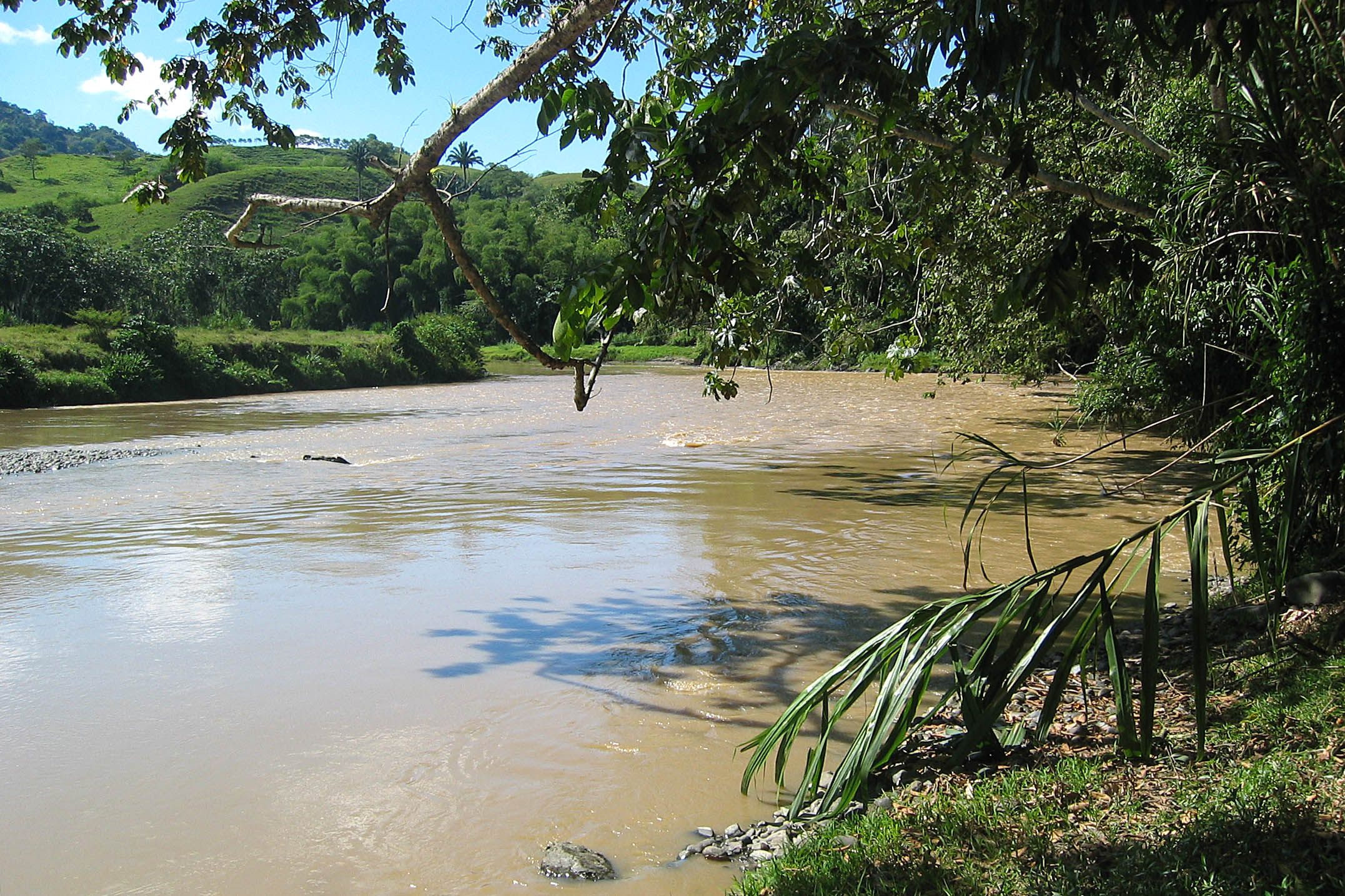
- La Vieja River, at the mouth of the Roble River

Location
- Country: Colombian departments of Quindío, Valle del Cauca and Risaralda

Physical characteristics
- Source
  - location: Valle de Maravelez, Quindío, Colombia
  - coordinates: 4°23′40″N 75°48′10″W
- Mouth
  - location: Cauca River
  - coordinates: 4°48′25″N 75°56′08″W
- Length: 102 km (63 mi)
- Basin size: 2,925 km^{2} (1,129 sq mi)
- Discharge
  - average: 92 m^{3}/s (3,200 cu ft/s)

La Vieja River (Spanish: Río La Vieja) is a river in the Colombian departments of Quindío, Valle del Cauca and Risaralda. It is a major tributary of the Cauca River.

The river is formed by the joining of the Quindío River and the Barragán River in an area known as the Valle de Maravelez. It has a length of 102 kilometres (63 mi) and flows in a northwesterly direction, meeting the Cauca River approximately 7 kilometres (4 mi) north of Cartago. Major tributaries include the Roble, Consota, Barbas, Espejo and Pijao rivers. La Vieja forms the limit between the departments of Quindío and Valle del Cauca; it also forms part of the limit between Risaralda and Valle del Cauca.

The river basin has an area of 2,925 square kilometres (1,129 mi^{2}) and includes the entire department of Quindío. Although Cartago is the only major urban area situated directly on the river, the cities of Armenia and Pereira are located in its watershed. The average river flow is 92 cubic metres per second (3,200 cu ft/s).

Recreational use of the river includes the increasingly popular tourist activity balsaje, in which groups of up to 16 people explore the slow-flowing river in large rafts made of guadua. The majority of these excursions depart from Puerto Samaria in the municipality of Montenegro, Quindío, and arrive at Puerto Alejandrino in neighboring Quimbaya. The number of participants has grown from 400 in 2000 to over 11,000 in 2003, and at least a dozen firms are offering this service.

La Vieja has significant contamination problems, primarily due to inadequate wastewater treatment in its watershed.
