= Media ownership in Colombia =

Media ownership in Colombia is highly concentrated. The four largest newspapers together account for two-thirds of total readership, and the two largest television channels have about two-thirds of the market and 78% of advertising revenues, according to a 2016 study by Reporters Without Borders and the Colombian Federation of Journalists.

In total, three companies control 57 percent of the market in print, television and radio. The owners of the three companies, Luis Carlos Sarmiento Angulo, Carlos Ardilla Lülle and Alejandro Santo Domingo, are among the 200 richest people in the world, according to Forbes.

Most popular media outlets in the country, in which the audience is concentrated, are privately owned. There are three state-owned television stations, but two private networks, Caracol and RCN, dominate viewership. Print media is all privately owned.

== Luis Carlos Sarmiento Angulo ==
Luis Carlos Sarmiento is the country's richest man, according to Forbes Magazine and controls a cluster of corporations in a broad spectrum of business such as financial, agricultural industry, mining industry, energy and gas, infrastructure, construction, and media. He started his business in construction and, as the industry and his revenues grew bigger, he diversified to banking, media and other industries.

Sarmiento owns Casa Editorial El Tiempo, which controls more than 25 print and broadcast media outlets. such as El Tiempo, one of the largest national newspapers, the ADN newspapers in regional cities, and CityTv.

Some other news outlets, like La Silla Vacía, have been critical of Sarmiento's role in the news industry.– particularly its coverage of political and economic issues. In 2011, La Silla Vacía outlined a number of conflicts of interest for the media group in covering Sarmiento's wide-ranging business holdings.

In the words of Revista Semana’s columnist María Jimena Duzán, “there is practically no sector (banking, mining industry, construction, etc.) in which Grupo Sarmiento doesn’t have an economic interest”.

La Silla Vacía gave some examples of El Tiempo's potential conflicts, especially regarding Grupo Aval, Sarmiento's bank holding company. On several occasions, El Tiempo has dedicated excessive coverage to news about the company, making the distinction between journalism and advertisement seem invisible, according to La Silla Vacia.

== Carlos Ardila Lülle ==
Carlos Ardila Lülle is also on the list of Colombia's wealthiest people. His holding company, Organización Ardila Lülle, controls about 50 companies in agricultural, industrial, communications, finance, insurance, real-estate and automobiles. One of the most important is the country's biggest sugar refinery, Incauca, and beverage company Postobon. In the media sector he's the owner of Colombian biggest broadcast station, Cadena RCN Radio and the TV channel with the greatest audience share, Canal RCN.

His relationships with political actors are well known. Ardila Lülle's son is part of the board of directors of Organización Ardila Lülle and was also the Colombian ambassador to Spain between 1998 and 2001. Some independent media, like La Silla Vacía, attributed this appointment as payback for RCN's support of Andrés Pastrana’s presidential campaign.

He also contributed economically to Alvaro Uribe’s presidential campaign in 2002 as well as to his reelection in 2006. La Silla Vacía claims that among the first things Uribe did after reelection as president was to thank Ardila Lülle for his support. After Uribe's term was over, the ex-president wanted to continue his legacy through his former Ministro del Interior, Juan Manuel Santos, who won the elections. For his second term, Santos lost Uribe's support, but continued to have Lülle's one. La Silla Vacía and other critical outlets have repeatedly said that RCN coverage of Santos's reelection was key to his victory, due to the huge impact the television channel has on the country

== Alejandro Santo Domingo ==
Alejandro Santo Domingo is, according to Forbes, Colombia's second-richest person. His father, Julio Mario Santo Domingo, constructed an empire that culminated in the creation of Santo Domingo Group and Valorem, two of the country's most important holding groups. Together they control a variety of businesses in real estate, retailing, tourism, transport and entertainment.

In the media industry, Santo Domingo Group owns Caracol Televisión, Comunican S.A and Inversiones Cromos S.A.S. It also owned until 2003 Caracol Cadena Radial, a radio broadcast network, until the Spanish company Prisa bought it. In order to regain its influence on the radio, Santo Domingo Group launched a new radio station, Blu radio, in 2012.

== Other major media companies ==
The four most read-newspapers nationwide, Q’Hubo, ADN, El Tiempo and Al Día belong to four different companies. Q’Hubo is the main tabloid newspaper in Colombia and has 12 local editions. It is owned jointly by Grupo Nacional de Medios, a company that owns three large regional newspaper companies, Galvis from Santander, Lloreda from Valle del Cauca and Gómez Hernández from Antioquia. Each of them are also owners of their own local newspapers.

=== Lloreda family ===
The Lloreda family owns several local newspapers and magazines on the Valle del Cauca region and also the most important newspaper in the capital, Cali, El País. The Lloredas have links to the right-wing Colombian Conservative Party as well as to the Asociación Colombiana de Petróleos, an oil company.

=== Gómez Hernández family ===
The Gómez Hernández family owns El Colombiano, a regional paper, and La República, one of the two business newspapers in Colombia. They have their own editorial group and a series of magazines. Their family has several links to the Conservative Party as well.

=== Galvis family ===
The Galvis family is based in Santander, where they own the most-read local newspapers such as La Vanguardia Liberal and El Universal. Their family has links to the Partido Conservador.

== See also ==
- Mass media in Colombia
- List of newspapers in Colombia
- Television in Colombia
- Corruption in Colombia
