= List of newspapers in Colombia =

The following is a list of newspapers in Colombia.

== List ==
Newspaper	Headquarters	website
El Colombiano	Medellín	www.elcolombiano.com
El Bogotano	Bogotá	www.elbogotano.com.co
La Crónica del Quindío	Armenia	www.cronicadelquindio.com
Diario de Occidente	Cali	www.diariooccidente.com.co
El Diario de Otún	Pereira	www.eldiario.com.co
Diario del Huila	Huila	www.diariodelhuila.com
Diario del Sur	Pasto	www.diariodelsur.com.co
Diario Deportivo	Bogotá	www.diariodeportivo.com
El Espectador	Bogotá	www.elespectador.com
El Espacio	Bogotá	www.elespacio.co
El Frente	Bucaramanga	www.elfrente.com.co
El Heraldo	Barranquilla	www.elheraldo.com.co
Hoy Diario del Magdalena	Santa Marta	www.hoydiariodelmagdalena.com.co
El Informador	Santa Marta	www.el-informador.com
La Libertad	Barranquilla	www.lalibertad.com.co
El Meridiano de Córdoba	Montería	www.elmeridianodecordoba.com.co
El Mundo	Medellín	www.elmundo.com
La Nación (Colombia)	Neiva	www.lanacion.com.co
El Nuevo Liberal	Popayán	www.elnuevoliberal.com
Magangué Hoy	Magangué	www.maganguehoy.com
El Meridiano de Sucre	Sincelejo	www.elmeridianodesucre.com.co
El Nuevo Día	Ibagué	www.elnuevodia.com.co
Nuevo Estadio	Manizales	www.nuevoestadio.com.co
El Nuevo Siglo	Bogotá	www.elnuevosiglo.com.co
El Opinión	Cúcuta	www.laopinion.com.co
El Pais	Cali	www.elpais.com.co
El País Vallenato	Valledupar	www.elpaisvallenato.com
La Patria	Manizales	www.lapatria.com
Portafolio	Bogotá	www.portafolio.com.co
El Porvenir	Cartagena	www.elporvenir.com.co
El Pílon	Valledupar	www.elpilon.com.co
La República	Bogotá	www.larepublica.com.co
La Tarde	Pereira	www.latarde.com
The Bogotá Post	Bogotá	www.thebogotapost.com
The City Paper Bogotá	Bogotá	www.thecitypaperbogota.com
El Tiempo	Bogotá	www.eltiempo.com
El Universal	Cartagena	www.eluniversal.com.co
Colombia Focus	Cocorná	www.colombiafocus.com
Colombia Reports	Medellín	www.colombiareports.com
Vanguardia	Bucaramanga	www.vanguardia.com
Vanguardia Valledupar	Valledupar	www.vanguardiavalledupar.com

== See also ==
- List of newspapers
