= La República (Colombia) =

Colombian newspaper

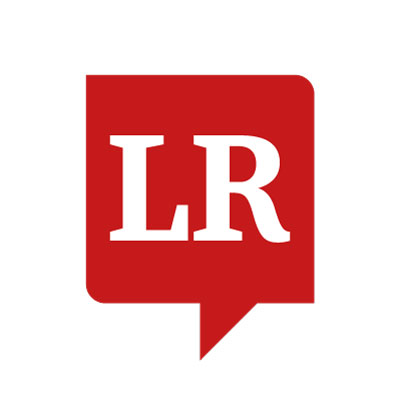

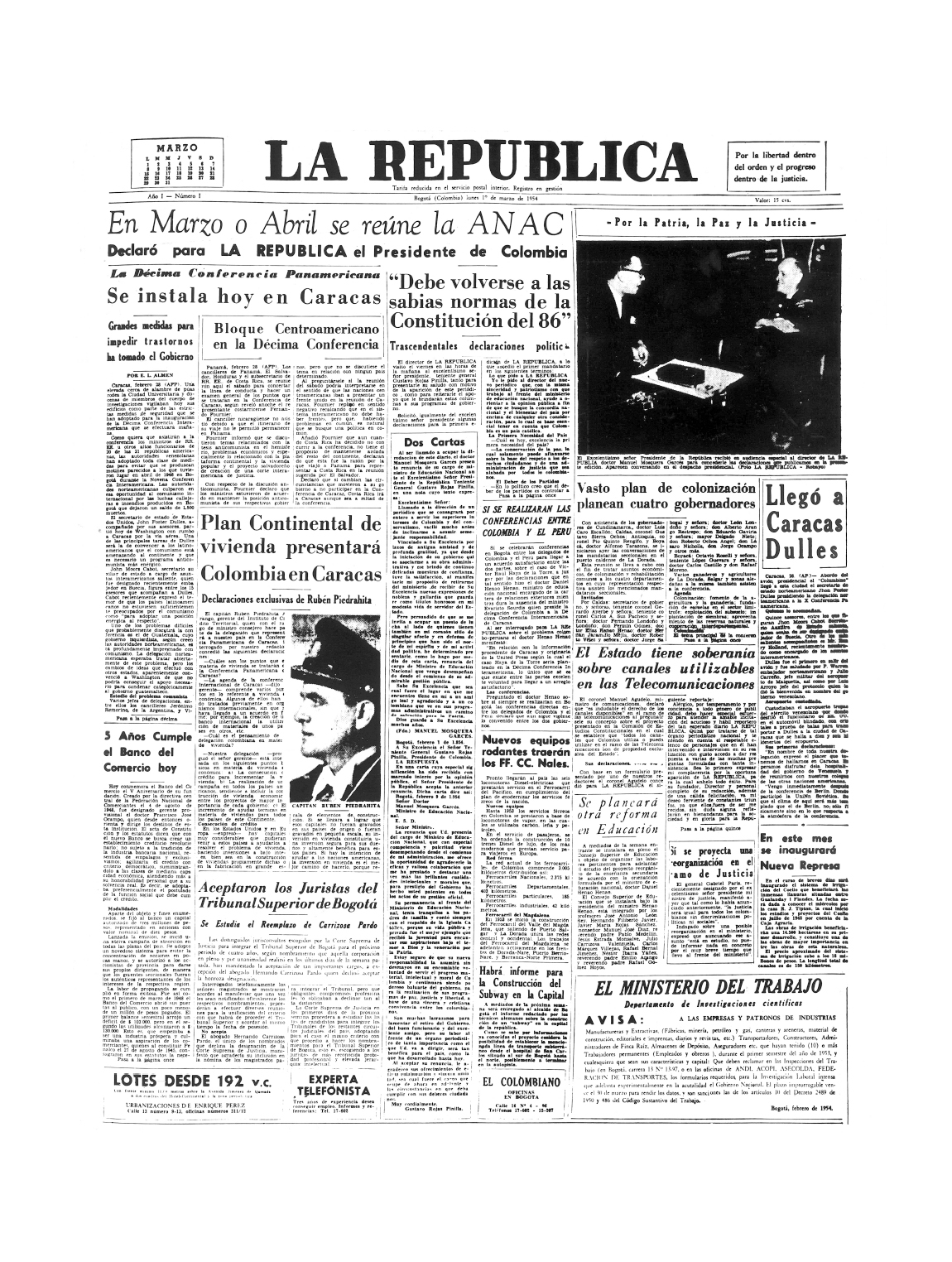
- La República front page of first edition, March 1, 1954 issue
- Type: Daily newspaper
- Format: Tabloid
- Founder(s): Mariano Ospina Pérez; Julio C. Hernández
- Editor: Fernando Quijano
- Founded: March 1, 1954; 72 years ago
- Political alignment: Centre-right, Liberalism, Economic liberalism
- Language: Spanish
- Headquarters: Calle 103 69B-43; Bogotá, D.C., Colombia
- Circulation: 50,000 (Mon–Sat); 190,000 (Sun)
- Price: $2,000(Mon–Sat) $3,700 (Sun)
- Website: larepublica.co

La República (LR) is an economic, business, financial and political newspaper of Colombia. Its main headquarters is in Bogotá, D.C., and its circulation reaches the main capitals and municipalities of the country. It has a printed audience of over 200,000 readers and an average national circulation of 70,000 copies of mixed circulation. The newspaper was founded in 1954 by president Mariano Ospina Pérez and the businessman Julio C. Hernández.

One of its owners was El Colombiano, but in August 2002 it was acquired by the Ardila Lülle Organization, a group that bought all the shares of the newspaper along with the printing press and other elements except for the newspaper's headquarters in Bogotá, D.C., for a value of $10 billion. This integrated the newspaper into the media conglomerate of the organization to which RCN Radio and RCN Televisión belong. In December 2002, the new shareholder took control of the newspaper through the new company called La República S.A.S Editorial, which, from that moment on, replaced the Globo S.A.A. Editorial Company.
