= Quimbaya Museum =

Coordinates: 4.57142°N 75.65022°W

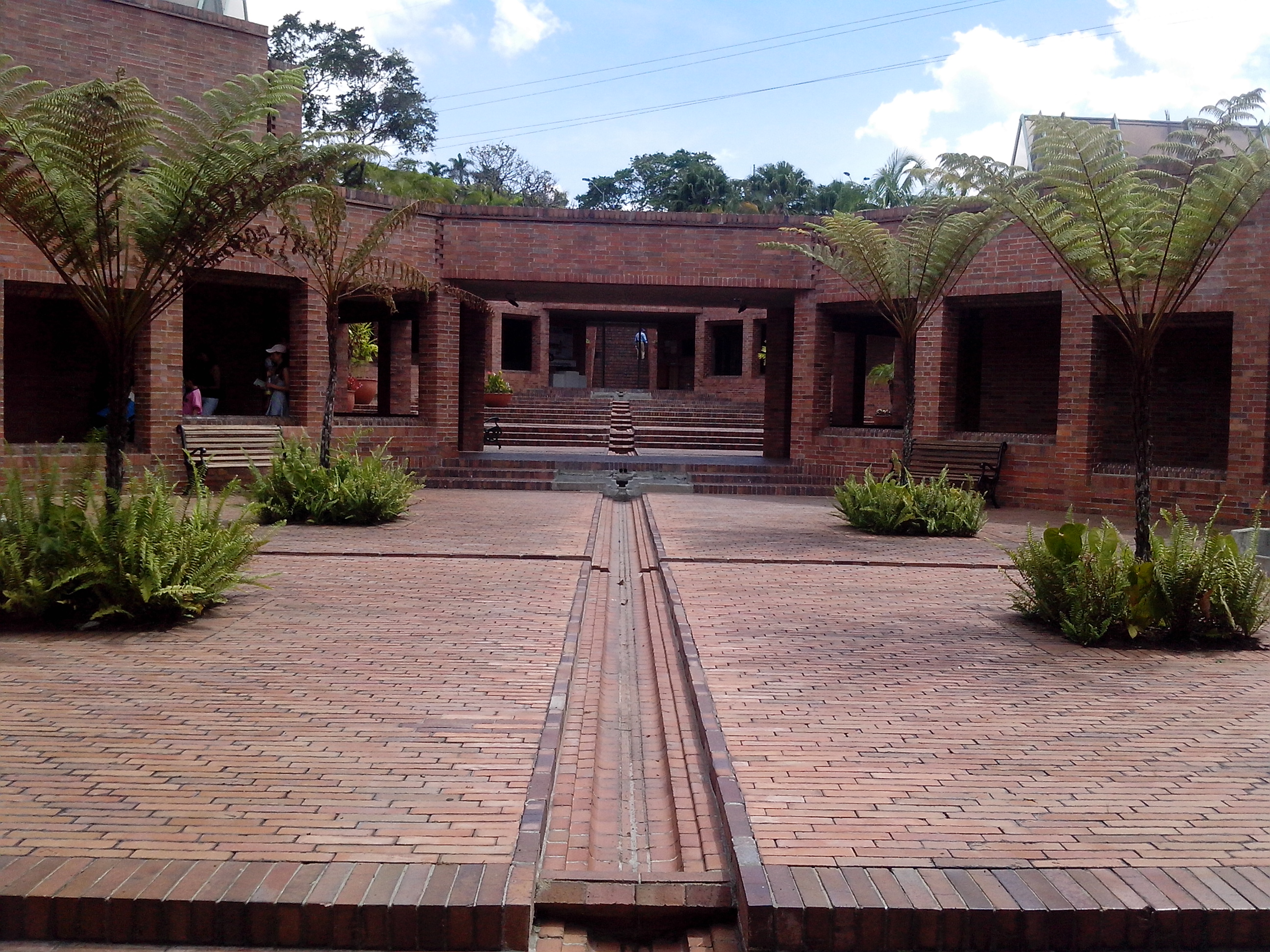
Image of Quimbaya Museum

Quimbaya Museum is a museum located in Armenia, Colombia designed by Colombian Architect Rogelio Salmona. It displays a large collection of pre-Columbian artcrafts: about 390 gold objects, 104 pieces of pottery, 22 stone sculptures, carved woods, and other objects, mainly from the pre-Columbian Quimbaya civilization, Embera and some other amerindian tribes. Some of the most important pieces are the gold Poporos (traditional gadgets for chewing coca leaves) and the zoomorphic vases.

Most of the pieces have been preserved by experts from Gold Museum of Bogotá. Together with other pottery, stone, shell, wood and textile archaeological objects, these items, made of what to indigenous cultures was a sacred metal, testify to the life and thought of different societies which inhabited what is now known as Colombia before contact was made with Europe.

The Bank of the Republic began helping to protect the archaeological patrimony of Colombia in 1939. The Gold Museum and the Quimbaya Museum are some of its main achievements.
