= El Heraldo (Colombia) =

Daily newspaper in Barranquilla, Colombia

- Front page of El Heraldo, 20 September 2010.
- Type: Daily newspaper
- Format: Broadsheet
- Founder(s): Juan Fernández Ortega, Luis Eduardo Manotas Llinás, Alberto Pumarejo Vengoechea
- Publisher: Editorial El Heraldo S.A.
- Editor-in-chief: Ivan Bernal Marín
- Opinion editor: Rosario Borrero
- Founded: 28 October 1933
- Language: Spanish
- Headquarters: Calle 53B # 46-25; Barranquilla, Atlántico, Colombia
- ISSN: 0122-6142
- OCLC number: 20412212
- Website: www.elheraldo.co

El Heraldo (English: The Herald) is a regional newspaper based in the city of Barranquilla, Colombia, founded in 1933 by Juan Fernández Ortega, Luis Eduardo Manotas Llinás, and Alberto Pumarejo Vengoechea. It is the third highest circulating newspaper in Colombia mostly covering the area of the Colombian Caribbean Region and other main cities in the country.
