= RCN Radio =

Radio network in Colombia

- Colombia
- Broadcast area: Bogotá
- Frequency: 770 kHz 93.9 MHz
- Branding: HJJX, HJVC

Programming
- Format: News / talk
- Affiliations: RCN Televisión

Ownership
- Owner: Organización Ardila Lülle

History
- First air date: 1929 (as La voz de Barranquilla; 1932 (as Colombia Broadcasting); 1935 (as Emisora Nueva Granada)
- Former call signs: HJKL
- Former frequencies: 610 kHz

Links
- Website: rcnradio.com

RCN Radio (Radio Cadena Nacional, "National Radio Network") is one of the main radio networks in Colombia. Founded in 1949 with the integration of Radio Pacífico (Cali), La Voz de Medellín and Emisora Nueva Granada (Bogotá).

Carlos Ardila Lülle is its main shareholder since 1973.

== History ==
It was founded on May 17, 1948, by Enrique and Roberto Ramírez, owners of Radio Nueva Granada in Bogotá and Radio La Voz in Medellín. These stations, along with Radio Pacífico in Cali, were originally intended to broadcast the first Eucharistic Congress of Cali to both cities. Due to the magnitude of the event, several stations nationwide expressed interest in broadcasting it. Lacking equipment and funding, the Ramírez brothers proposed uniting all the stations under the name "Radio Cadena Nacional" (National Network Radio) to broadcast the Congress with a single microphone to the entire country via repeaters.

Enrique Ramírez acquired the first 250-watt FM transmitter in Colombia and moved it to Monserrate Hill in Bogotá, as well as the repeaters for Radio Nueva Granada in Medellín and Manizales.

In 1947, the Antioquian textile company Fabricato acquired 50% of the station.

In 1948, the station installed antennas to connect Cali with the network's broadcasts, which eventually reached Bucaramanga.

Following the Bogotazo (the riots in Bogotá), the government ordered the closure of several Radio Cadena Nacional stations and forced the network to censor its political stance, eliminating all political programming. Finally, the network was compelled to shift its focus to entertainment, featuring radio dramas and live artistic performances. Later, the radio station introduced sports broadcasts such as the Tour of Colombia and matches from the Colombian First Division and the FIFA World Cup under the name "Fútbol RCN." Some matches were linked to the Antena 2 station, and in Barranquilla, Radio Uno broadcast Colombian soccer and matches of the Colombian National Team. In the rest of the coastal cities, Radio Uno broadcast only the Colombian National Team matches.

This station was also linked to Rumba Estéreo and La Cariñosa.

Since July 17, 2023, the news service of RCN Radio's main network merged with La FM to operate under the name "La FM de RCN," under the direction of Luis Carlos Vélez.

On October 4, 2024, Luis Carlos Vélez stepped down as director of La FM following the controversy generated by his statements regarding the COP16 and the coverage provided by the regional channel Telepacífico. As of October 7, the direction of the "La FM News" was assumed by Juan Lozano.

The RCN Radio Basic Network ceased broadcasting on August 1, 2025, at midnight, after the end of the program "Nocturna RCN," following more than 75 years of continuous transmission. It was replaced by La FM Plus, which began broadcasting on two RCN Radio frequencies, one Fantástica frequency, and one Radio Uno Bucaramanga frequency.

On August 4, 2025, RCN Radio implemented a nationwide reorganization of its network of stations. La FM became the company's flagship network. The latter gradually took over the frequencies of the former station, mostly on FM. Meanwhile, the station Alerta (radio station) Alerta replaced La Cariñosa on all its frequencies and also began broadcasting on some RCN Radio AM repeaters. Other stations such as Radio Red and Radio Cristal will begin rebroadcasting Radio Uno's programming in their respective cities.

== Networks and radioformulas ==
=== Current Radio Stations ===
==== General Interest Radio Stations ====
The programming of these stations prioritizes news, analysis, and community service content. Some of them complement their programming with music segments.

Station	Style	Format
La FM	National	AM, FM, DTT and Internet
Alerta	Local and Regional	AM, FM, DTT and Internet

==== Music Stations ====
The content of these stations is mostly based on music. It is sometimes supplemented with short audience interaction segments or brief news reports.

Station	Style	Format
La FM Plus	Adult Contemporary	FM, DTT and Internet
Radio Uno	Crossover	AM, FM, DTT and Internet
La Mega	Youth	FM, DTT and Internet
El Sol	Salsa and tropical	AM, FM and Internet

=== Defunct Radio Stations ===
Station	Period of Operation
Emisora Nueva Granada	1935–1989
Radio Pacífico	1942–1983
La Voz de la Sabana	1976–1981
Emisora Monserrate	1978–1983
Radio El Sol	1981–1989
Radio Horizonte	1982–1987
Radio Tequendama	1982–1991
Barranquilla Estéreo	1982–1993
Radio Internacional	1991–1994
Radio Palonegro	N/A
610 Bolero	1994–2000; 2006–2008
Radio Mundial	1973–1987
Bolero Stereo	2008–2010
Rumba Estéreo	1987–2025
Antena 2 Plus	2014
Amor Stereo	1982–2025
Fiesta	2005–2025
Radio Fantástica	2011–2025
RCN Radio Cadena Básica	1948–2025
La Cariñosa	2000–2025

=== Radio stations affiliated with RCN Radio ===
Name	City	Department	AM Frequency (License Plate)	FM Frequency (Platform)
La Voz del Chocó	Quibdó	Chocó	1150 HJTE	
Brisas del San Juan	Istmina	Chocó		106.3 HJB34
La Voz de la Dorada	La Dorada	Caldas	1380 HJLG	
La Voz de los Araucanos	Arauca	Arauca	1110 HJGP	
Marandua Stereo	San José del Guaviare	Guaviare		100.7 HJM41
Buturama Stereo	Aguachica	Cesar		101.7 HJC31
La Reina	Mocoa	Putumayo		106.3 HJB45
Diamante Stereo	San Francisco	Putumayo		90.3 HJC43
Ke Buena	Orito	Putumayo		100.3 HJO70
Ecos del Catatumbo	Tibú	Norte de Santander		99.7 HJO61
Marandúa Stereo	Puerto López	Meta		101.3 HJN38
Jazmar Estéreo	Villeta	Cundinamarca		101.3 HJXC
Radio Las Lajas	Ipiales	Nariño		103.9 HJF43
La Reina FM	Garzón	Huila		93.6 HJAB
La Fiera FM Stereo	Timaná	Huila		92.3 HJC45

Through digital terrestrial television in Colombia, RCN Radio was available on channel 15.5, now occupied by FM. In addition, it was distributed by subscription television providers such as DirecTV on channel 991 and Claro TV on channel 852.

By decision of RCN Radio management at the end of 2019, the frequencies in the cities of Apartadó (Antioquia) 1310 AM, Florencia (Caquetá) 1440 AM, La Dorada (Caldas) 1080 AM, and Barbosa (Santander) 1140 AM were discontinued and returned to the State through the Ministry of Information and Communications Technologies (Ministry of ICT).

In Tuluá (Valle del Cauca), the 1170 AM frequency was assigned to La Cariñosa on October 1, 2024, as its original frequency, 1560 AM, was returned to the State through the Ministry of Information and Communications Technologies (Ministry of ICT). Additionally, in Bogotá, Sincelejo (Sucre, Colombia), Sogamoso (Boyacá), Buenaventura (Valle del Cauca), and Barrancabermeja (Santander, Colombia), the stations ceased broadcasting on October 3, 2024. The frequencies 1340 AM (Sincelejo), 1200 AM (Sogamoso), 1340 AM (Buenaventura), 1320 AM (Barrancabermeja), 1340 AM (Amor Años Maravillosos), and 89.7 FM (Radio Fantástica) were returned to the State through the Ministry of Information and Communications Technologies (ICT).

On December 30, 2025, by decision of the RCN Radio management, the signal of Antena 2 was broadcast for the last time, in addition to several frequencies of the former systems of the Basic Network and La Cariñosa in Bogotá 650 AM, Medellín (Antioquia) 670, 990 and 1140 AM, Cali (Valle del Cauca) 1030 and 1230 AM, Barranquilla (Atlántico) 1400 AM, Bucaramanga (Santander) 800 AM, Cúcuta (Norte de Santander) 1210 AM, Manizales (Caldas) 1450 AM, Pereira (Risaralda) 1210 AM, Armenia (Quindío) 1400 AM, Girardot (Cundinamarca) 1290 AM, San Andrés Islands 910 AM, Valledupar (Cesar) 1260 AM, and Villavicencio (Meta) 1110 AM, which were returned to the State through the Ministry of ITC.

== RCN Radio Basic Network former frequencies ==
City	Department	AM frequency	FM frequency
Bogotá	Cundinamarca	770	93.9
Medellín	Antioquia	990	94.4
Cali	Valle del Cauca	980	98.0
Barranquilla	Atlántico	760	
Bucaramanga	Santander	800	
Pereira	Risaralda	1020	
Cartagena	Bolívar	1000	
Santa Marta	Magdalena	640	
Cúcuta	Norte de Santander	940	
Manizales	Caldas	1060	
Armenia	Quindío	1240	
Pasto	Nariño	1340	
Popayán	Cauca	1370	
Ibagué	Tolima	1180	
Tunja	Boyacá	1380	
Villavicencio	Meta	1110	
San Andrés	San Andrés, Providencia and Santa Catalina	910	
Valledupar	Cesar	1260	
Montería	Córdoba	1120	
Florencia (Radio Uno Florencia)	Caquetá	1440	
Sincelejo	Sucre	1340	
Yopal (La Voz de Yopal)	Casanare	750	
Arauca (La Voz del Río Arauca)	Arauca	1110	
Riohacha (Rumba St. Riohacha)	La Guajira		93.7
San Juan del Cesar (La Voz de la Provincia de Padilla)	La Guajira	1530	
Quibdó (La Voz del Chocó)	Chocó	1150	
Mocoa (Putumayo Stereo)	Putumayo		106.3
San José del Guaviare (La Voz del Guaviare)	Guaviare	1180	
Girardot	Cundinamarca	1290	
Barbosa	Santander	1140	
San Gil	Santander	1220	
Sogamoso	Boyacá	1200	
La Dorada (Radio Uno La Dorada)	Caldas	1080	
Ipiales (Radio Las Lajas)	Nariño	1160	
Puerto Asís (Putumayo Stereo)	Putumayo		101.6
Rionegro	Antioquia	1370	
Apartadó	Antioquia	1310	
Tuluá	Valle del Cauca	1170	
Neiva (La Radio)	Huila	1150	
Neiva (La F.M.)	Huila	1100	
Neiva (La Cariñosa)	Huila	1340	
Neiva (La Mega Stereo)	Huila		90.3
La Plata (Global Stereo)	Huila		96.8
Garzón (La Reina)	Huila		93.6
Garzón (La Cariñosa)	Huila	1490	
Garzón (Sabambú Fm)	Huila		88.8
Timaná (La Fiera)	Huila		92.3
Tumaco (Rumba St. Tumaco)	Nariño		91.1
Granada (La voz de la Conquista)	Meta		103.3
Barrancabermeja (La Cariñosa)	Santander	1320	
Buga (Voces del Occidente)	Valle del Cauca	860	
Cartago (Radio Robledo)	Valle del Cauca	1580	
Aguachica (La Voz de Aguachica)	Cesar	1330	
Sipí (Brisas del San Juan)	Chocó		106.3
Pacho (Radio Dulce)	Cundinamarca		106.3

It also operates affiliate stations in Tame (Tame FM Stereo), Ocana, Mariquita (Ondas del Gualí), Puerto Lopez (Marandúa Stereo).

== Partner radio stations ==
- Radio Mitre Argentina
- Radio Programas del Perú Peru
- Radio Panamericana Bolivia
- Univisión Radio United States
- Cadena Radial Ecuatoriana Ecuador
- Radio Cope Spain
- Radio Caracas Radio Venezuela

== International partner agencies ==
- Associated Press
- EFE
