= General Archive of the Nation (Colombia) =

- Archivo General de la Nación
- Logo of the General Archive.

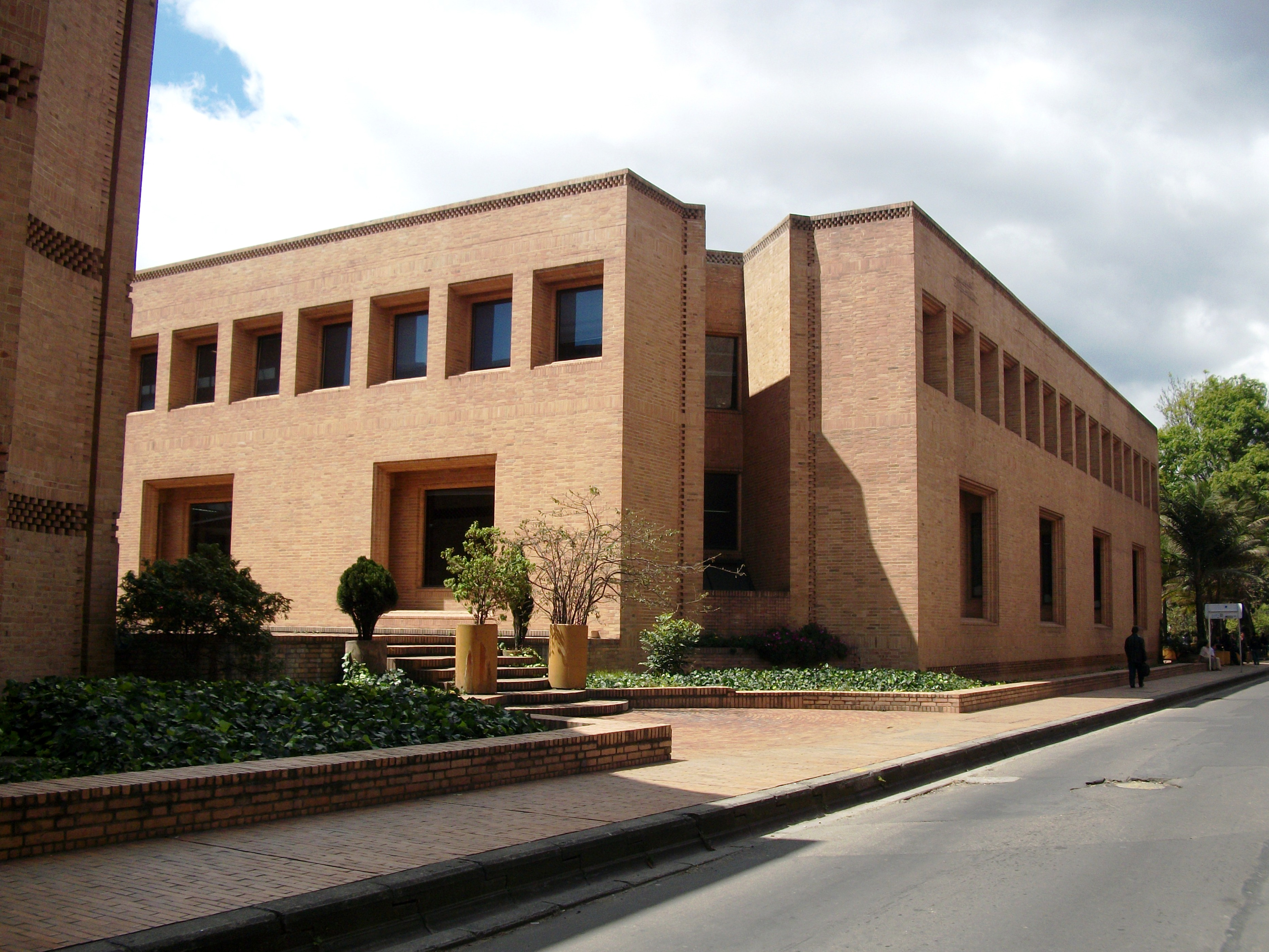
- Headquarters of the General Archive.

Agency overview
- Formed: 22 December 1989
- Headquarters: Carrera 6 No. 6-91 Bogotá, D.C., Colombia; 4°35′38.17″N 74°4′36.84″W
- Annual budget: COP$15,322,278,768 (2011); COP$18,537,174,113 (2012); COP$18,916,749,945 (2013)
- Agency executive: Director
- Parent agency: Ministry of Culture
- Website: www.archivogeneral.gov.co

The General Archive of the Nation (Spanish: Archivo General de la Nación) is a Colombian government agency ascribed to the Colombian Ministry of Culture charged with "conserving the historical legacy, as well as recovering and circulating the documentary heritage of the country". It is the head of the National System of Archives. The headquarters are located in the city of Bogotá and was designed by the architect Rogelio Salmona.

== Contents ==
The archive contains historical documents that date from 1541 to 1991. These documents include constitutional policies, notarized documents, judicial documents from colonial times, letters from famous historical figures such as Simón Bolívar, and historical maps of the New Kingdom of Granada. The collections has documents from all periods of the history of the Americas, from the conquest to the present day. In addition to material from Colombia, the archive has documents from the territories that formed the New Kingdom of Granada as well as from the later countries of Gran Colombia, Venezuela, Panama, and Ecuador. There are also documents from Central America, Peru, and Chile. A collection of documents titled "Negros y Esclavos" (Blacks and Slaves) was added by UNESCO to its Memory of the World international register in 2005.

== See also ==
- List of national archives
