= Organización Ardila Lülle =

Colombian business conglomerate

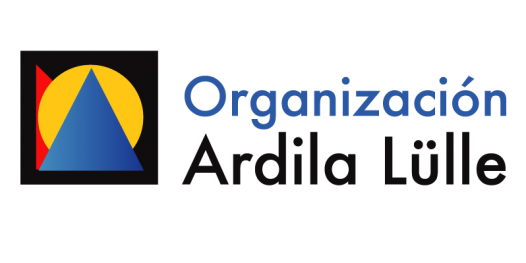
- Logo used since 2024
- Type: Conglomerate
- Industry: Media conglomerate
- Founded: 1951; 75 years ago
- Founder: Carlos Ardila Lülle
- Headquarters: Avenida La Playa # 47-42, Edificio Coltejer, Centro, Medellín, Colombia
- Products: Television; Radio; Soft drinks; Food
- Website: www.oal.com.co

Organización Ardila Lülle is one of the most important conglomerates in Colombia. After positioning his company in the beverage sector, Carlos Ardila Lülle founded and consolidated the Organización Ardila Lülle, today comprising over 80 companies with more than 40,000 employees in Colombia, producing goods and services in sectors as diverse as communications, beverages, textiles, and entertainment.

== Subsidiaries ==
=== Beverage sector ===
Company	Activity	Country
Central Cervecera de Colombia	Drinks	Colombia
Postobón	Drinks	Colombia
Bilac	Drinks	Colombia

=== Food sector ===
Compañía	Actividad	País
Bary	Food, snacks, sauces and condiments sector	Colombia
Nutrium	Food sector	Colombia
TOSTAO' Café & Pan	Bakery and cafeteria sector	Colombia

=== Communications sector ===
Company	Activity	Country
RCN Televisión S.A.	Television	Colombia
RCN Nuestra Tele Internacional	Television	International
Win Sports	Television	Colombia
Win Play	Sports online	International
RCN Total	Internet Television	International
RCN Radio S.A.	Radio	Colombia
RCN Radio	Internet Radio	Colombia
Music RCN	Music Studies	Colombia
Estudios RCN	Television production company	Colombia
RCN Comerciales	Production of Television Commercials	Colombia
La República	Newspaper	Colombia

=== Agro-industrial sector ===
Compañía	Actividad	País
Incauca	Agro-industrial	Colombia
Ingenio Providencia	Agro-industriall	Colombia
Ingenio Risaralda	Agro-industrial	Colombia
Núcleos de Colombia S.A.	Agro-industrial	Colombia
Sucroal S.A.	Agro-industrial	Colombia
Ciamsa	Agro-industrial	Colombia

=== Coffee sector ===
Company	Activity	Country
Café Kumanday	Coffee maker	Colombia

=== Automotive sector ===
Company	Activity	Country
Los Coches S.A. (dealership for MG Cars, Hyundai, Volkswagen, Renault, Ram, Seat, Cupra, Volvo, Peugeot, Fiat, Honda, Foton Motor, Dodge, Audi, Jeep y Ford)	Automotive	Colombia

=== Sports sector ===
Company	Activity	Country
Atlético Nacional	Football	Colombia

=== Textile and clothing sector ===
Company	Activity	Country
Kaltex Sudamérica	Trade	Colombia

=== Transport sector ===
Company	Activity	Country
Edinsa	Transport	Colombia

=== Others ===
Company	Activity	Country
ARESS	Insurance broker	Colombia
IberPlast	Plastics industry	Colombia
Market RCN	Digital store	Colombia
