= El Mundo (Colombia) =

- Type: Weekly newspaper
- Format: Tabloid
- Owner: <Fundación FundaMundo>
- Founder(s): <Darío Arismendi, Raúl Aguilar, and others>
- Founded: April 20, 1979; 47 years ago
- Ceased publication: August 2, 2020; 5 years ago
- Political alignment: Liberal
- Language: Spanish
- Headquarters: Calle 53 #74-50, Medellín
- City: Medellín
- Country: Colombia
- Readership: 20.000
- Website: www.elmundo.com

El Mundo (The World) was a newspaper and news website based in Medellín, Colombia. First published in Antioquia on April 20, 1979, it was founded by a group of business leaders and journalists. After being as a daily newspaper for 39 years, the newspaper switched to a weekly printed edition with daily digital publication in 2018.

== History ==
The newspaper was founded in 1979. It was the first newspaper to have a completely professional and computerized editorial department in Colombia. Darío Arizmendi Posada, one of the founders of the newspaper, was its first director.

Guillermo Gaviria Echeverri became the director and major stake holder of the newspaper in 1991. Under his guidance, the paper recovered from the economic crisis and acquired its higher political relevance, being known for its editorials and the plurality and quality of its columnists. In 2011, he and his wife, Adela Correa de Gaviria founded the non-governmental organization FundaMundo and transferred to it all their shares, making the newspaper the first daily newspaper owned by a foundation in Colombia. His daughter, Irene Gaviria Correa, became the newspaper's director in 2014 after being its chief editor for ten years. Under her administration the paper fully undertook the task to serve FundaMundo's social purpose: to build citizenship skills in its readers through the collaborative work between the press and private and public educational institutions. This program, named "Educating while informing" as of November, 2019, has distributed more than five million newspapers to students in public schools, along with other educational material inserted in the newspaper, and developed more than 250 school newspapers, written by students from the schools after participating in journalism workshops given by journalists from El Mundo.

== See also ==
- El Espectador
- El Tiempo
- El Colombiano
- Semana
