= RCN Televisión =

Colombian television network

Canal RCN
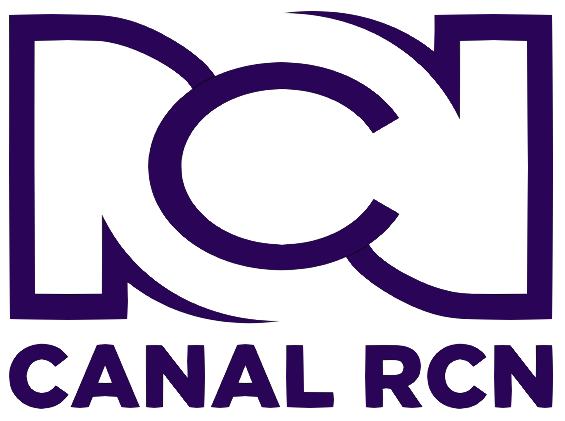
- Type: Free-to-air television network
- Country: Colombia
- Headquarters: Bogotá

Programming
- Language: Spanish
- Picture format: 1080i HDTV (downscaled to 480i for the SDTV feed)

Ownership
- Owner: RCN Televisión (Organización Ardila Lülle)
- Sister channels: NTN24; Win Sports; Win+ Fútbol; RCN Nuestra Tele Internacional; RCN Novelas

History
- Founded: March 23, 1967 (as a television production company)
- Launched: July 10, 1998 (as a television channel)
- Founder: Carlos Ardila Lülle

Links
- Website: www.canalrcn.com

Availability

Terrestrial
- Analog VHF/UHF: Listings may vary
- Digital UHF: Channel 15.1 (HD); Channel 15.2 (HD2); Channel 15.7 (SD)

RCN Televisión, branded as Canal RCN (Radio Cadena Nacional), is a Colombian free-to-air television network owned by Organización Ardila Lülle. It was founded as a television production company on March 23, 1967, and officially launched as an independent channel on July 10, 1998. Its main shareholder is Carlos Ardila Lülle. It produced Yo soy Betty, la fea, one of the most successful Colombian telenovelas.

== History ==
RCN Television was created as a television arm of the RCN Radio network. In 1967, RCN Radio took part in the bidding for spaces in the official television network, getting one hour a day which was split into two series: one made in Colombia named El Hogar (The Home) and the American television series Bewitched. In 1973, RCN Radio and its subsidiary RCN Television were purchased by Carlos Ardila Lülle, who three years later relaunched RCN as a television production company (or programadora) with several spaces into the official channels' schedule. RCN was the first company that broadcast a television program both live and in color, the 1980 Miss Colombia beauty contest; since that year RCN has held the rights to broadcast this event.

=== The 1980s ===
RCN produced television series with high remembrance among viewers like Cusumbo and El Taita in 1984, which was the first Colombian telenovela filmed in exterior locations. In August 1988, RCN became part of OTI Colombia, gaining the rights to broadcast the Olympic Games and the FIFA World Cup. Other members included Caracol, RTI, Producciones PUNCH, Producciones JES and Datos y Mensajes.

=== The 1990s ===
Along with Caracol Televisión and RTI Producciones, RCN became one of the major television production companies in Colombia, producing not only telenovelas and game shows, but also sports events and news. Nevertheless, the telenovelas gave to RCN an outstanding recognition, first in Latin America and in places as distant as Vietnam and Hungary. Among this productions were La Potra Zaina, Las Juanas and the international hit Café, con aroma de mujer, which not only have been broadcast in several countries across the globe but have been remade several times, with Destilando Amor being the newest version. Within the telenovelas they produced in the 1990s, there were productions like La Otra Raya del Tigre, La Vorágine, La Casa de las dos Palmas, Azucar, Momposina and Hombres, all of them raising parts of the Colombian culture and showing it to the world.

=== Terrestrial TV Channel ===
==== 1990s ====
On July 10, 1998, RCN went on the air as an independent signal with disastrous results compared to Caracol Televisión, a situation that stabilized when Carlos Ardila Lülle took over the direction of the channel.

Its first broadcast of the channel began at 9:00 pm with the first broadcast of Noticias RCN.

The first telenovela that the channel RCN Televisión premiered was La madre in 1998, starring Margarita Rosa de Francisco and Héctor de Malba and directed by Pepe Sánchez.

==== 2000s ====
In 2000, it began broadcasting its programming 24 hours a day.

In 2002, it premiered its first reality show, which was Protagonistas de novela, hosted by María Cecilia Botero and recorded from Miami, United States.

Upon reaching ten years of its operation as a private channel, Canal RCN's signal reached 97% of the Colombian geography with the launch of 13 stations covering 24 municipalities in Santander, Antioquia, Guaviare, Risaralda, Cundinamarca, Norte de Santander, Boyacá and the State Táchira in Venezuela.

On November 3, 2008, its sister channel called NTN24 went on the air, a channel that broadcasts news 24 hours a day, with spaces for opinion, analysis, economics, sports, entertainment and specialized topics.

As of August 5, 2009, the creation of RCN Novelas, RCN's soap opera channel through the subscription television network, was announced. This is the direct competitor of Novelas Caracol of the company Caracol Televisión.

==== 2010s ====
As of January 2011 and with the arrival of DTT, RCN Televisión began broadcasting in HD.

In 2012, they began to broadcast their first telenovela in HD, which was "Pobres Rico" with the protagonists Juan Pablo Raba and Maria Helena Doering.

On April 30, 2014, RCN Televisión decided to suspend its HD signal transmitted by the main pay television operators in Colombia.

On July 16, 2015, 21st Century Fox announced that it had sold its stake in MundoFox to RCN Televisión, giving full ownership. The president of MundoFox, Herman López stated that the company was proud to have started MundoFox with RCN Televisión and is confident that they will realize the signal's full potential.

On July 28, 2015, MundoFox began to progressively introduce a new identity as MundoMax. The rebrand was officially completed on August 13 of that same year, coinciding with the third anniversary of the launch of the signal. In addition, RCN Televisión announced that it had canceled the network's news broadcasts.

On July 31, 2015, the president of RCN Televisión, Ibra Morales, stated regarding the decision that "although we have canceled Noticias MundoFox, RCN Televisión continues its dedication to bringing quality news coverage to the Hispanic community in the United States, in a vibrant and dynamic way. " RCN Televisión hopes to make MundoMax the most important Hispanic network in the United States in a short time. In 2016, the MundoMax signal was closed, due to low levels of audience ratings and reliability.

In May 2016, two years after the withdrawal of its HD signal from subscription television operators in Colombia, the signal was unified and broadcast in SD and HD with a 16: 9 aspect ratio.

In November of that same year, RCN bought the newspaper La República, the country's first specialized media outlet for economic and business news, which also owns a multimedia television channel.

On March 30, 2017, three years after its withdrawal from the HD signal in several cable operators, the chain reactivated it after a Supreme Court ruling, depending on the country's coverage.

This television network has produced many hits that have been sold around the world, such as: I'm Ugly Betty ; Woman-fragranced Coffee; The Mob's Widow ; Three Miracles ; The Last Happy Marriage; Chepe Fortuna ; The Pola; Clean Hand ; Bride for Two ; The Filly Zaina ; La María ; Francisco the Mathematician , Los Reyes, Until Silver Do Us Part and Sincere Love, among other productions .

In January 2018, it was announced by various means that the channel would be contemplating

=== Private television network ===
In 1995, the Colombian government opened up a bidding for two private television networks, each one operating with one channel. RCN took part of this bidding, getting one of the two licenses, the other went to Caracol Televisión. In 1997, RCN started construction on the infrastructure to launch the television channel. On 10 July 1998, RCN aired for the first time as a private channel. In this first stage, RCN launched two telenovelas -La Madre and Carolina Barrantes- and improved the news bulletins, nevertheless, in the first year, RCN -and Caracol- only had a fraction of the Colombian television audience, because the broadcasting infrastructure was not complete and the production companies which remained in the official channels launched a solid strategy to keep the viewers.

In only the second semester of 1999 and the first one of 2000, RCN and Caracol got to beat the public channels, taking more of the 90 percent of the viewers. RCN's first hits were Francisco El Matemático ("Francisco, the Math Teacher"), a teen-oriented series, which aired on Saturday nights, but thanks to its success was moved to prime time Mondays to Fridays, and El Fiscal (The Prosecutor), an action oriented series.

Since the successes of Francisco El Matemático and El Fiscal, RCN launched successful telenovelas which let it take the first place in the Colombian most watched networks: Me Llaman Lolita ("My Name is Lolita"), and Yo soy Betty, la Fea, that became the most successful telenovela ever in Colombia, topping Café con aroma de mujer. Betty la fea has since had its format and storyline licensed by RCN to multiple broadcasters worldwide in several languages.

Following the international trend, RCN launched in 2003 its first reality show: Protagonistas de Novela, which became the most watched show that year in Colombia, its second season, despite not getting as high ratings as the first season got, kept it in first place in the most watched shows in Colombia. Following Protagonistas de Novelas, RCN launched La Isla de los Famosos (a Colombian version of Survivor), which became the most watched show in RCN in 2004, and the second season named Una Aventura Pirata (A Pirate Adventure) got again the place of most watched show in Colombia. The RCN's telenovelas those years were perceived to be of only middling quality, not until with the launching of Los Reyes (a Colombian version of Argentinian series Los Roldán) and Fernando Gaitan's Hasta que la plata nos separe (Until the Money Divides Us) that a telenovela from RCN got high ratings to become the most watched show in Colombia. But despite those years the telenovelas did not put the network in the first place, the Colombian version of The X Factor did, becoming the number one show in Colombia in 2006, with two seasons, and a third and a fourth named Factor XS, where the competitors are kids instead of adults. RCN gained some criticism against the fact that the network was getting ratings from the use of kids in a reality show, but the parents of the kids dismissed this affirmation.

RCN got a ratings hit with 2007 telenovelas Pura Sangre and La Hija del Mariachi, followed by the 2008 telenovelas, El Último Matrimonio Feliz and Los Protegidos.

In July 2008, RCN became the first TV network in Colombia to offer online domestic English-language news updates under the brand, "RCN News" and RCN News in English. The full news updates would air on RCN's international network, "TV Colombia" in the mornings. They were anchored by Brian Andrews, an American news anchor.

== Programming ==
RCN presently operates on a 22-hour schedule of regular network programming, and its signal is the same throughout the country, with no regional variations in the schedule, which starts in the early morning (4:00 am) with reruns of previously aired telenovelas, the morning is covered with breakfast television (Mañana Express), (Buen día, Colombia), with a break for news, the news returns at 12:30 pm and the rest of the afternoon is taken by domestic and foreign telenovelas until 7:00 pm with the news bulletin, and at 8:00 pm the prime time starts with domestic telenovelas until 10:30 pm; the night schedule is occupied by news and editorial TV shows (i.e. La Noche).
