= La Crónica del Quindío =

- Front page of La Crónica del Quindío, 7 April 2007.
- Type: Daily newspaper
- Format: Broadsheet
- Publisher: La Crónica del Quindío Ltda.
- Editor-in-chief: Miguel Ángel Rojas Arias
- Managing editor: Sandra Cecilia Macías Palacio
- News editor: Javier Leonardo Zúñiga Torres
- Founded: 3 October 1991
- Political alignment: Centre-right
- Language: Spanish
- Headquarters: Calle 9 # 13-50; Armenia, Quindío, Colombia
- ISSN: 0122-297X
- Website: www.cronicadelquindio.com

La Crónica del Quindío (English: The Chronicle of the Quindío) is a regional daily newspaper based in Armenia, Colombia, and founded in 1991. It mostly services the Coffee-Growers Axis region of Colombia.
