= Rogelio Salmona =

Colombian architect

- Born: April 28, 1929; Paris, France
- Died: October 3, 2007 (aged 78); Bogotá, Colombia
- Education: National University of Colombia
- Occupation: architect

Rogelio Salmona (April 28, 1929 – October 3, 2007) was a French Colombian architect. He was noted for his extensive use of red brick in his buildings and for using natural shapes like spirals, radial geometry and curves in his designs. During the latter part of his life, Salmona gained renown thanks to awards like the first prize at the 1986, 1988, and 1990 Colombian Architecture Biennials, and the Alvar Aalto Medal in 2003. His works are highly representative of Colombian architecture at the end of the twentieth century.

== Early life and education ==
Salmona was born in Paris, but moved at an early age to Bogotá, Colombia, where he studied at the French Lyceum Louis Pasteur. Upon graduating, he enrolled in the architecture program at the National University of Colombia, then led by German and Italian architects Leopoldo Rother and Bruno Violi. During Le Corbusier's trip to Colombia in 1947, young Salmona was invited by the great architect to work with him at his atelier in Paris. In 1948, Salmona interrupted his studies in Colombia due to the Bogotazo political revolt and returned to Paris. In France, he worked as draftsman for Le Corbusier for about a decade, assisting in the design of projects like the Marseilles block, the Pilot Plan for Bogotá, Notre Dame du Haut, and Chandigarh. Later, he went on to study the sociology of art with Pierre Francastel, developing a critical vision of modern architecture.

At the end of his long apprenticeship, Salmona traveled to Spain, where he discovered Islamic architecture. The brickwork in Granada, in particular, had a lasting influence on his work. Upon returning to Colombia, Salmona graduated as architect at the Universidad de los Andes in 1962.

== Career ==
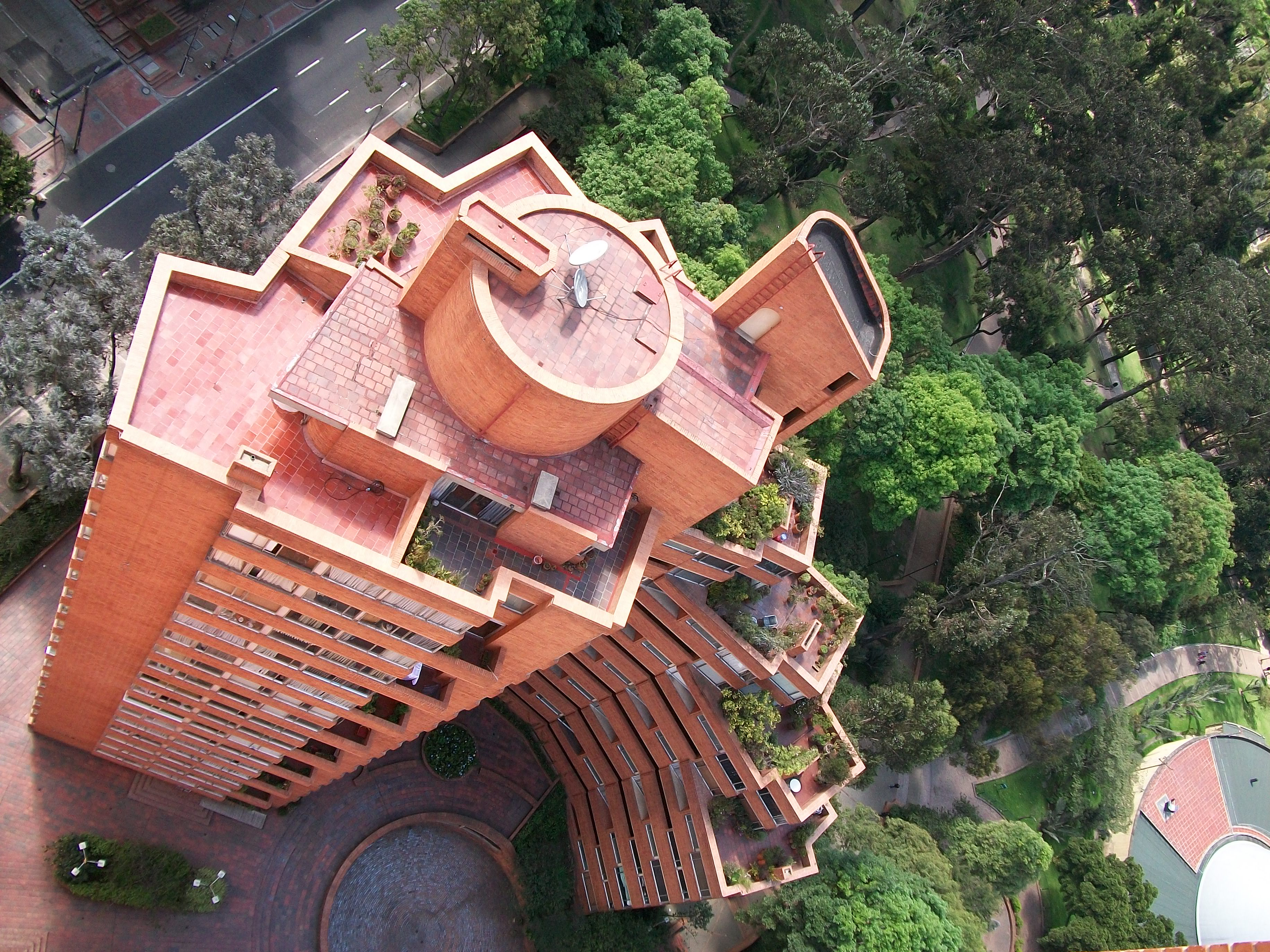
One of the three Torres del Parque (Park Towers) in Bogotá.

Though Salmona traveled widely, enriching his theory of architecture, he spent the rest of his life in Colombia, where he was commissioned to design many important projects (see Public Works, and Private Buildings, below). His first major project was Torres del Parque (1964–70), comprising three residential towers and a park at the center of Bogotá. With its curves and stepped balconies, it is a complex design that many consider his masterpiece. He lived there for the rest of his life.

Other notable buildings include the National University Human Sciences Postgraduate Centre (1995–2000) and the Virgilio Barco Public Library (1999–2001), a landmark in the north of Bogotá.

During the 1980s, Salmona promoted conferences on Latin American architecture in Cali (1980) and Manizales (1987). These seminars contributed to the improvement of the exchange of information among Latin American countries, enriching the architectural dialogue throughout the region.

One of the main characteristics of his work is the conscious and careful use of water, that moves through canals and forms reflective surfaces; in fact Salmona liked to make people realize how difficult human existence was by making all these ponds almost impossible to maintain. Other innovative use of water was the one he proposed using leaks and humidity stains: there is the popular belief (probably not true) that he used to say "one water leak for every room and one loose brick in every floor".

He died from cancer in Bogotá on October 3, 2007.

== Quotes ==
"I am just an architect. Nothing more. Or should I say: somebody who is trying to be one. Because becoming an architect is very difficult. You never know what part of what you do has any validity. Time tells it. Good architecture will become ruins. Bad architecture disappears. But for you to know it is a ruin, you have to wait a lot of time. I hope the [Del Parque] Towers not to be ruins today but one thousand years from now".

"That thing about time being gold is a big stupidity. Time is life. I am interested in living it."

== Public works ==
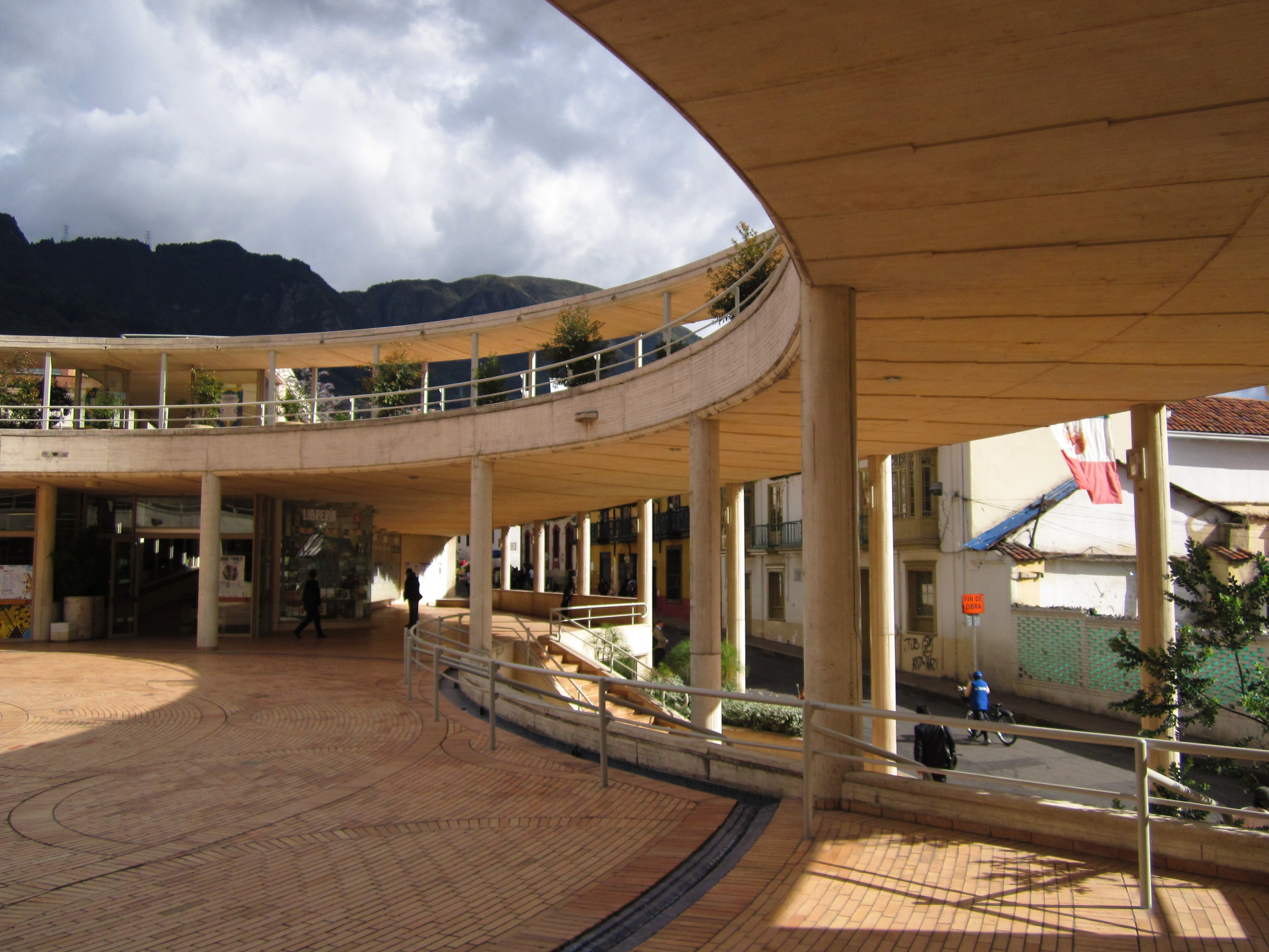
Gabriel García Márquez Cultural Center

- President's House for Illustrious Guests, Cartagena (1978–1981)
- Bogotá Museum of Modern Art (MAMBO), Bogotá (1971–1988)
- Jorge Eliécer Gaitán Center, Bogotá (1980-unfinished)
- National General Archives, Bogotá (1988–1992)
- Graduate School Building (Faculty of Human Sciences) at the National University, Bogotá
- Quimbaya Museum, Armenia (1983–1986)
- FES (Superior Studies Foundation) Headquarters, Cali (1987–1990)
- Vice Presidential House (1994–2005)
- Virgilio Barco Public Library, Bogotá (1999–2001)
- Gabriel García Márquez Cultural Center, Bogotá (2004–2008)

== Private buildings ==
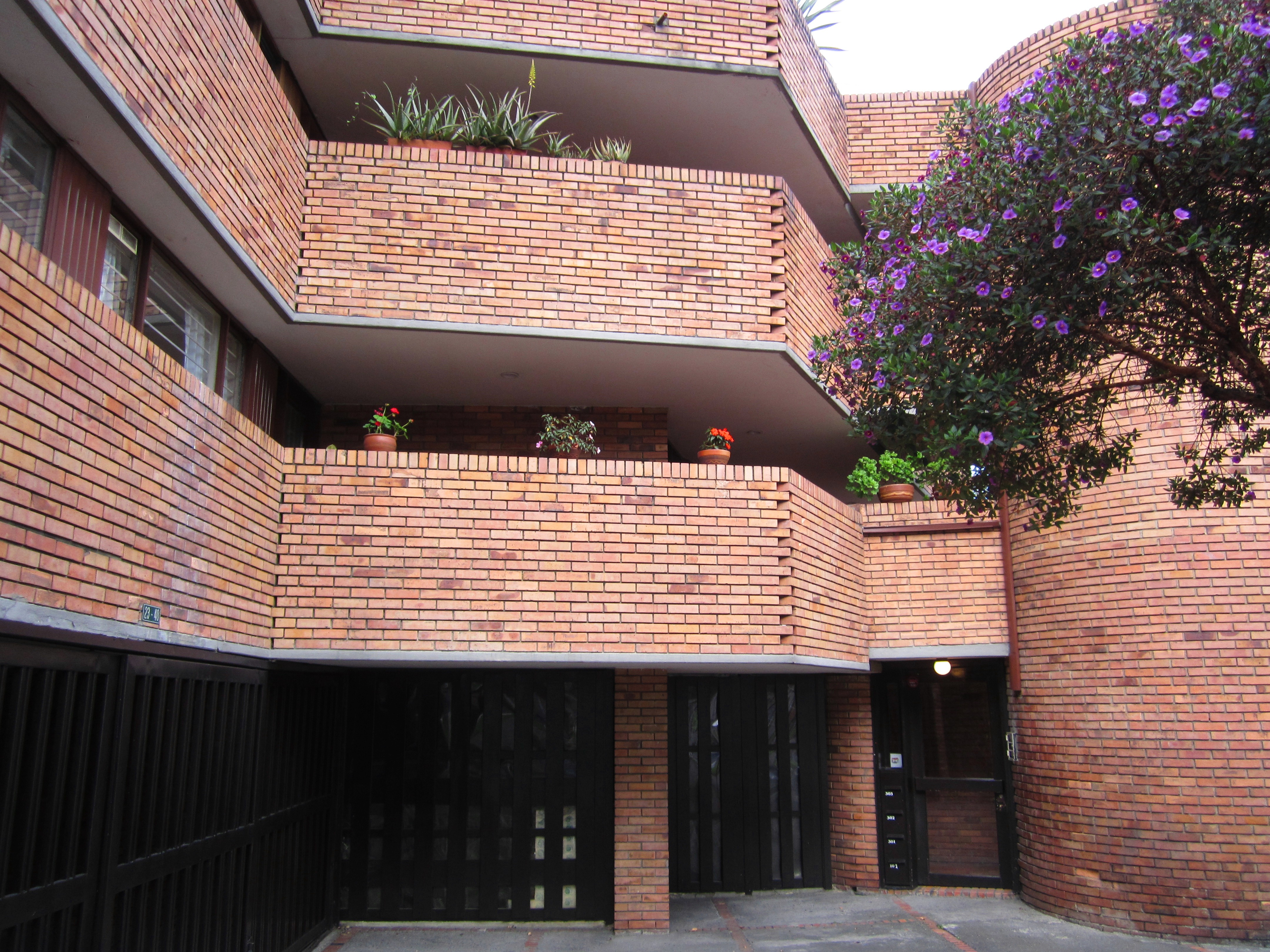
El Polo residential complex

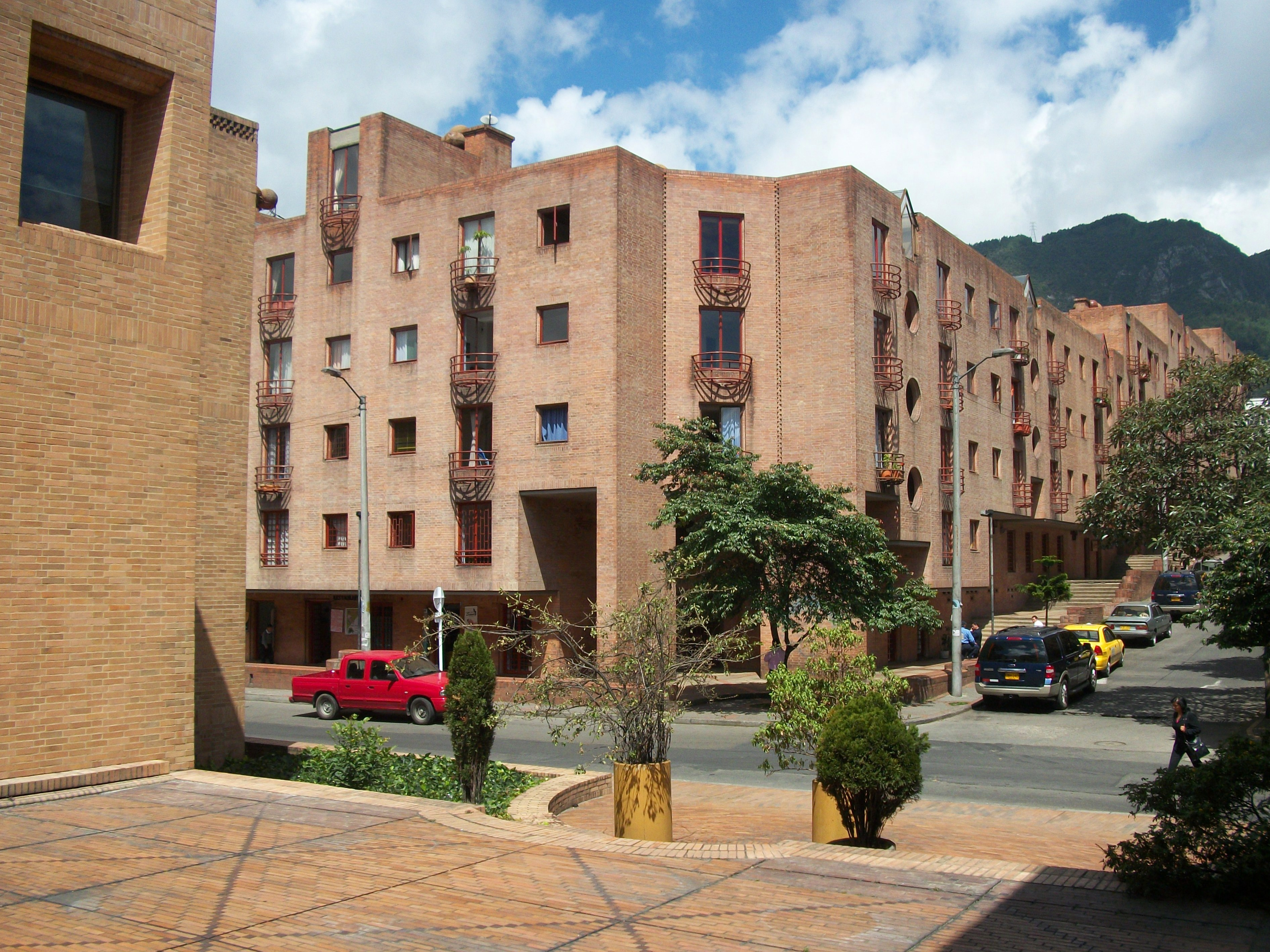
Nueva Santa Fe housing complex and community center

- El Polo residential complex, Bogotá (1959)
- The Headquarters of the Society of Colombian Architects, Bogotá (1961–1970)
- The Free University High School, Bogotá (1962)
- Christian Foundation housing complex, Bogotá (1963)
- Del Parque Towers, Bogotá (1964–1970)
- Alba House, Bogotá (1969, now demolished)
- Alto de Pinos complex (1975–1981)
- Various houses in the Sabana de Bogotá: Casa Puente, Suba (1976); Pasohondo, Tabio (1979); Sotará, Tenjo (1989); and three houses in Cota (1992).
- Nueva Santa Fe housing complex and community center, Bogotá (1985–1994; 1994–1997)
- The Timiza residential complex, Bogotá
- House of the Writer (owned by Gabriel García Márquez), Cartagena (1992–1995)
- Gimnasio Fontana, Guaymaral (1992–2002)
- Riofrío House, Riofrío (1997–2000)
- Alto Chicó Concrete House, Bogotá (2001–2003)
- Altazor House, Torca (2002–2004)
- Chico Norte (owned by Guillermo Gomez Botero), Bogotá, Colombia

== Unfinished projects ==
Together with his wife and partner, María Elvira Madriñán, Salmona worked on a series of future projects, which include:

- French Cultural Center (Alliance Française), Bogotá
- Valmaría Campus (National Pedagogic University), Bogotá
- University Cultural Center (University of Caldas), Manizales
- La Candelaria residential project, Bogotá
- New wing for the MAMBO (Modern Art Museum of Bogotá), Bogotá

Some of these buildings are currently undergoing construction.

== Gallery of works ==
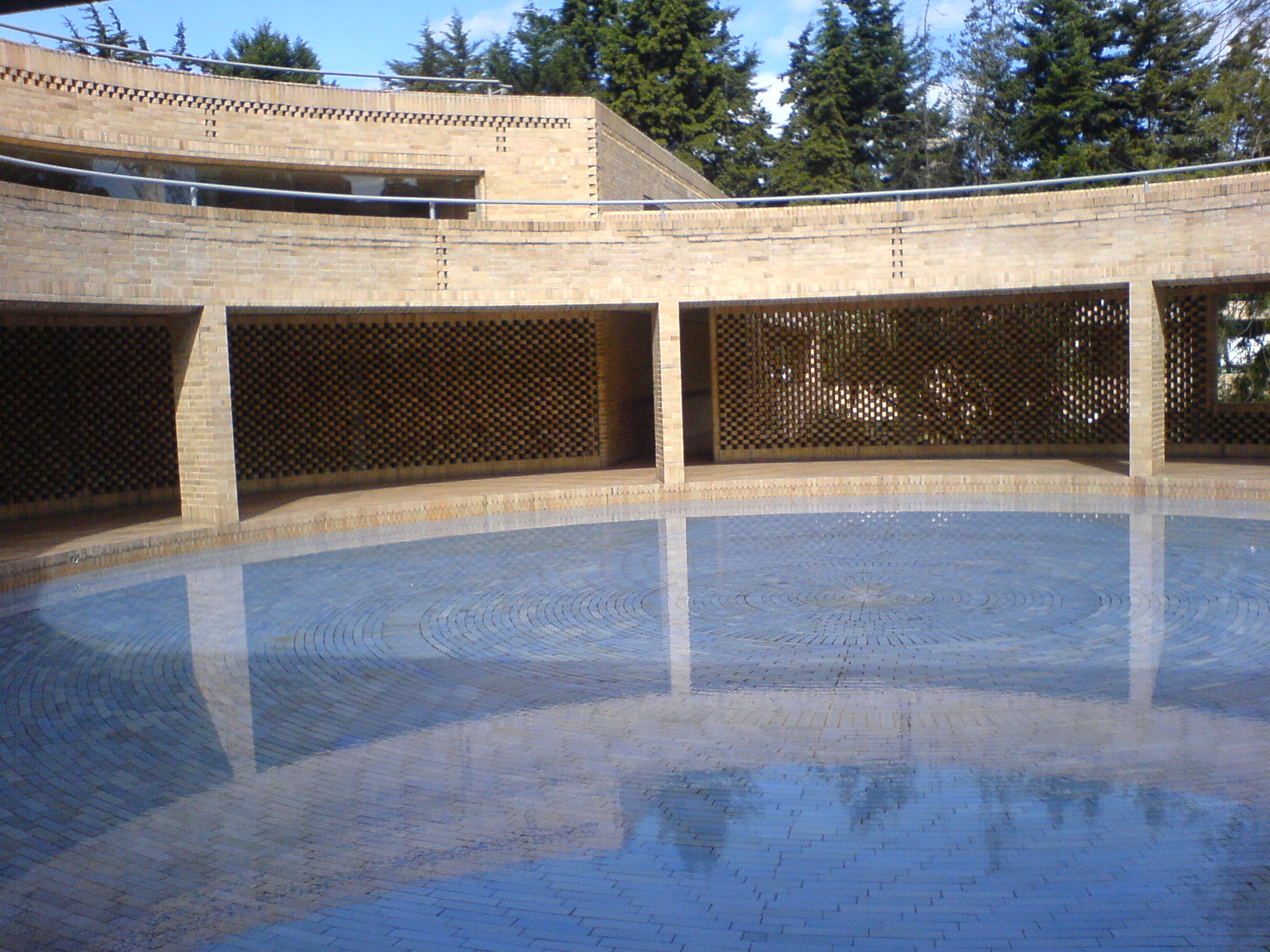
The Graduate School Building of the Faculty of Human Sciences at the National University campus in Bogotá

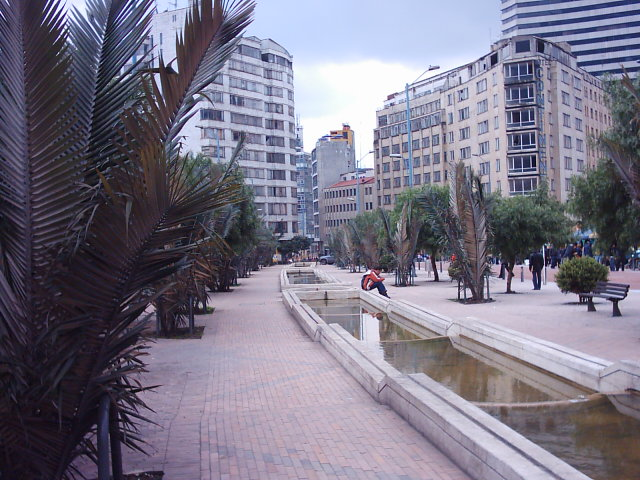
The Environmental Axis along Jiménez Avenue in downtown Bogotá

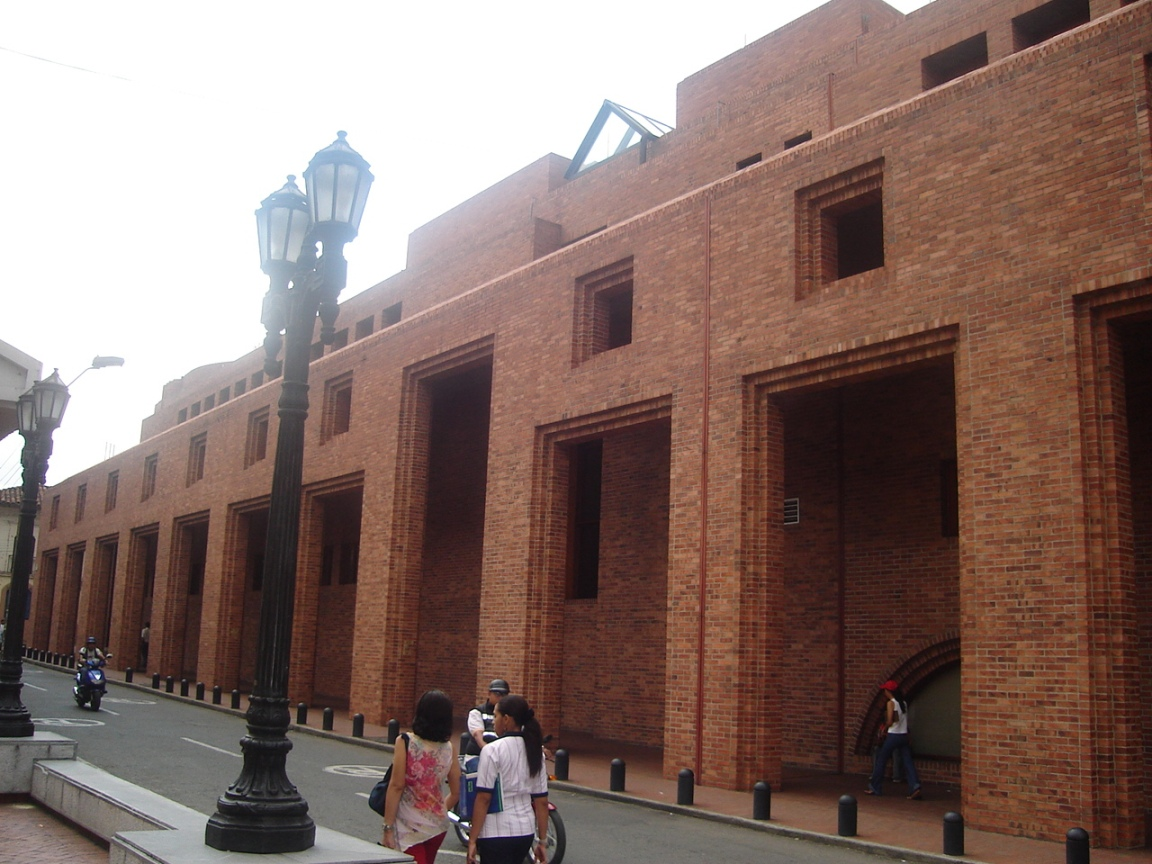
The FES Building in Cali

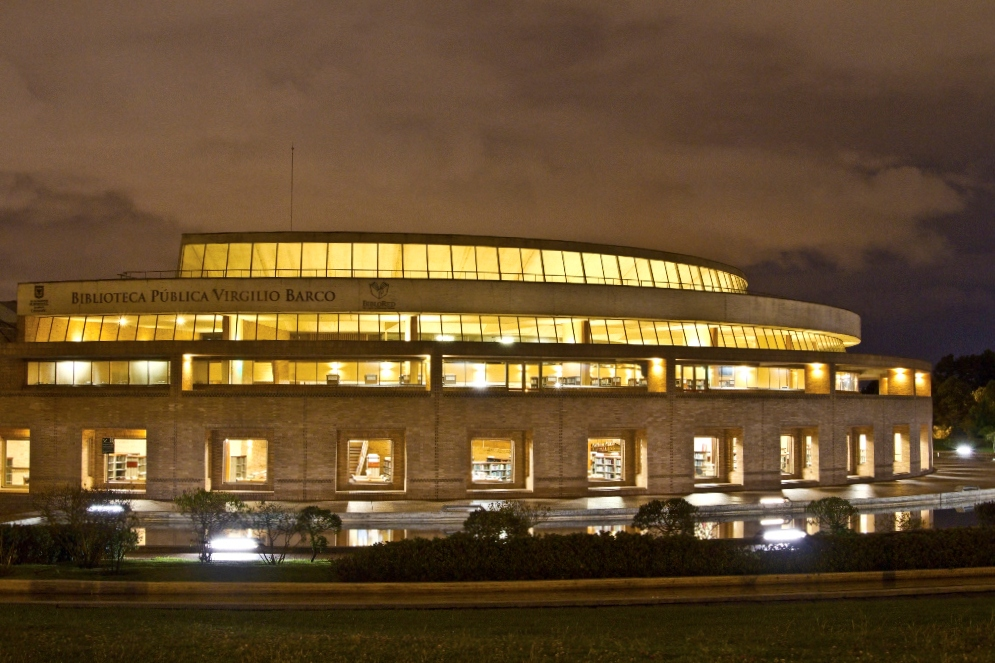
The Virgilio Barco Public Library in Bogotá

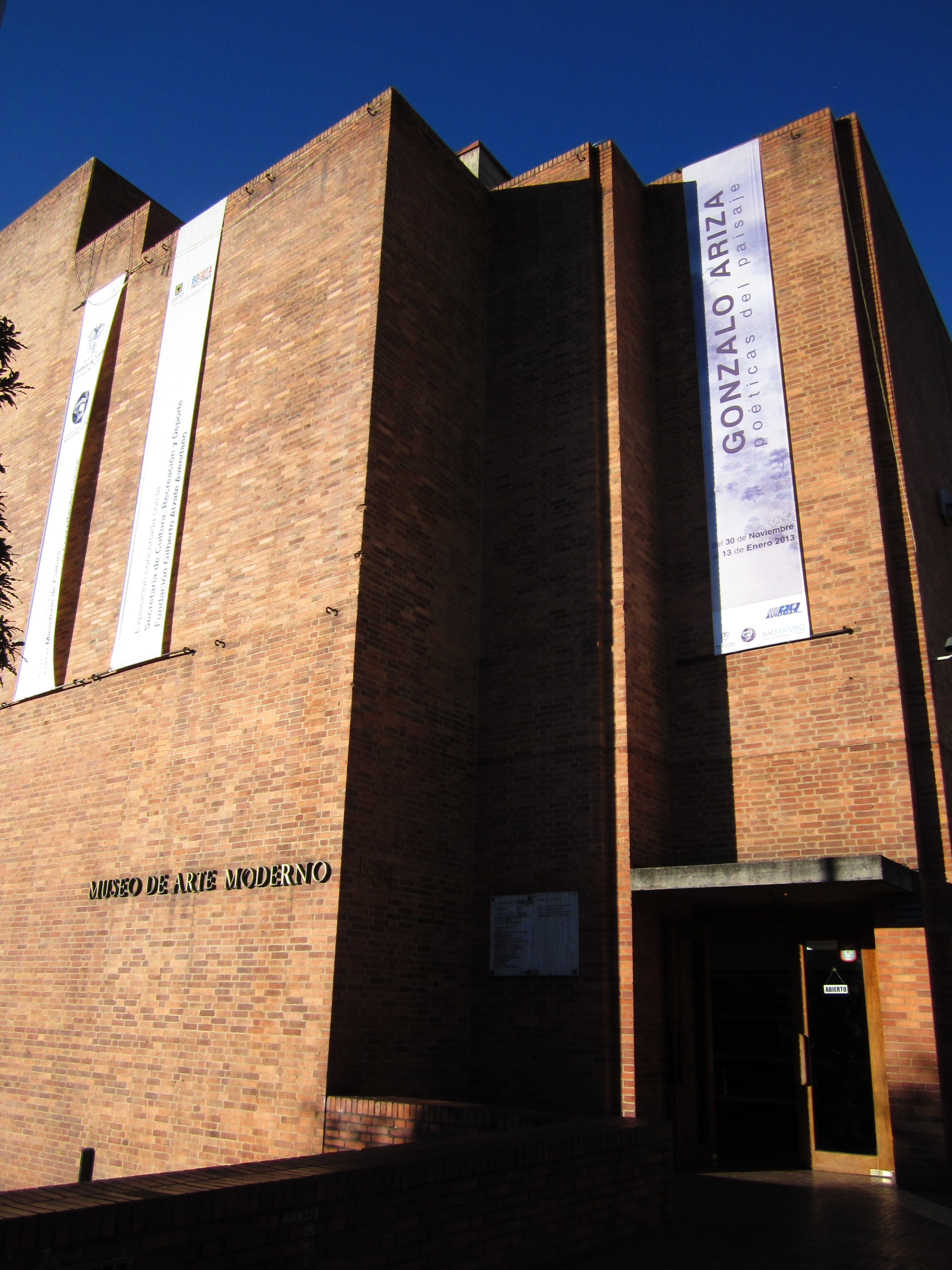
The Museo de Arte Moderno in downtown Bogotá

== Awards ==
- Colombian National Architecture Prize (1986, 1988, and 1990).
- Prince Claus Award (1998)
- Architect of the Americas Award, Panamerican Federation of Architect Associations (1999)
- Professional Trajectory in Architecture Prize II, Iberoamerican Bienal of Architecture and Civil Engineering (2000)
- Alvar Aalto Medal (2003)
- Manuel Tolsá Medal, Autonomous University of México (2004)
- Honorary Fellow of The American Institute of Architects (2006)
- Orden de Boyacá (2006)
- Lápiz de Acero (2007)

== Tribute ==
On 28 April 2021, Google celebrated his 92nd birthday with a Google Doodle.

== Foundation ==
In 2009, the Rogelio Salmona Foundation was created with the purpose of preserving the legacy of the Architect, to preserve the archive of plans and drawings of the projects. At the same time, since 2014 they have organized the Rogelio Salmona Latin American Architecture Prize, which seeks "identify and reward architectural works in Colombia, Latin America and the Caribbean, immersed in a particular urban context, that have evidently generated significant, open and collective spaces, which thus contribute to the creation or improvement of coexistence between inhabitants within your community or city".
