= Armenia, Colombia =

Armenia
- City
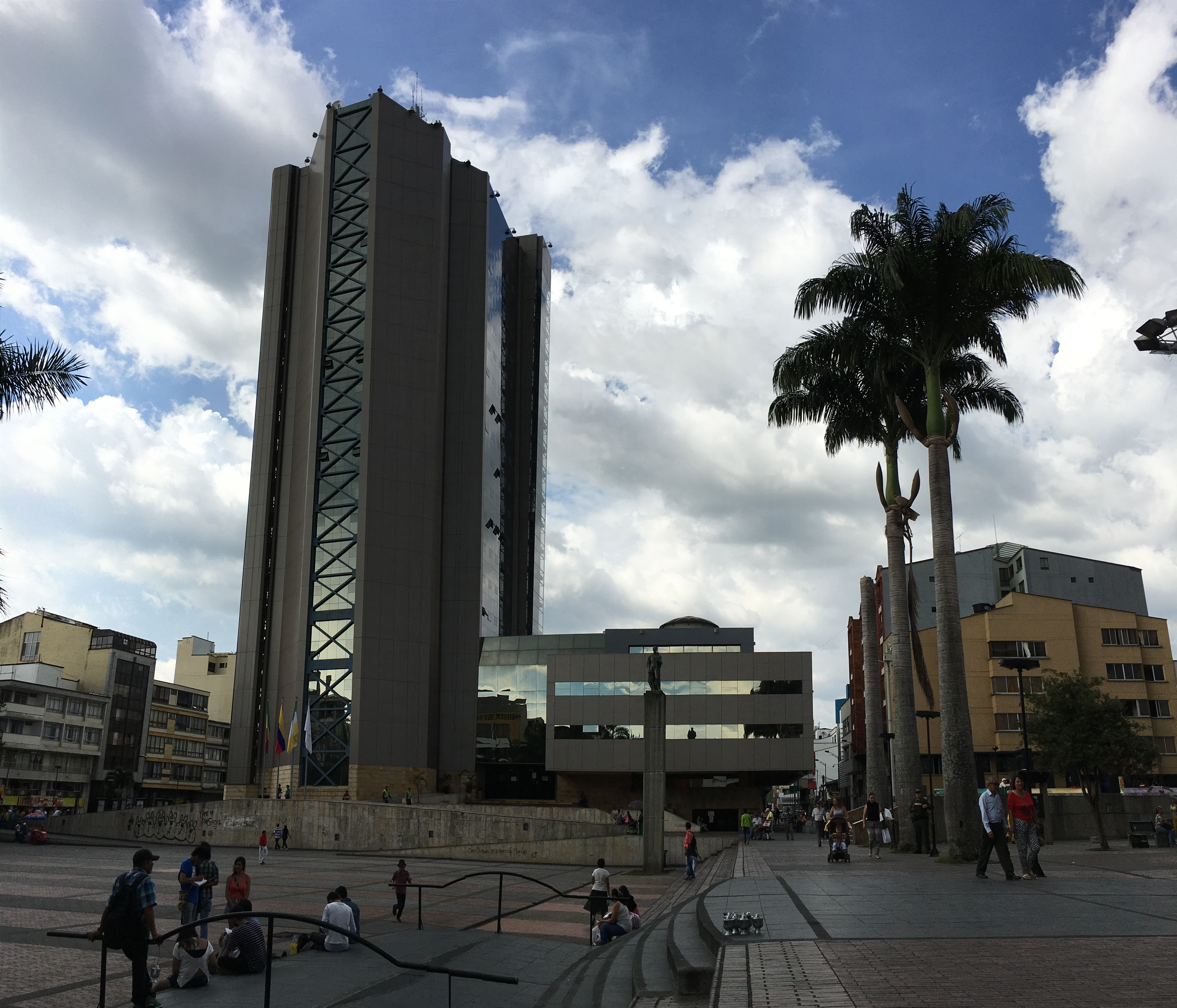
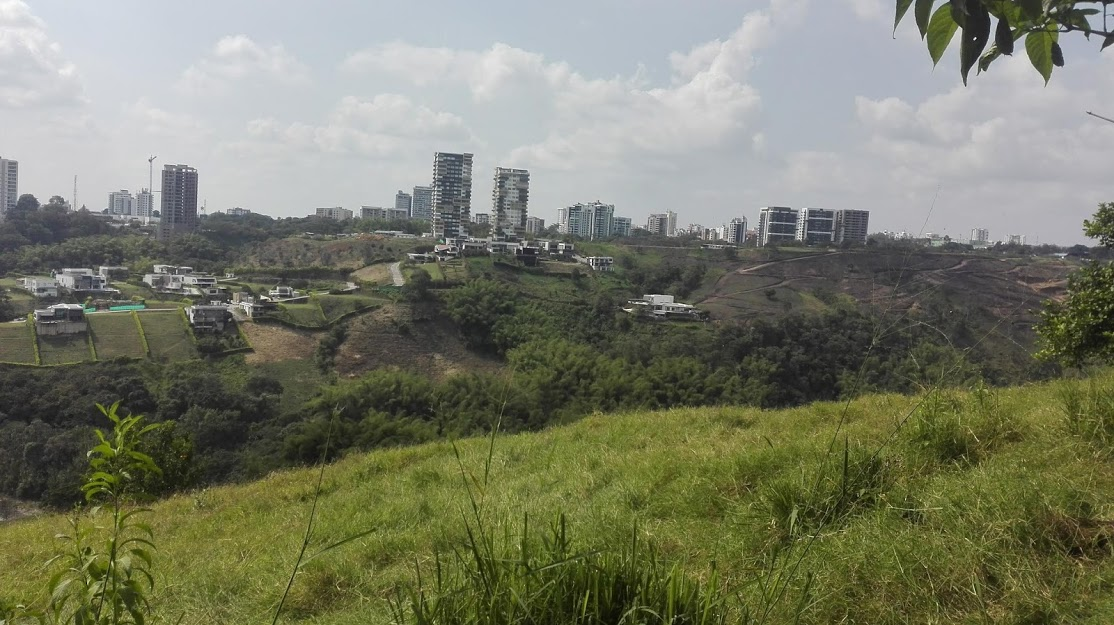
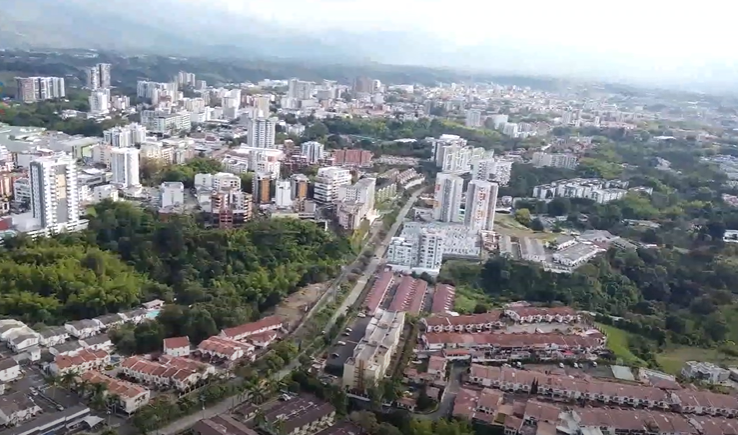
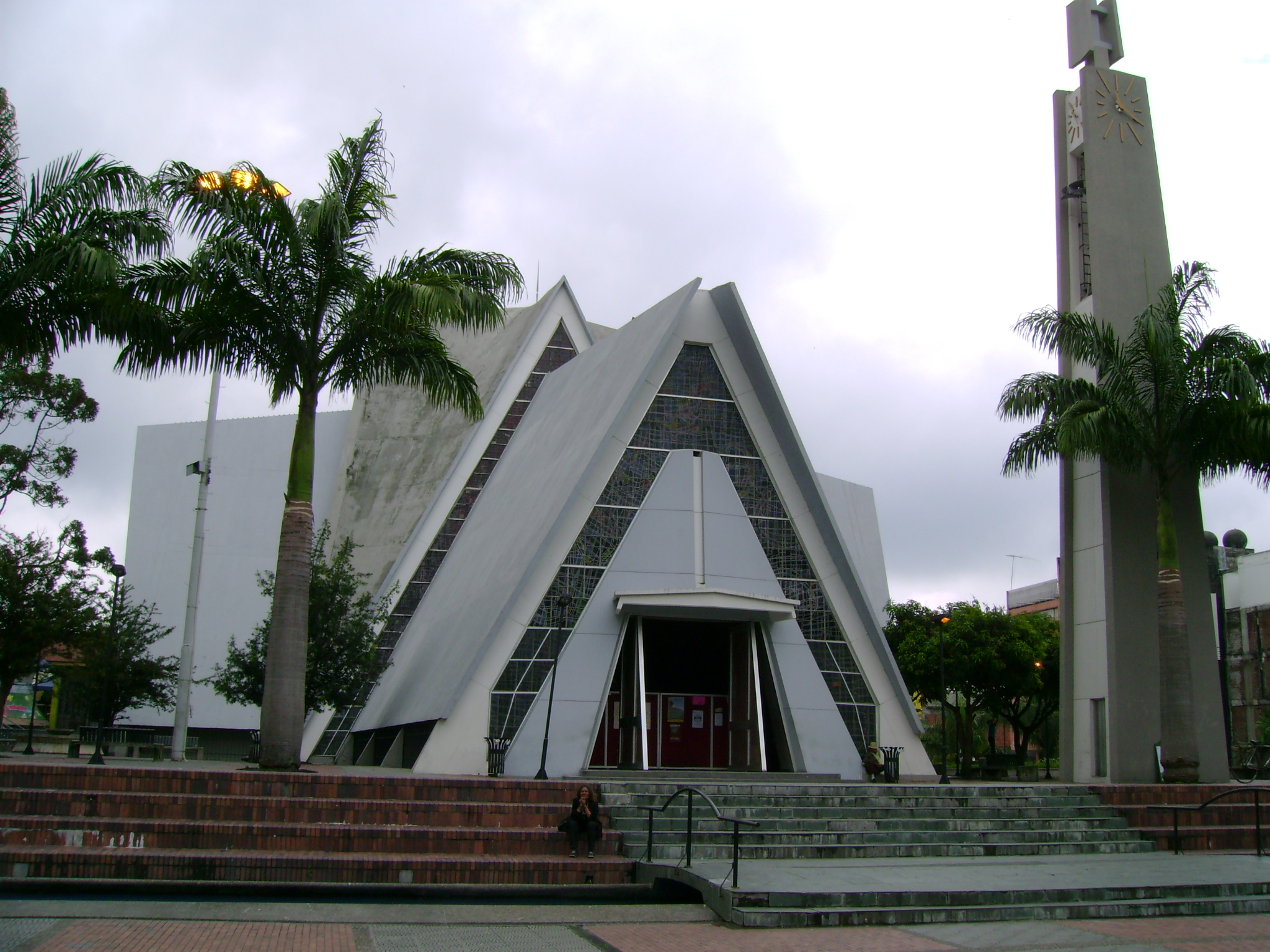
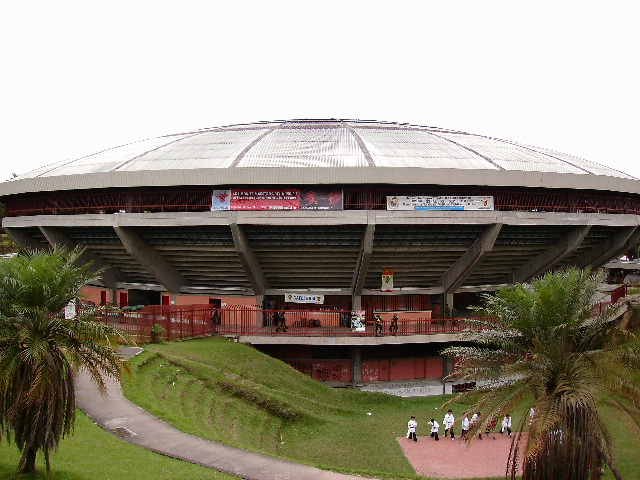
- From above and from left to right: Bolivar Square, Del Río High, North of the city, Cathedral, Coffee Colosseum

- Flag Coat of arms
- Nickname: Ciudad Milagro (Miracle City)
- Location of the city and municipality of Armenia in the Quindío Department

- Location in Colombia
- Coordinates: 4.53°N 75.68°W
- Country: Colombia
- Region: Andes Region
- Departamento: Quindío
- Founded: 1889

Government
  - Mayor: José Manuel Ríos Morales

Area
  - City: 140 km^{2} (54 sq mi)
- Elevation: 1,551 m (5,089 ft)

Population (2018)
  - City: 304,314
  - Density: 2,200/km^{2} (5,600/sq mi)
  - Urban: 296,259
  - Metro: 514,604
- Demonym(s): Cuyabro(a), Armenio(a)

GDP
  - Metro: COP 11,942 billion (US$ 2.8 billion)
- Time zone: UTC-05 (Eastern Time Zone)
- Area code: +57 (+6)
- Website: Government website (in Spanish)

Armenia (Spanish pronunciation: [aɾˈme.nja]) is the capital of Quindío Department in the South American country of Colombia. Armenia is a medium-sized city and part of the "coffee axis" along with Pereira and Manizales, making it one of the main centers of the national economy. As a result, the historic center of Armenia was named as part of the "Coffee Cultural Landscape" of UNESCO World Heritage Site in 2011.

== History ==
Jesús María Ocampo

The city was founded on October 14, 1889, by Jesús María Ocampo, also known as "Tigrero" (translates to "tiger killer") due to his love of hunting jaguars, known locally as tigers. Ocampo came from Anaime, Tolima, looking for shelter in the mountains of Quindío. He paid one hundred pesos in gold coins to Antonio Herrera for the land on which to build a fonda, or trade center, not only for himself but also for other colonists who came from Salento, Antioquia, Manizales, and areas surrounding the Quindío River and La Vieja River. Ocampo then proceeded to sell land for settlement. To encourage settlement, Ocampo returned to Anaime to ask for the help of his friend Juan de la Cruz Cardona and to marry thirteen-year-old Arsenia Cardona.

In August 1890, six months after its founding, Armenia reached a population of 100 people, allowing it to gain legal recognition by the government. In the founding meeting of the city, on October 14, 1889, the name of Villa Holguín was suggested, in honor of Carlos Holguín Mallarino, the then-current president of the country. However, the proposal was rejected, and the name Armenia was put to a vote and approved on November 30, 1889. Therefore, the belief that the name was changed to Armenia after the country of the same name, in memory of the Armenian people murdered by the Ottoman Turks in the Hamidian massacres of 1894–97 and later the Armenian genocide of 1915–23 is unsubstantiated, as the murders happened years after the town was already named, although some sources do dispute this. While other sources claim that it is most likely that the city was renamed after the historical Kingdom of Armenia, rumours persist of being named for Armenia or Armenians in memory of the Hamidian Massacres. It is more probable that colonists in those countries took to the Bible in some cases in naming their settlements.

Despite Armenia's quickly expanding economy at the time, the means of transport were still very limited. The main form of transporting people and merchandise was by mule, due to the mountainous terrain surrounding the city. It was not until the construction of the first asphalt road—in 1927 to Zarzal in the Department of Valle del Cauca—that transport was improved.

=== 1999 earthquake ===
On January 25, 1999, a 6.2 M_{L} earthquake occurred in Quindío. The epicenter was located 17 km south of Armenia. The earthquake was one of the most devastating events to have occurred in Colombia in recent history, with an estimated 1,900 casualties. The earthquake was also felt in Risaralda, Valle Del Cauca, Tolima, Antioquia, and Cundinamarca, but Armenia was the hardest-hit city. In just 15 years, the city was rebuilt, becoming one of the most visited tourist destinations in Colombia.

== Geography ==
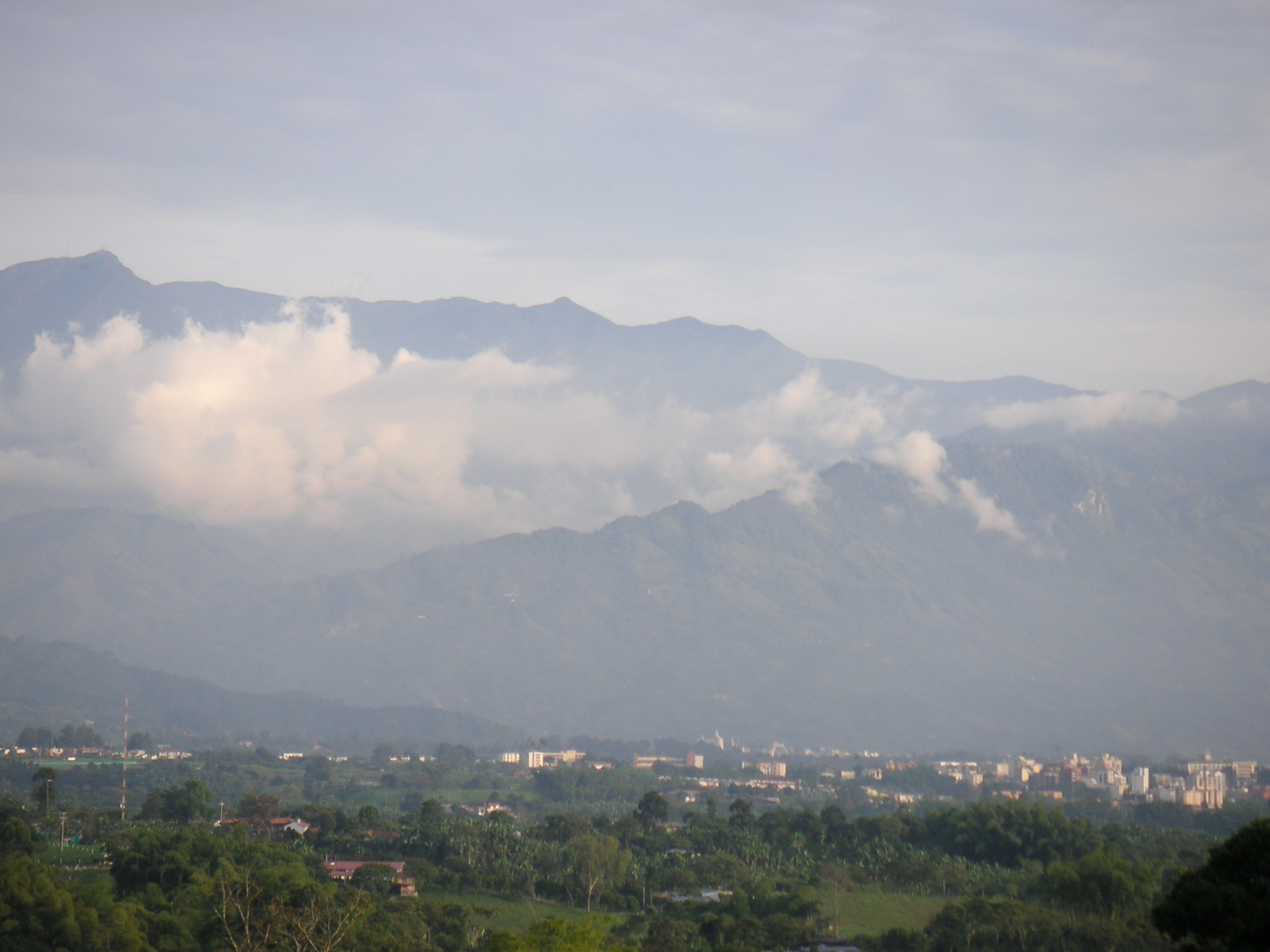
Landscape of Armenia and the Andes. Peñas Blancas can be seen in the background to the right.

The city of Armenia is located 290 kilometers west of Bogotá at a height of 1,483 m. Geographical coordinates are the following: 4.3270° north latitude 75.4120° west longitude. It has an area of 121 km^{2} (47 sq mi). It limits the north with the municipalities of Circasia and Salento, west to the town of Montenegro, east to the town of Calarcá and south with the municipality of La Tebaida. Armenia is situated close to the center of Cordillera about 35 km (22 mi) from the top of the line. The climate of the city of Armenia is varied, the average temperature ranges between 16–23 °C (61–73 °F).

=== Climate ===
Climate data for Calarcá/Armenia, elevation 1,450 m (4,760 ft), (1981–2010)
Month	Jan	Feb	Mar	Apr	May	Jun	Jul	Aug	Sep	Oct	Nov	Dec	Year
Mean daily maximum °C (°F)	25.6 (78.1)	25.9 (78.6)	26.1 (79.0)	25.1 (77.2)	25.0 (77.0)	25.3 (77.5)	25.9 (78.6)	26.3 (79.3)	25.6 (78.1)	24.6 (76.3)	24.7 (76.5)	25.1 (77.2)	25.4 (77.7)
Daily mean °C (°F)	20.6 (69.1)	20.9 (69.6)	20.9 (69.6)	20.7 (69.3)	20.6 (69.1)	20.9 (69.6)	21.1 (70.0)	21.2 (70.2)	20.4 (68.7)	19.9 (67.8)	19.9 (67.8)	20.2 (68.4)	20.6 (69.1)
Mean daily minimum °C (°F)	16.1 (61.0)	16.4 (61.5)	16.5 (61.7)	16.7 (62.1)	16.6 (61.9)	16.4 (61.5)	16.1 (61.0)	16.2 (61.2)	16.0 (60.8)	16.0 (60.8)	16.1 (61.0)	16.0 (60.8)	16.2 (61.2)
Average precipitation mm (inches)	166 (6.5)	137.8 (5.43)	229.9 (9.05)	253.0 (9.96)	203.9 (8.03)	85.0 (3.35)	67.6 (2.66)	86.5 (3.41)	140.8 (5.54)	253.7 (9.99)	313.1 (12.33)	222.3 (8.75)	2,159.5 (85.02)
Average relative humidity (%)	81	80	80	83	83	81	77	77	81	83	83	82	81
Mean monthly sunshine hours	130.2	115.7	133.3	99.0	108.5	126.0	145.7	148.8	120.0	99.2	108.0	130.2	1,464.6
Mean daily sunshine hours	4.2	4.1	4.3	3.3	3.5	4.2	4.7	4.8	4.0	3.2	3.6	4.2	4.0
Source: Instituto de Hidrologia Meteorologia y Estudios Ambientales

== Economy ==
Armenia is often referred to as "Ciudad Milagro" (Miracle City) due to its fast urban growth and development. The city center includes a nine block pedestrian walkway, lined by shops and restaurants, through the center of the city and connecting two of the city's plazas. The local economy main trade is still based on the production of coffee, plantains, and bananas. To the south of the city as it gets closer to sea level, the temperature favors not only Quindío's agricultural economy, but a renewed tourist industry in the shape of villas for rent, theme parks, eco-hotels and family day leisure centers, not excluding all-time favorites like local cuisine restaurants, exhibition centers and country clubs specializing in fishing, tennis, golf, cart racing and other sports. Many traditional plantations still exist in the surrounding area and many offer bed and breakfast accommodation and "ecotourism" packages. The city has a modern international airport El Edén International Airport with daily links to Bogotá, Cartagena de Indias, Medellín, Panama City and Fort Lauderdale, which make the city a convenient choice for conferences, meetings, business and social events.

== Transport ==
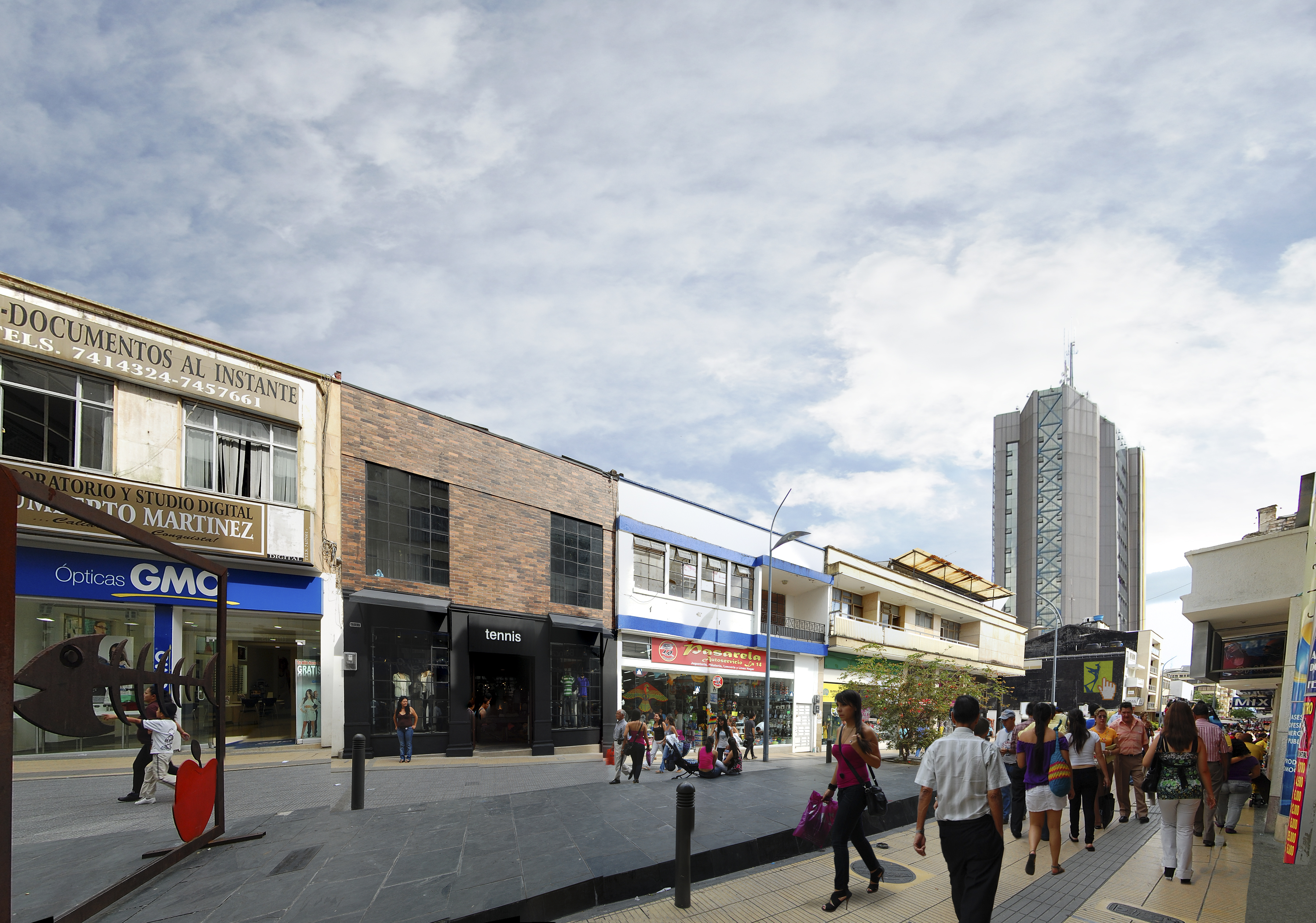
Outdoor mall Cielos Abiertos in Armenia

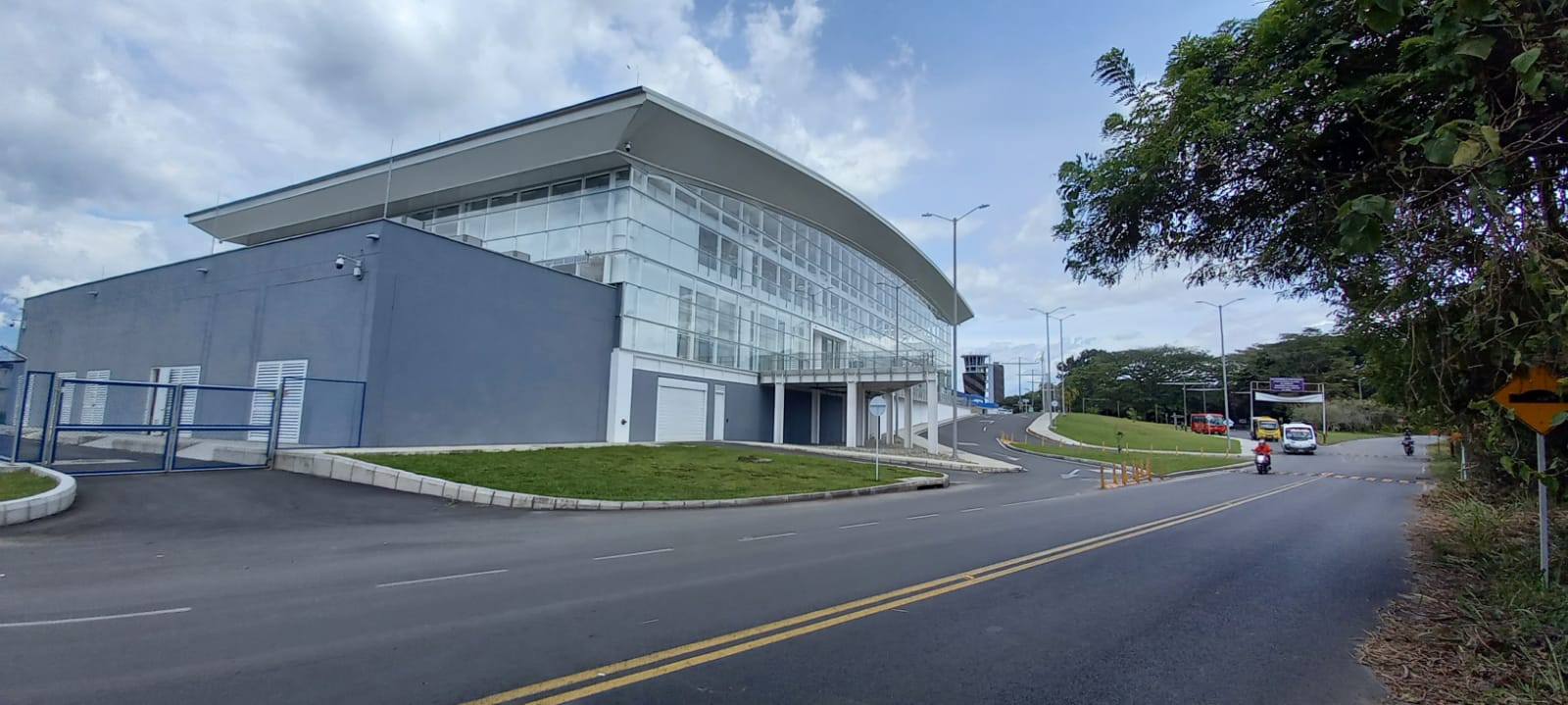
Airport El Edén

Armenia is part of the program "friendly cities" which seeks to improve the quality and service in urban transport in major urban centers of the country.

The city of Armenia implements its program called strategic public transport system, which is a program that advances the town hall by Friendly Company, an industrial and commercial entity been created to manage project resources.

The Strategic Public Transport System comes from the national strategy Gracious Cities National Development Plan which aims to improve the provision of public transport in intermediate cities of less than 400,000 inhabitants. It results from a national urban transport program established in 3167 CONPES of May 23, 2002, and responds to the need to establish a system that structures and allow better management of the city.

Thanks to the union of the three main utilities urban city (Armenia Buses, Urban Transport and Cooburquin City Miracle), new company was formed transport operator in the city, called TINTO (Transporte Integrado Operador de Armenia, in English: Integrated Transport Operator of Armenia), showing its citizens a new image, coffee, icon of the city and the department.

Part of this information is taken from Armenia Friendly program, the website of the Strategic Public Transport System of Armenia.

El Edén International Airport is approximately 10 kilometres (6.2 mi) from the city, on the road to the municipality La Tebaida.

== Tourism and folklore ==
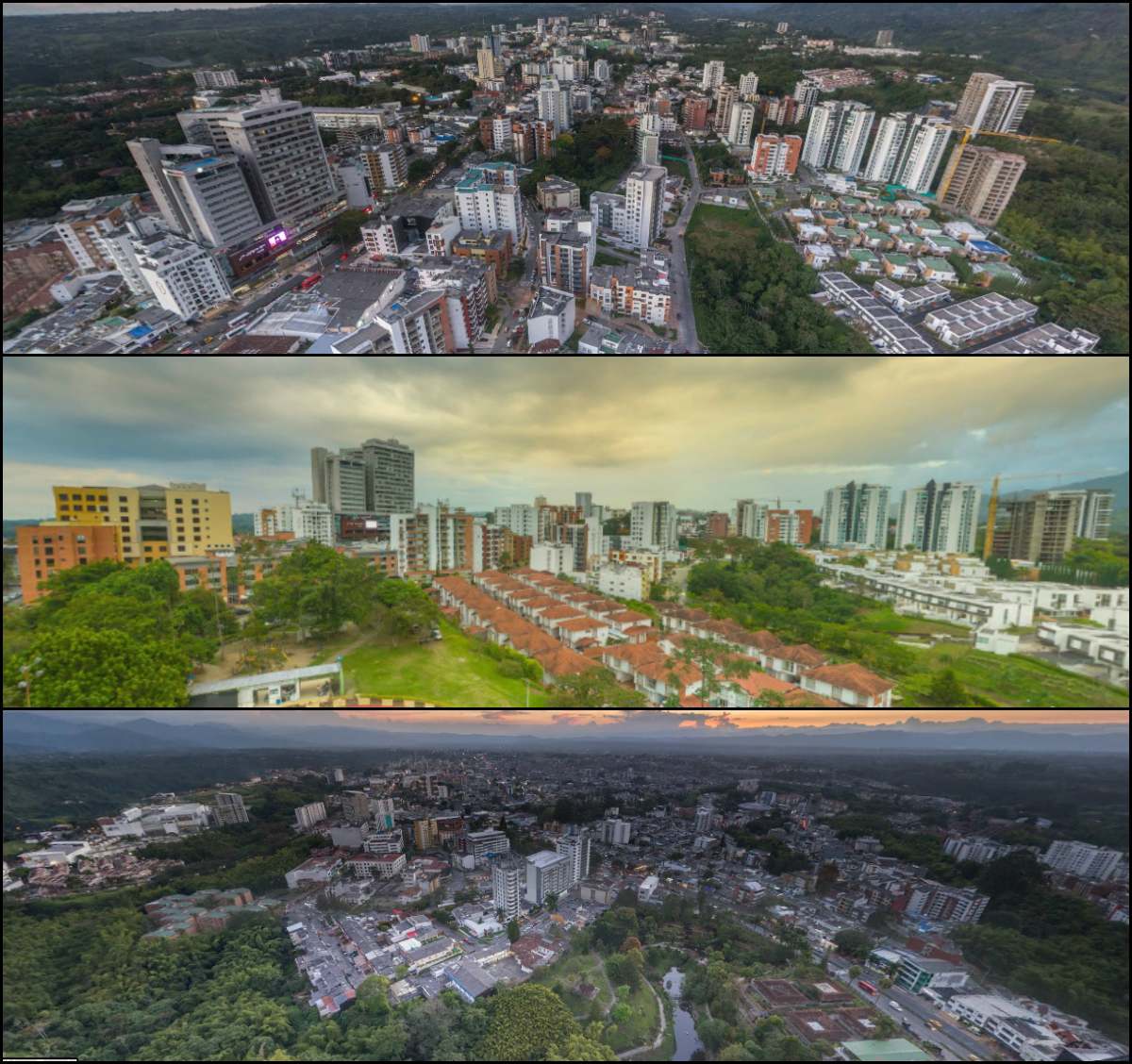
Armenia skyline

The renewed tourist industry has activated the popularity of the city and its surrounding areas. The region's northern area is the gateway to Los Nevados national park, where the highest peaks in central Colombia rise to perpetual snows at more than 4,500 metres. At the Quindío side of the foothills of this national park, lies the Cocora Valley, where the National Tree of Colombia, the wax palm grows, and whose municipality of Salento is a tourist destination known for its culinary delicacy (fried river trout), for its guadua crafts and furniture (the strong native bamboo cane), its art galleries and its position as a bohemian centre of regional artists. Tourists and hikers walk from here to reach the views of the park.

The county's folklore is represented throughout events and traditions visible during most of its towns festivities to name a few:

The Yipao (Parade of Jeeps): After World War II Armenia was given imported general purpose Jeeps vehicles so that they may be used for the difficult paths. However, these old vehicles have been also adopted into a traditional parade carrying oversized loads of coffee, local agriculture products and people.

The Chapoleras beauty pageant, with costumes depicting the traditional coffee harvesting dress in the fashion of the late 19th century, and the various dances, is known in the entire country.

Each fall, La Asociacion Quindiana de Orquideologia hosts an orchid show, open to the public. This includes local judging by Colombian judges and often international judging by the American Orchid Society.

== Art and handcrafts ==
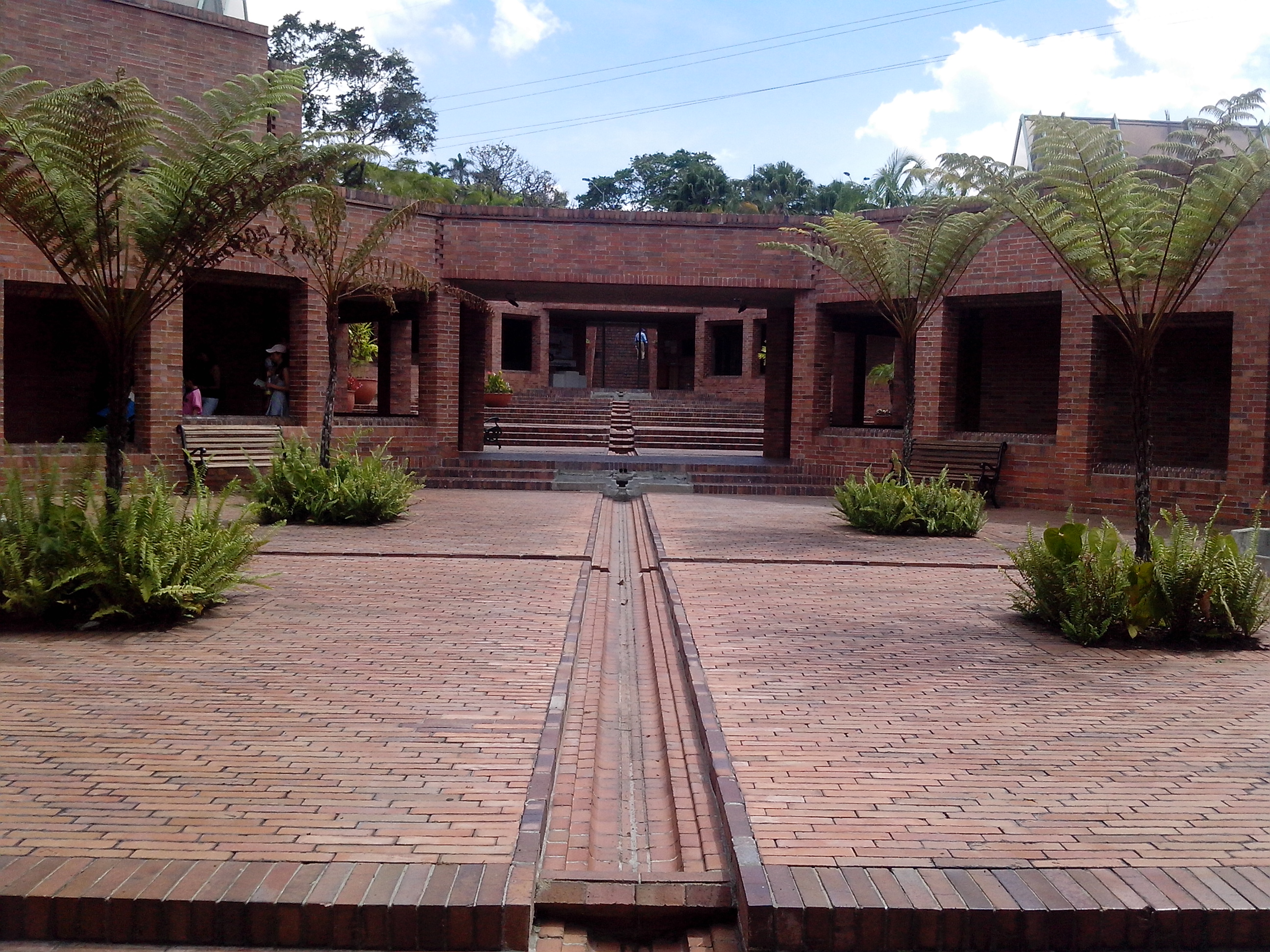
Quimbaya Museum

This region was widely known in the country in the early 20th century for the production of storage receptacles made of the empty dried shell of the fruit of a local species of inedible bottle gourd, the "Cuyabra" or "totumo", which gives the demonym of "cuyabros" to the people born in this city. Nowadays, they are no longer mass-produced for practical purposes as cheaper materials such as plastics displaced them from the market, but these traditional receptacles are still produced and hand-painted.

The Carriel is a traditional handbag leather handcraft symbolic of the paisa culture and the early antioquian colonisation. It is often used in the typical dances and parades, and its miniature version is sold to tourists as souvenir. The cabuya handicrafts are often seen.

The bamboo guadua is widely used in creation of art crafts, furniture and buildings.

== Education and sports ==
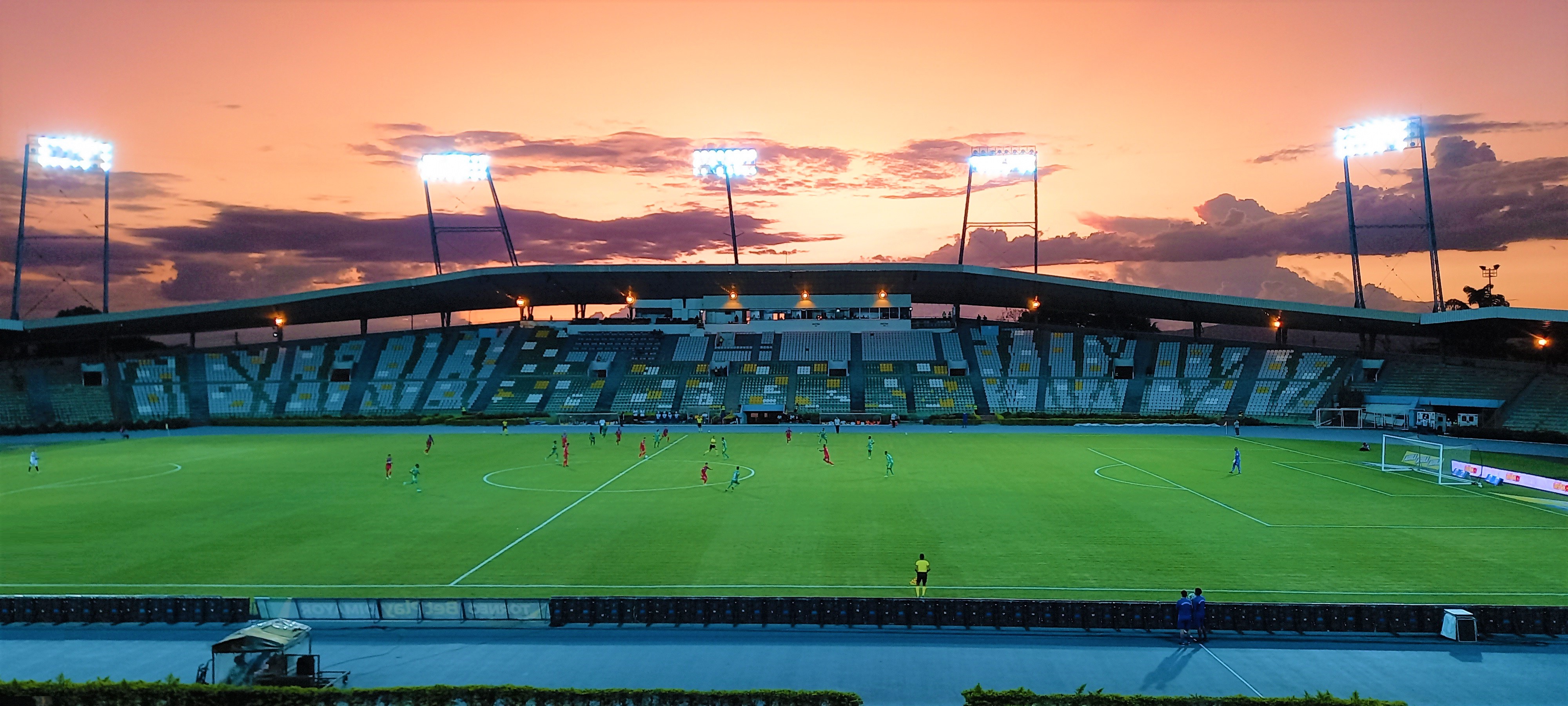
Centenario Stadium.

The main sports centre in the city is the Centenario Stadium, and the Coliseo del cafe (Armenia, Colombia). Where local sporting events can be seen, including national and international football tournaments and the local professional football club Deportes Quindío. Other sport events are golf, swimming, and cycling. The highly varied geography surrounding Armenia has helped create some of the greatest climbing cyclists in the world, many of whom compete internationally in events such as the Tour de France.

The local university in the city is the University of Quindío. Its campus is spotted in the north of the city, and it is the most important educational and research entity in the place and in the whole department.

The Quimbaya museum designed by Rogelio Salmona, offers a permanent display of pre-Columbian handcrafts, ceramic, and gold artpieces.

== Media ==
- Newspaper: La Crónica del Quindío
- Television: Telecafé

== Sister cities ==
Colombia:

- Calarcá, Quindío
- Pereira, Risaralda
- Manizales, Caldas
