= Carlos Ardila Lülle =

Colombian entrepreneur (1930–2021)

- Born: June 4, 1930; Bucaramanga, Colombia
- Died: August 13, 2021 (aged 91); Cali, Colombia
- Citizenship: Colombian, Spanish
- Education: National University of Colombia
- Occupation: Businessman
- Known for: Postobon soft drink

Carlos Ardila Lülle (Spanish pronunciation: [ˈkaɾlos aɾˈðila ˈlule]; June 4, 1930 – August 13, 2021) was a Colombian entrepreneur and the founder and head of the Organización Ardila Lülle, a major Colombian conglomerate which controls companies such as RCN TV, the Postobon soft drink, and the Atlético Nacional football team. His estate's net worth is estimated at over $1.8 billion U.S. dollars.

== Biography ==
Carlos Ardila Lülle was born in the city of Bucaramanga, Colombia on July 4, 1930. At fifteen he completed secondary education at the Jesuit run Colegio San Pedro Claver, and moved to Medellín to study civil engineering at the School of Mines at the National University of Colombia, graduating in 1951. He then began work in the soft drink business as a Plant Manager for Gaseosas LUX, entrusted with production and expansion in the city of Cali. While working there he met his wife, Maria Eugenia Gaviria, a daughter of one of the owners of the company, Antonio Gaviria. With her he had two children, Carlos Julio and Antonio Jose. He also has two daughters, Maria Emma and Maria Eugenia.

At Gaseosas LUX, he worked on the development and promotion of new flavors, and in 1954 saw great success in the development of a new soft drink flavored with apples. One of the first in the world with that flavor, it is now marketed as their flagship product, Postobon. Ardila later said he feels a special affection for this achievement as a contribution to the beverage industry. The commercial success with Gaseosas LUX allowed them to gradually acquire shares in the company Postobón, S.A., which made a popular drink, Kola Champaña. After uniting the two companies, Ardila then became president of Postobón, S.A. in 1968.

At this stage he initiated the acquisition of other Colombian soft drink companies over the final decades of the twentieth century, bringing these similar companies under the same management at Postobón. After his commercial success with non-alcoholic beverage companies, he began investing in companies directly related to the raw materials of soda, such as the sugar industry, marking the beginning of his Organización Ardila Lülle (OAL). Ardila next moved into textiles and media, and in 1972 acquired the nationwide radio company Radio Cadena Nacional (RCN). He acquired the record company Sonolux in 1973, and in 1978, he added a television channel under the RCN platform called RCN TV. This would develop into a prominent premium channel in 1998, and branch off in 2008 with a news channel called Nuestra Tele Noticias 24 Horas (NTN24).

In 1978, he also acquired textile company Coltejer, which has remained a leader in the textile sector in Antioquia. Majority control of Coltejer was later sold to Mexican business group Kaltex South America S.A. in 2008. In 1994, he founded Leona Brewery, and in 1996 he bought the main Colombia soccer team, Atlético Nacional, making Leona Beer their main sponsor until he later sold the brewery to Bavaria. In 1998, devaluation of the Colombian Peso caused him to lose 38% of his net worth internationally.

Ardila was distinguished in Colombia by the National Government with the Grand Cross award Order of Boyaca, for services to the Colombian military, and the Order of Democracy of Simón Bolívar. He was chosen as "The Entrepreneur of the Twentieth Century" by a group of eleven business school deans in Colombia, and received commendations from King of Spain Juan Carlos I including honorary Spanish citizenship. He was listed as one of the richest men in Latin America, and appeared on several occasions in Forbes magazine, with his capital assets estimated at over 1 billion dollars. On August 13, 2021 he died from natural causes in the city of Cali, Colombia.

== Organización Ardila Lülle ==
Today, Organización Ardila Lülle is industrially one of the most important conglomerates in Colombia along with Alejandro Santo Domingo's Grupo Empresarial Bavaria S.A., and Luis Carlos Sarmiento Angulo's Grupo Aval Acciones y Valores. After positioning his company in the beverage sector, Carlos Ardila Lülle founded and consolidated the Organización Ardila Lülle, today comprising over 80 companies generating more than 40,000 jobs in Colombia, producing goods and services in sectors as diverse as communications, beverages, textiles, and entertainment.

=== Beverages ===
- Postobon

=== Packaging ===
- Peldar
- Iberplast
- Crown Colombiana

=== Media ===
- RCN TV
- RCN Radio
- RCN Entertainment
- RCN Nuestra Tele Internacional
- Nuestra Tele Noticias 24 Horas

=== Agroindustrials ===
- Central Incauca
- Central Providencia
- Central Risaralda
- Sociedad Agropecuaria Bananal S.A.
- Industrias Forestales Doña María S.A.
- Sucromiles S.A.
- Sociedad Comercializadora Int. de Azúcares y Mieles S.A.

=== Textiles ===
- Textiles Rionegro C.A.
- Coltejer S.A.

=== Automotive sector ===
- Los Coches S.A., Volkswagen dealers in Colombia

=== Sports teams ===
- Atlético Nacional
