= Postobón =

Colombian beverage company

Postobón, S.A.
- Type: Subsidiary
- Industry: Beverage
- Founded: 1904
- Founder: Gabriel Posada and Valerio Tobón
- Headquarters: Medellín, Colombia
- Key people: Hector Fernando Garcia
- Owner: Grupo Mariposa
- Parent: Grupo Mariposa
- Website: www.postobon.com

Postobón, S.A. (Spanish pronunciation: [postoˈβon] ) is the largest Colombian beverage company, and also one of the largest in South America. The company has a wide portfolio of products that includes soft drinks, fruit juices, bottled water, tea, an energy drink, and coffee.

It has created soft drinks such as "Manzana Postobón", an apple-flavored soda, and its most popular "Colombiana", a cola champagne. Additional flavors of Postobón soda beyond apple include grape, orange, pineapple, and lemon.

Postobón has expanded its product line by including bottled water and boxed juices; the latter are currently sold under the brandname Hit.

== History ==
On October 11, 1904, Gabriel Posada and Valerio Tobón (the company's name being a portmanteau of their last names) started to produce soft drinks. Soon after, in Medellín, Colombia, their first product, called "Cola-Champaña", became popular in bars, stores, social clubs, and homes. This product was distributed in a wagon pulled by a donkey; because of geography the company could not distribute its products throughout all cities and towns. At this stage, Posada and Tobón decided to open two factories; the first was opened in 1906 in Manizales and the second in Cali the same year. Since that time, Postobón products have appeared throughout Colombia.

In 1917, the company launched a new product, "Agua Cristal" which is bottled water. In 1918, Postobón released a brand of carbonated water, "Bretaña."

In 1986 Postobón started sponsorship of the Postóbon team, a professional Colombian cycling team. This was following the successes of the first Colombian professional cycling team - Café de Colombia. In 1986 the team competed in the Tour de France. The team lasted for ten years. Since 1998 to this date, Postobón sponsors football club Atlético Nacional (replacing Leona beer).

Since 2010, Postobón has been the official sponsor of all the Colombian soccer leagues.

In June of 2025, the company was sanctioned by Colombia's Superintendent of Industry and Commerce for mislabeling products with inaccurate product volume.

In July 2025, Postobón disclosed they were in talks with other beverage partners to discuss alliances. The company reassured its customers that a sale was not imminent and that Postobón remains committed to the Colombian market.
