= El Colombiano =

Colombian daily newspaper

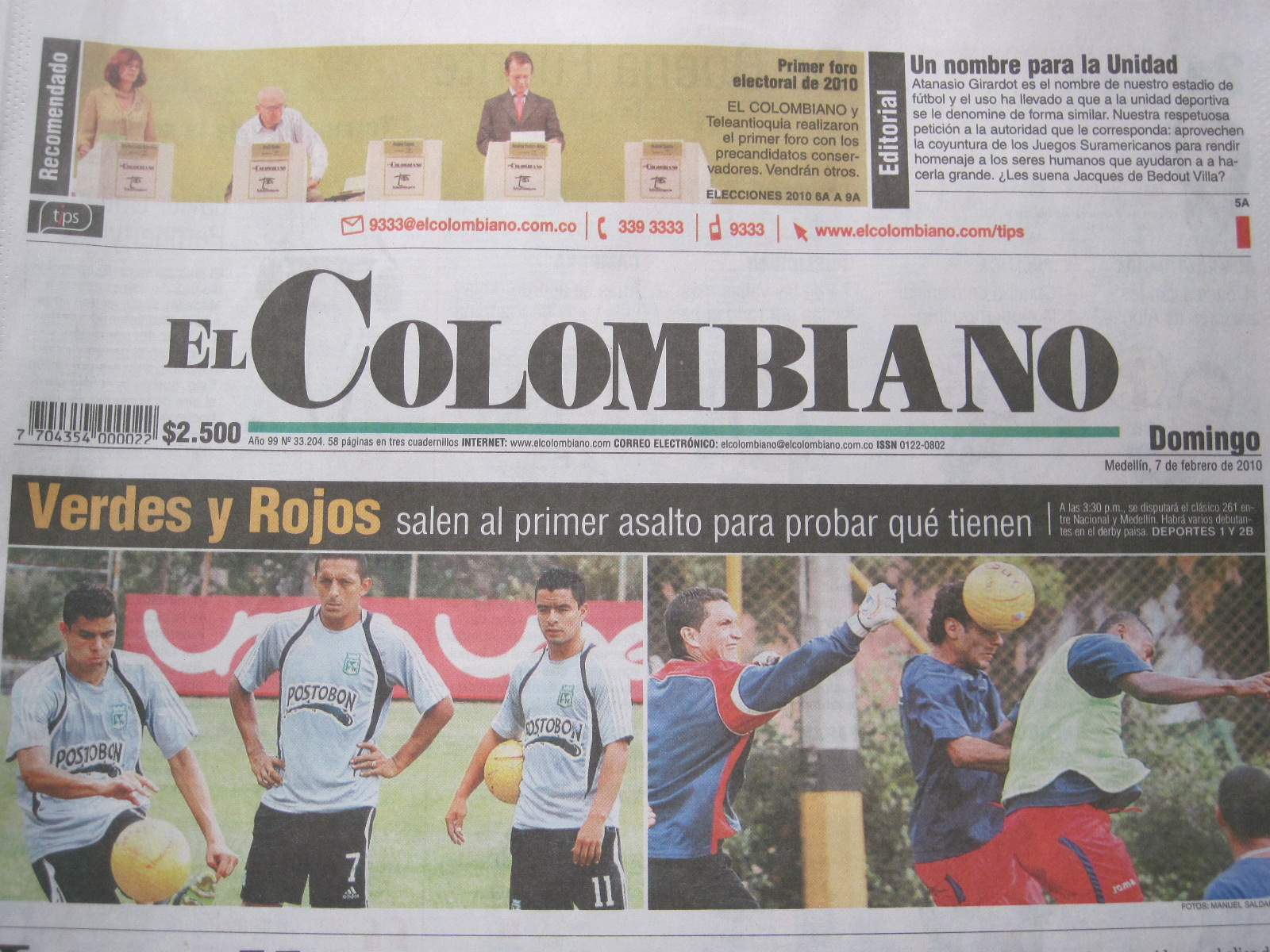
- El Colombiano front page, 7 February 2010 issue
- Type: Daily newspaper
- Format: Tabloid (Since 2012)
- Founder: Francisco de Paula Pérez Tamayo
- Publisher: Luz María Sierra
- Editor-in-chief: Daniel Rivera Marín
- Founded: February 6, 1912; 114 years ago
- Language: Spanish
- Headquarters: Carrera 48 # 30 Sur - 119, Envigado, Antioquia
- Price: 1900 COP (monday to saturday); 3300 COP (Sunday)
- ISSN: 0122-0802
- Website: www.elcolombiano.com (in Spanish)

El Colombiano (lit. 'The Colombian') is a daily newspaper and the most read in Antioquia Department in Colombia whose headquarters are located in Medellín.

The first edition of this newspaper was published on February 6, 1912, which only had one page, 13 advertisements, but no news articles. In 1976, the first color pictures were added and in 1980, the content of this newspaper changed from 8 to 6 columns. On February 16, 2001, it was released with its current layout.

El Colombiano is part of Periódicos Asociados Latinoamericanos (Latin American Newspaper Association), an organization of fourteen leading newspapers in South America.

== See also ==
- El Mundo
