= List of birdwatchers =

This is a list of notable birdwatchers and of people who are notable in their own right but also happen to be birdwatchers.

First are listed birdwatchers with large life lists, which is based on the number of species of birds each of them has/had seen. Depending on the taxonomic viewpoint, there are 10,858 (Clements V2023) or 11,032 (IOC ver. 14.1) living bird species recognised.

== Large life lists ==
As of January 5th 2026 according to the iGoTerra website, there is only one birder who has added 10,000 or more species of birds to their life lists. An additional 18 birders have added at least 9,000 species of life birds and 34 at least 8,000 species. Note: all known sources of bird species life list data are self-reported.

Birders with over 8,000 species include:

- Peter Kaestner: 10,002 / 10,009 / 9,851 (#1 on Surfbirds / #1 on iGoTerra / #1 on eBird). Discovered the Cundinamarca antpitta (Grallaria kaestneri), which was subsequently named after him. First birder to see a representative of each of the world's (currently 249 [2021 eBird/Clements list] or 253 [2024 IOC list]) bird families.
- Philip Rostron: 9,763 (#2 on Surfbirds)
- Claes-Göran Cederlund: 9,761/ 9,829 (#3 on Surfbirds, #4 on iGoTerra). Deceased 2020)
- Sue Williamson: 9,306 (#14 on Surfbirds—#1 female birder)
- Phoebe Snetsinger: 8,398 (deceased 1999). First person to see 8,000 species. At time of her death in Madagascar she was World #1.
- Bernard Master: 8,346 The Chocó vireo (Vireo masteri) is named after him.

== Other notable birdwatchers ==
- Salim Ali: Indian ornithologist and naturalist, known as the "Birdman of India."
- Ramana Athreya: birdwatcher and astronomer
- Jacob Bates Abbott: wildlife painter, illustrator, conservationist
- John James Audubon, ornithologist and painter
- Mindy Baha El Din: ornithologist and environmentalist
- Florence Merriam Bailey: ornithologist and author of several early field guides
- Jim Clements: author of The Clements Checklist of the Birds of the World; 7,200 (deceased in 2005)
- Christian Cooper: host of National Geographic's Extraordinary Birder
- Dominic Couzens: ornithologist and author
- Pete Dunne: American birder, and author of over a dozen books on birding and natural history
- Arjan Dwarshuis: >6,852 World record holder for most bird species observed in 1 year. He recorded 6,852 species in his record breaking big year in 2016, over 6 continents and 40 countries
- Lee G R Evans: British twitcher and ornithologist
- Kenn Kaufman: American field guide author and writer
- G. Stuart Keith: Co-founder, American Birding Association; a life list of 6,500
- Richard Koeppel: subject of To See Every Bird on Earth; a life list of over 7,000
- J. Drew Lanham: American author, poet, and wildlife biologist
- Starr Saphir: led bird walks in New York City's Central Park for nearly four decades
- David Allen Sibley: American artist and field guide author

== Birdwatchers famous for achievements in other fields ==
- Jane Alexander, American-Canadian actress and author, former board director for the National Audubon Society, former board member of BirdLife International
- Margaret Atwood, Canadian poet, novelist, literary critic, essayist, and environmental activist
- Sean Bean, English actor of stage and screen
- Stephen Breyer, United States Supreme Court Justice
- Brian Briggs, singer-songwriter with Stornoway and The Glass Aisle
- Laura Bush, former First Lady of the United States
- Jarvis Cocker, English musician and frontman for the band Pulp
- George Crook, 19th century U.S. Army General
- Keith Flint, English singer and vocalist of the Prodigy
- Anna Ford, journalist and television presenter
- Jonathan Franzen, American novelist and essayist
- Graeme Gibson, Canadian novelist
- Trudie Goodwin, English actress
- Daryl Hannah, American actress
- Mick Jagger, English musician, singer-songwriter and actor, best known as lead vocalist and founding member of the Rolling Stones
- Joanna Lumley, English actress, voice-over artist, former-model and author
- Paul McCartney, English musician, best known as member of the Beatles
- Rory McGrath, British comedian and writer
- Eric Morecambe, English comedian
- Tig Notaro, American stand-up comic and actor
- Bill Oddie, actor, author, comedian, television presenter
- Vic Reeves, English comedian
- Debby Reynolds, British veterinary surgeon
- Theodore Roosevelt, President of the United States
- Alison Steadman, English actress
- Amy Tan, American author
- Lili Taylor, American actress, American Birding Association board member
- Laura Wade, British playwright
- Samuel West, British actor and director

== See also ==
- List of ornithologists
