= National symbols of Colombia =

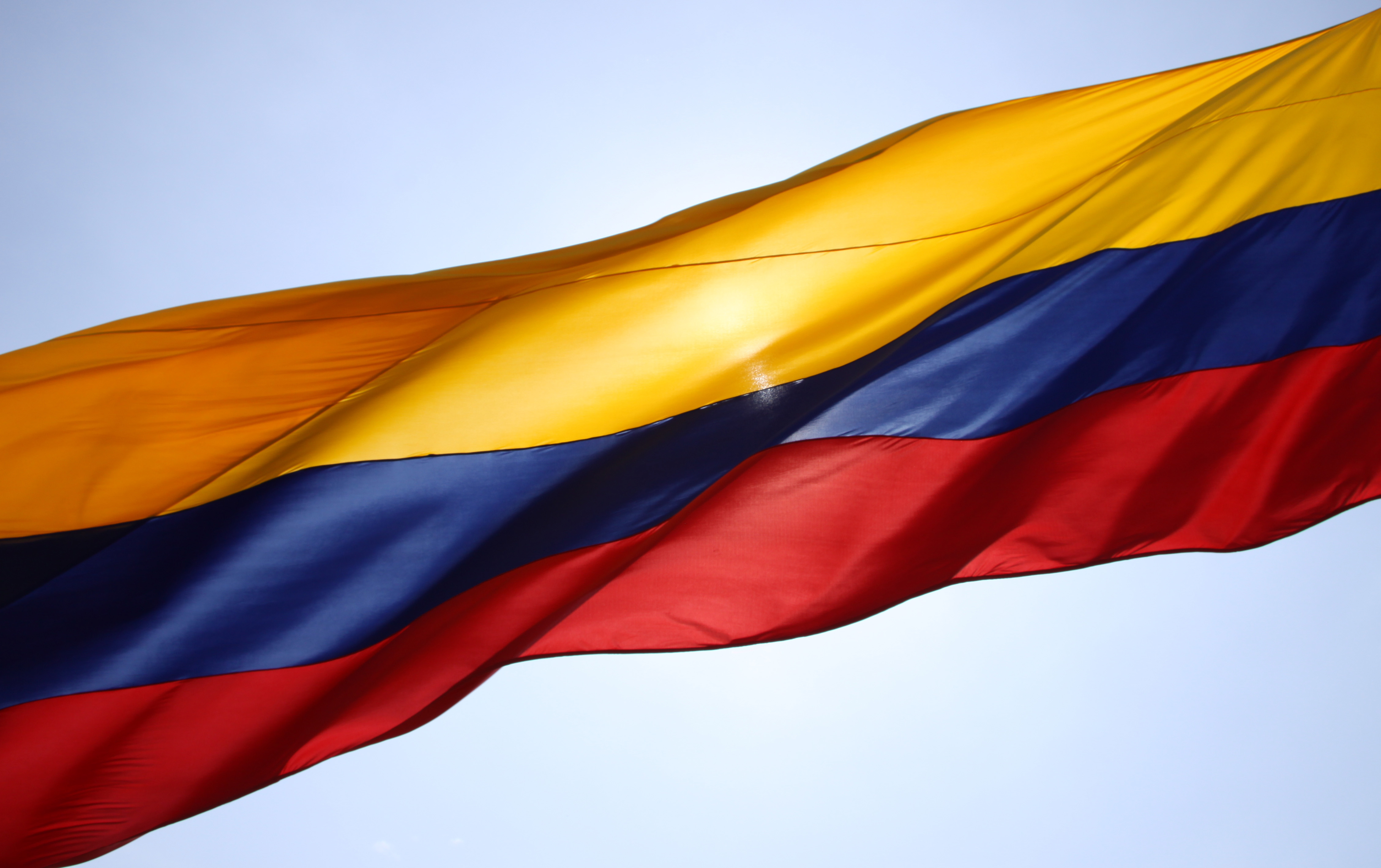
The flag of Colombia in Cartagena, Colombia.

The National symbols of Colombia are the symbols which represent the national identity of the Republic of Colombia as a sovereign state. The national symbols intend to represent the Colombian identity by creating visual, verbal cultural iconic representations of the national people, values, goals, and history.

These symbols are often rallied around as part of celebrations of patriotism and are designed to be inclusive and representative of all the peoples of the national community.

== National flag ==
Flag of Colombia.

The Colombian flag was defined in 1934 by the Decrees 861 of 1934, expedited by the Government of Colombia during the presidencies of General Pedro Nel Ospina and Enrique Olaya Herrera.

As defined in the Constitution of Colombia Decree number 861 of May 17, 2014 in Article 1, the pavilion, flag and standard of the Republic of Colombia is composed by the yellow, blue and red colors distributed in three horizontal stripes. The yellow top stripe is positioned in the upper area of the flag and has a width of half of the entire flag horizontally. The other two stripes the middle blue and the bottom red will each be a fourth of the total area of the flag. The yellow color represents Colombia's gold and natural wealthiness; the blue color represents the two oceans that border Colombia, the Pacific and Atlantic oceans, rivers and the sky; The red color represents the blood of the patriots that fought against the Spanish monarchy to gain the independence of Colombia. Authorized variations of the Colombian flag also represent the merchant flag of Colombia, the War flag of Colombia exclusively used by the Colombian Army. The flag with the Colombian coat of arms is of exclusive use of the armed institutions of Colombia.

== Coat of arms ==
Coat of arms of Colombia

The coat of arms of Colombia is divided into three horizontal stripes: the upper band, on a blue field, has in the center a golden pomegranate red open grained, with stem and leaves of gold. On each side of the pomegranate is a cornucopia of gold inclined, pouring coins into the center of the right side, and proper fruits of the torrid zone the left side. The grenade denotes the name he bore this republic, and cornucopias, its rich mines and the fertility of their land. All environmental, platinum field, has in its center a Phrygian cap horned into a spear, a symbol of freedom, (Platinum, precious metal, typical of our country). At the lower end is the Isthmus of Panama was part of Colombia in the past, with its two adjacent seas wavy silver, and a black ship, under sail in each. This El condor symbolizing freedom. From its peak hangs a green laurel wreath and flowing ribbon, grabbed the shield and woven into the crown, is read on gold with black letters: Freedom and Order. Four horns arising inclined shield (two on the right and two to the left) hang four national flags surrounding Flags are linked at the bottom.

=== Four flags ===
The shield is posing over four flags of Colombia diverging from the base in which the two upper ones form an angle of 90° and separated from the bottom ones 15°. These flags are posted towards the coat of arms' vertex.

== National tree ==
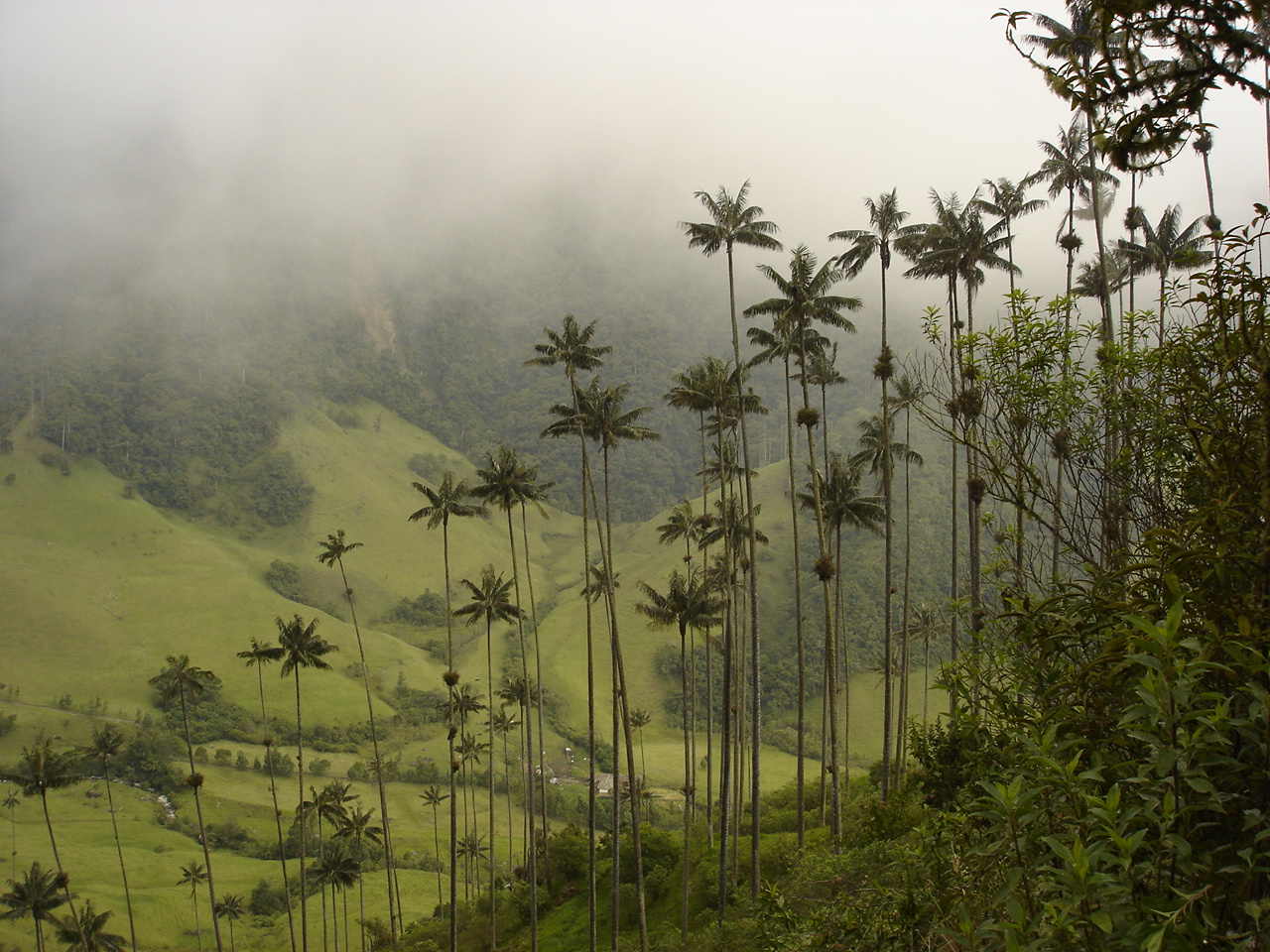
Panoramic of Cocora valley with wax palms

The wax palm tree, Ceroxylon quindiuense, also known as the Quindío wax, is Colombia's national tree. The palm is native to the Andean high altitude Cocora valley in the department of Quindío, northwest Colombia, and is the tallest palm tree in the world.

== National flower ==
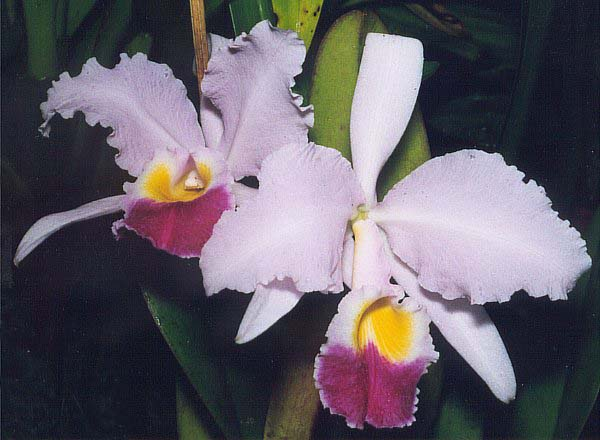
Cattleya trianae is the national flower of Colombia.

The national flower of Colombia is the orchid Cattleya trianae, which was named after the Colombian naturalist José Jerónimo Triana. The orchid was selected by botanist Emilio Robledo, in representation of the Colombian Academy of History to determine the most representative flowering plant of Colombia. He described it as one of the most beautiful flowers in the world and selected Cattleya trianae as National symbol.

== Other national symbols ==
- National bird: Andean condor
- National horse breed: Paso Fino
- National sport: Tejo

== Items related to the national identity ==
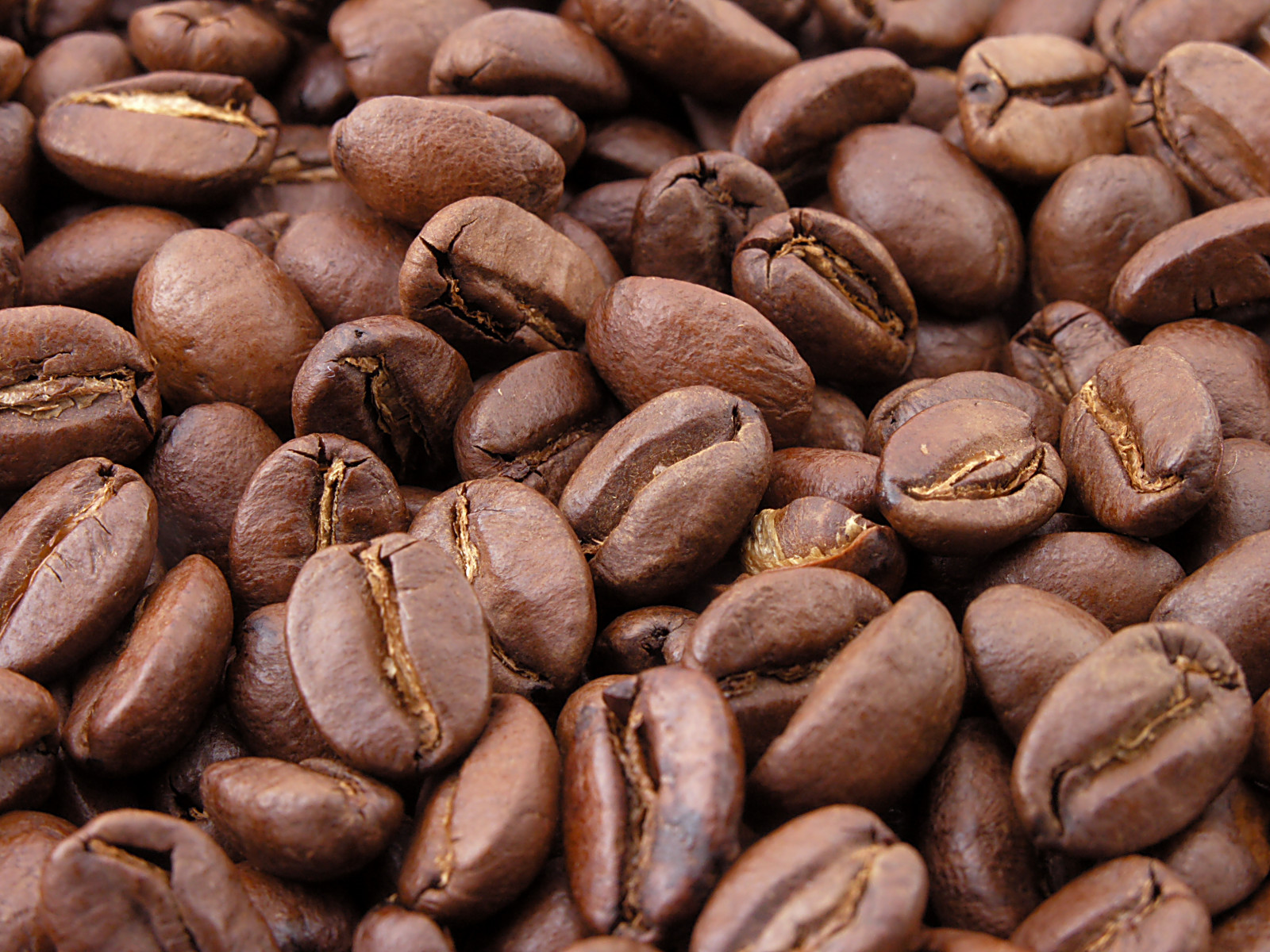
Colombian coffee has a Protected Designation of Origin

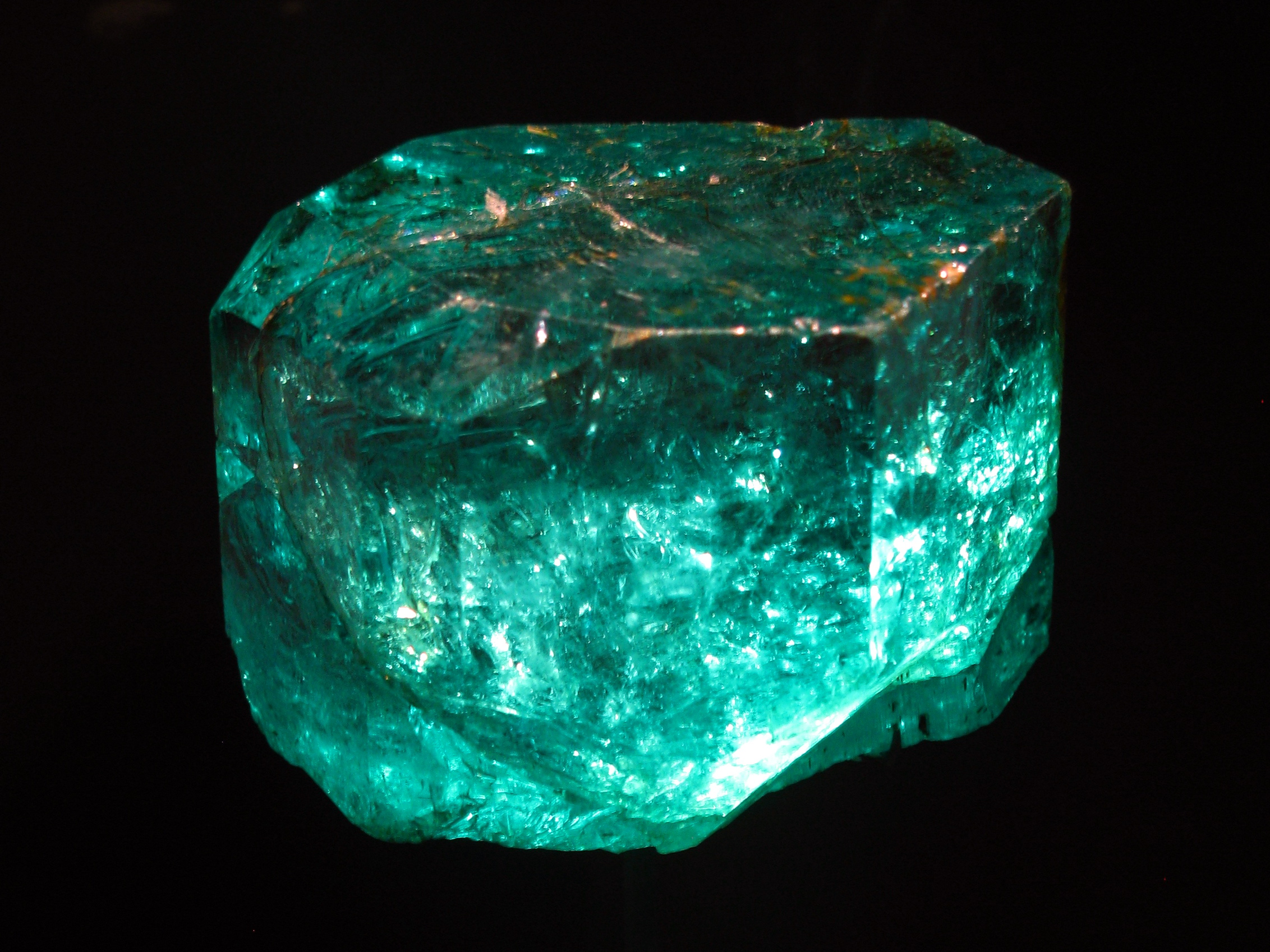
Gachalá Emerald. Colombian emeralds have the highest quality worldwide

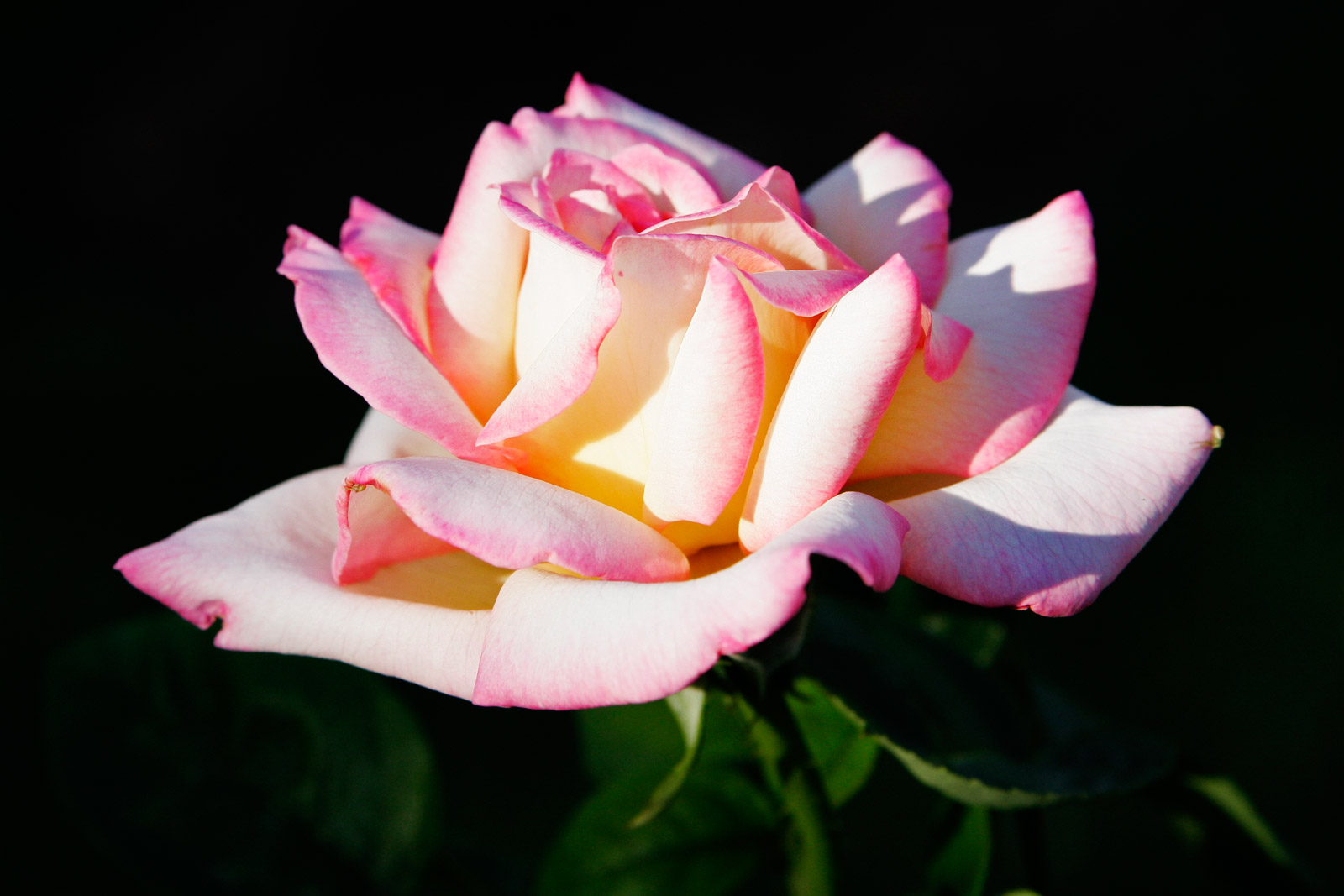
Colombia is the main producer and exporter of roses worldwide

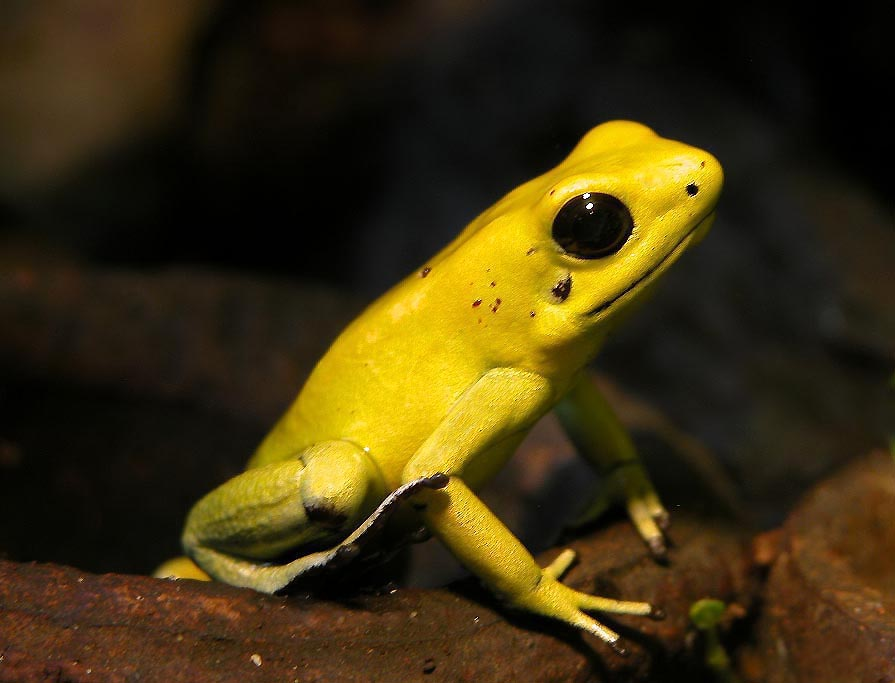
Colombia has the highest diversity of amphibian species in the world. Photo: the most poisonous vertebrate ever, Phyllobates terribilis
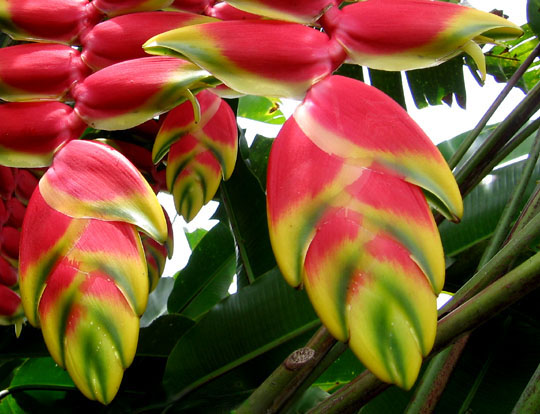
Colombia has the largest amount of Heliconia species worldwide

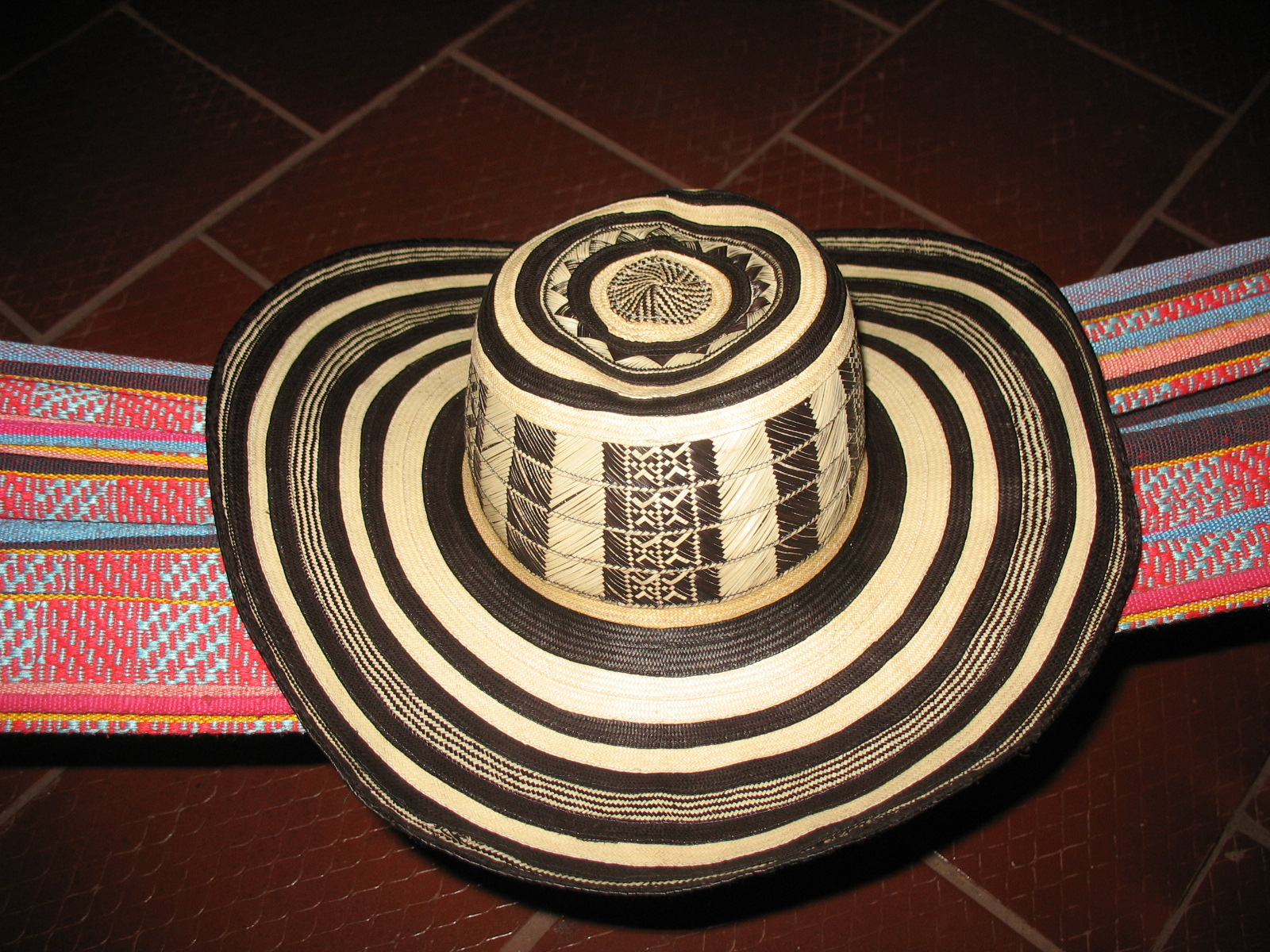
Sombrero vueltiao

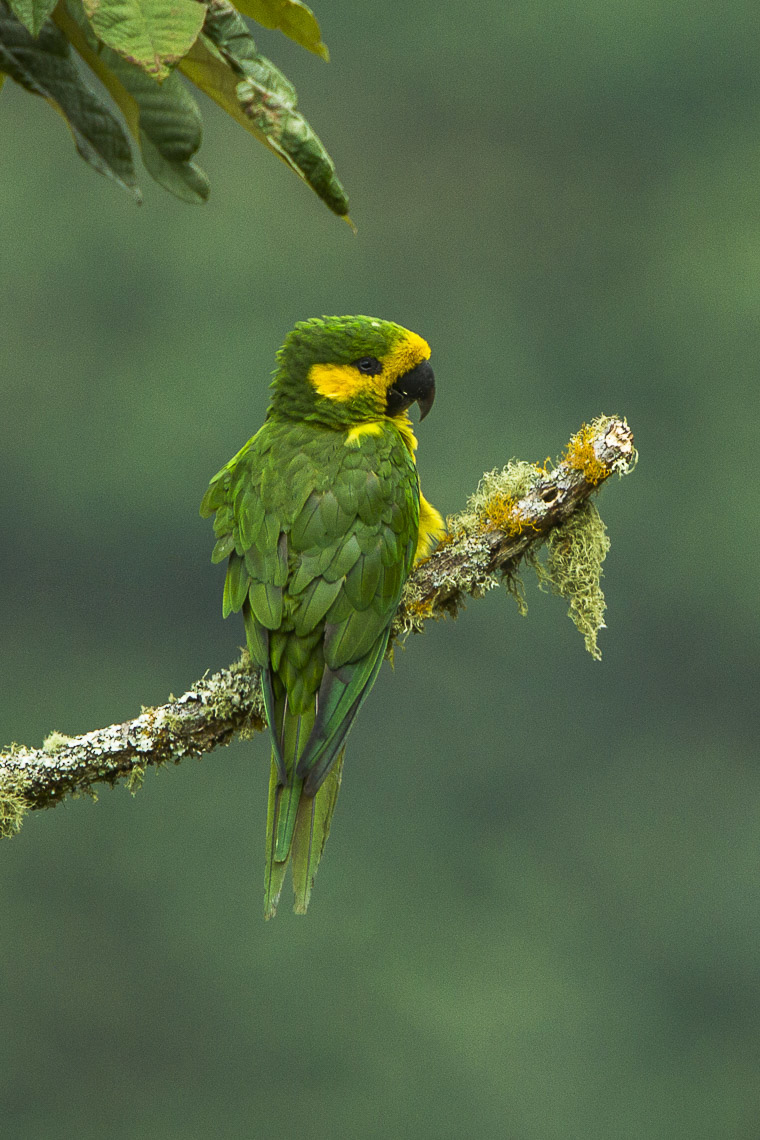
Colombia has the highest endemism in the world, with 10% of all described species. Photo: Yellow-eared parrot

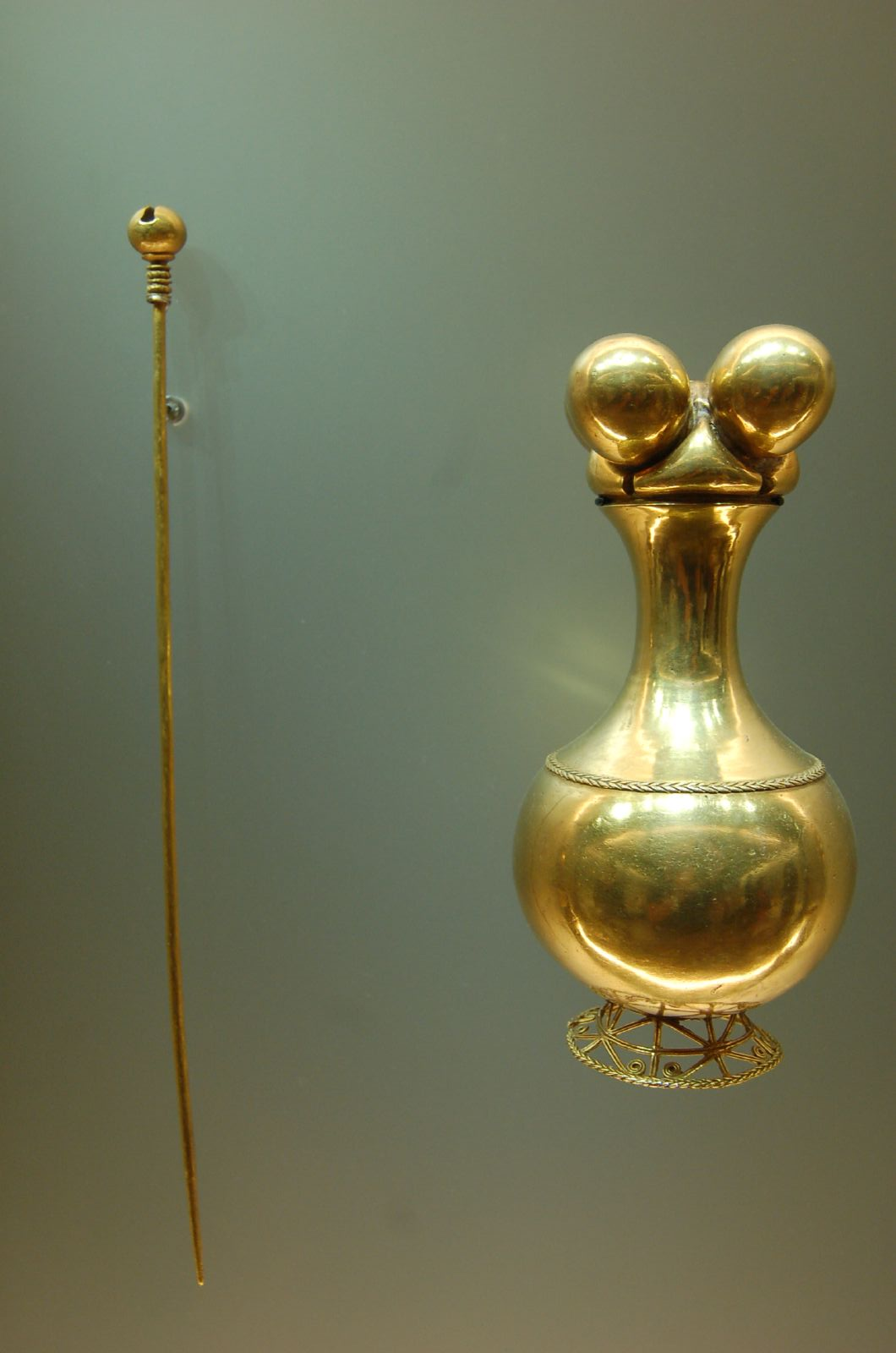
Poporo Quimbaya is the symbol of the pre-Columbian culture
