= Paul Salaman =

British ornithologist

Paul George William Salaman (born 27 January 1971) is an ornithologist and conservationist based at Conservation Allies, overseeing global biodiversity conservation.

== Life ==
In 1971, Salaman was born in Australia, where he started birding at the age of six, before moving to the UK. In 1979, Paul met David Attenborough and became enthused by conservation and natural history. From age 14 Salaman managed a local nature reserve in London and as an undergraduate in 1991, commenced a series of biodiversity expeditions across Colombia, which culminated in a series of conservation assessments and actions. In 1991, he discovered a distinctive new species of bird (vireo) to science and sold the scientific name for $75,000 as an innovative species sponsoring initiative for seeking conservation funds. In 1992, Salaman established a nature reserve in southwest Colombia and commenced Project Ognorhynchus to locate and protect the critically endangered yellow-eared parrot with Fundacion ProAves, where he is an elected advisory board member. Graduated in 2001 with a D.Phil. from the Edward Grey Institute of Field Ornithology at the University of Oxford studying threatened bird populations in southwest Colombia. A post-doc at the Natural History Museum from 2002 established Project BioMap, before coordinating biodiversity science for Conservation International across the Tropical Andes Biodiversity Hotspot. From 2005 to 2008, Salaman was director of international programs at American Bird Conservancy.

== Awards ==
- Young Ornithologist of the Year in 1988 by Royal Society for the Protection of Birds.
- BP Conservation Award overall winner in 1991
- Student Lecture Award at the Edward Grey Institute for Ornithology 1993
- Ness Award: National Young Explorer of the Year by the Royal Geographical Society (1995)
- Elected Fellow of the Royal Geographical Society

== Bird taxa described by Paul Salaman and other authors ==
- Choco vireo (Vireo masteri) (1996)
- Chestnut-capped piha (Lipaugus weberi) (2001)
- Munchique wood-wren (Henicorhina negreti) (2003)
- Upper Magdalena tapaculo (Scytalopus rodriguezi) (2005)
- Antioquia brown-banded antpitta (Grallaria milleri gilesi) (2009)
