= Inheritance (Star Trek: The Next Generation) =

- Star Trek: The Next Generation episode
- Episode no.: Season 7 Episode 10
- Directed by: Robert Scheerer
- Story by: Dan Koeppel
- Teleplay by: Dan Koeppel; René Echevarria
- Cinematography by: Jonathan West
- Production code: 262
- Original air date: November 22, 1993

Guest appearances
- Fionnula Flanagan - Juliana O'Donnell Soong Tainer; William Lithgow - Pran Tainer

Episode chronology
← Previous "Force of Nature"	Next → "Parallels"
- Star Trek: The Next Generation season 7

"Inheritance" is the 162nd episode of the American science fiction television series Star Trek: The Next Generation, the tenth episode of the seventh season.

Set in the 24th century, the series follows the adventures of the Starfleet crew of the Federation starship Enterprise-D. In this episode, as the Enterprise helps a planet to survive, Lieutenant Commander Data (Brent Spiner) must work with two local scientists from the planet. One scientist seems particularly interested in Data.

This episode marks the second of three guest appearances in Star Trek for Fionnula Flanagan, having previously appeared in the Star Trek: Deep Space Nine episode Dax.

== Plot ==
The Enterprise arrives at Altrea IV, a planet with a core that is cooling and solidifying. Pran and Juliana Tainer, scientists from Altrea IV, brief the crew on the problem; Lieutenant Commanders Geordi La Forge (LeVar Burton) and Data suggest a solution.

After the others leave the briefing, Juliana reveals herself to be the former wife of Data's creator, Noonien Soong. She explains that Data's early memories were wiped and replaced with memories of the colonists of Omicron Theta. He was about to be reactivated when the Crystalline Entity attacked. Data conducts some research and finds evidence to circumstantially support her claims, accepting her as his mother. Data shows her his quarters, where he plays his violin. She joins in with him, playing a viola. Among his paintings, she sees one of his daughter, Lal, and is saddened to learn of Lal's demise. She admits that she was against Data being created due to the problems with Lore, and confesses that she forced Noonien to leave Data behind for that reason.

An emergency requires that Juliana and Data go down to effect repairs. When finished, an incident requires them to jump to safety. Juliana is knocked unconscious when they land, and her arm becomes detached, revealing a network of circuitry; Juliana is an android.

In Juliana's positronic brain, La Forge finds a chip with a holographic interface. Data activates the chip in the holodeck and sees his father. Soong explains that his wife was human, but was mortally wounded in the Crystalline Entity's attack. He created the android and used synaptic scanning to place Juliana's memories into it. She awoke believing she was human. She later chose to leave him, and he admits that the real Juliana would have left him too. Soong asks Data to let her have her humanity. Data remarks that he suspected Juliana was an android because she exactly matched his mathematical calculations, his musicianship, and his eye blinking pattern.

Data replaces the chip into Juliana's head. When she awakens, he tells her that Dr. Crusher repaired her broken arm, and everything is fine. As Juliana prepares to leave the ship, Data tells her, "My father told me that he had only one great love in his life. I am certain he was referring to you."

== Reception ==
In 2020, GameSpot recommended this episode for background on the character of Data.

== Releases ==
"Inheritance" has been released as part of TNG Season 7 collections on DVD and Blu-Ray formats. Season seven of TNG, which contains this episode was released on Blu-ray disc in January 2015.

== See also ==
- "Datalore" - the first season episode which introduces both Lore and the Crystalline Entity
- "The Offspring" - the third season episode where Data creates a daughter, Lal
- "Brothers" - the fourth season episode where Data actually meets his creator, Dr. Soong
- "Silicon Avatar" - the fifth season episode where Data meets a scientist whose son died on Omicron Theta, and his final encounter with the Crystalline Entity
