= Dan Koeppel =

American writer

- Born: 1962 (age 63–64); US
- Occupations: Author; Columnist

Dan Koeppel (born 1962) is an American author and columnist. He has written columns for The New York Times Magazine and Popular Science, as well as having written extensively in a variety of mountain biking periodicals.

He began as an asssitant editor and sometime writer for Marvel Comics short-lived video game magazine Blip in 1983, before saxophone in a 1950s cover band. He later became the editor of the magazine Mountain Bike leaving the magazine in 1996 and contributing a column titled 'Hug the Bunny' to the magazine until it closed in 2010. He was inducted into the Mountain Bike Hall of Fame in 2003 for his journalism work. He is a former commentator for the business and radio program Marketplace, and has a writing credit for the Star Trek: The Next Generation episode "Inheritance". Dan organizes the two-day event known as bigparadeLA. It is a public walk starting at Downtown Los Angeles' Angels Flight, ends at the Hollywood Sign, above Hollywood and covers 35 miles and 101 sets of public stairways. He is perhaps best known for his first book, To See Every Bird on Earth, touted as his attempt to understand his father's obsession with listing birds. His second book, Banana: The Fate of the Fruit That Changed the World, was released in December 2007.

== Books and articles ==
- Robert Meyer and Dan Koeppel. Every Minute Is a Day: A Doctor, an Emergency Room, and a City Under Siege. New York: Crown. 2021. ISBN 978-0-593-23859-2
- Dan Koeppel, Banana: The Fate of the Fruit that Changed the World, ISBN 978-1-59463-038-5
- Dan Koeppel, The New York Times article of June 18, 2008, "Yes, We Will Have No Bananas"
