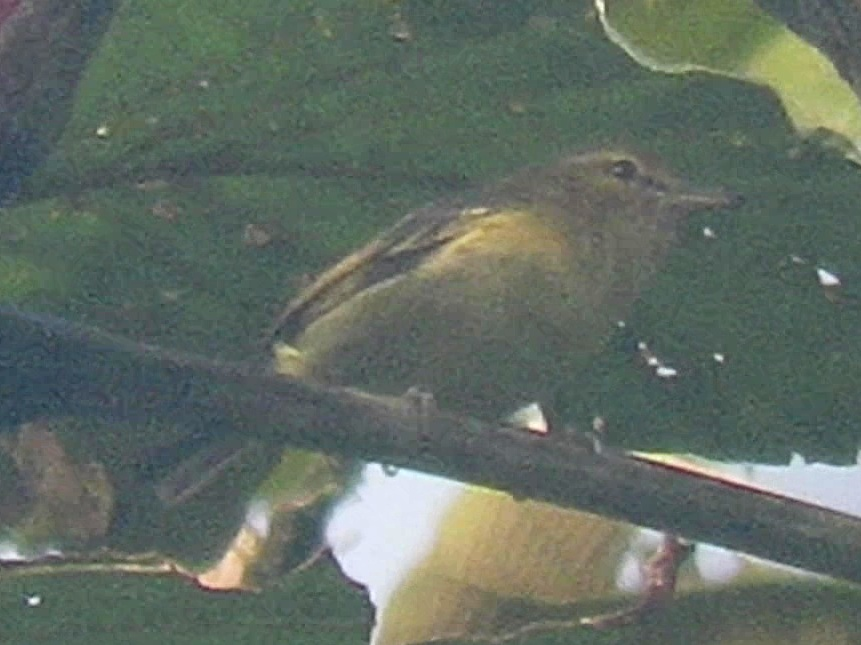
- Vireo masteri in Ecuador

Conservation status
- Near Threatened (IUCN 3.1)

Scientific classification
- Kingdom: Animalia
- Phylum: Chordata
- Class: Aves
- Order: Passeriformes
- Family: Vireonidae
- Genus: Vireo
- Species: V. masteri

Binomial name
- Vireo masteri P.G. Salaman & F.G. Stiles, 1996

= Chocó vireo =

Choco vireo

Species of bird

The Choco vireo (Note: The IOC and other taxonomic systems spell the English name with no diacritics. The IOC is the Wikipedia standard for bird names.) (Vireo masteri) is a species of bird in the family Vireonidae, the vireos, greenlets, and shrike-babblers. It is found in Colombia and Ecuador.

== Discovery ==
The Choco vireo was first observed on August 25, 1991, by Paul Salaman in southwestern Colombia's Nariño Department. The site, located at an elevation of about 1,500 m (4,900 ft), was in a narrow strip of intact, very wet forest along the Rio Nambi. In early June 1992 ornithologist Gary Stiles observed and collected the type specimen while working further north in Alto de Pisones in Risaralda Department. Salaman and Stiles took the novel approach of auctioning off the naming rights to the vireo's scientific name in order to raise money for conservation of the bird's habitat. Bernard Master, the first American birder to have seen a representative of every bird family in the world, won the auction with a bid of US $75,000 and named it Vireo masteri. This donation was used to create the Pangan ProAves Reserve in Colombia.

== Taxonomy and systematics ==
The Choco vireo is monotypic.

== Description ==
The Choco vireo is about 12.5 cm (4.9 in) long and weighs about 11 to 11.5 g (0.39 to 0.41 oz). The sexes have the same plumage. Adults have an olive crown, a yellow buff to dingy yellowish supercilium, white arcs above and below the eye, a dusky stripe from the lores through the eye, and yellow-buff ear coverts. Their nape and upperparts are olive that becomes brighter by the rump. Their wing coverts are dusky gray with wide white tips that show as two wing bars. Their primaries and secondaries are dark brown with thin yellow-green or white edges. Their central pair of rectrices are olive and the rest dark brown; the outer three pairs have pale dingy white to pale brown edges. Their throat is yellow-tinged whitish, their breast buff yellow, their belly dingy white with olive sides, and their undertail coverts straw yellow. They have a dark brown iris, a blackish maxilla, a pale dusky mandible with a paler base, and bluish gray legs and feet. Juveniles have a paler supercilium, more yellow-tinged wing bars, and paler, more creamy, underparts than adults.

== Distribution and habitat ==
The Choco vireo is a bird of the Chocó region, which is famed for its high biological diversity. As of 2023 it was known from only four locations between Colombia's Alto de Pisiones in the north and near La Delicia, Pichincha Province, Ecuador in the south. Searches between those areas have not found the species.

The Choco vireo primarily inhabits the interior and edges of primary rainforest on both level ground and on steep slopes. Its habitat is characterized by a canopy about 20 to 30 m (65 to 100 ft) high with gaps made by fallen trees; the trees are heavy with moss and epiphytes. One source states that its elevational span is 1,200 to 2,100 m (3,900 to 6,900 ft) and another says 800 to 1,600 m (2,600 to 5,200 ft).

== Behavior ==
=== Movement ===
As far as is known, the Choco vireo is a sedentary year-round resident.

=== Feeding ===
The Choco vireo's diet is not known in detail but includes both adult and larval insects. It takes most prey by gleaning from the undersides of leaves while perched and sometimes hanging upside-down. It typically feeds singly or in pairs, and usually in the forest's subcanopy and canopy though sometimes lower at edges and in treefall gaps. It often joins mixed-species feeding flocks as they pass through its territory but seldom continues beyond the territory's boundary.

=== Breeding ===
The Choco vireo is believed to breed during the dry season of June to October. Its nest has not been described and the clutch size is not known. The incubation period and time to fledging are each believed to be about 13 days.

=== Vocalization ===
The Choco vireo's typical song has about ten syllables, lasts about 2 seconds, and has a three-part structure. The species sings year-round, typically from a perch in the forest canopy.

== Status ==
The IUCN originally in 1994 assessed the Choco vireo as Vulnerable, then in 2000 as Endangered, and since 2019 as Near Threatened. Though its overall range is about 34,500 km^{2} (13,300 sq mi) it is estimated to actually occur in only about 2,350 km^{2} (900 sq mi) of it. Its estimated population of between 14,200 and 17,000 mature individuals is believed to be decreasing. "The range and population of Choco Vireo are in decline as a consequence of habitat destruction" by clearing for timber, agriculture, mining, and human habitation. Even some nominally protected areas are subject to illegal clearing.
