= To See Every Bird on Earth =

2005 book by Dan Koeppel

- First US edition
- Author: Dan Koeppel
- Subject: Birdwatching
- Publisher: Hudson Street Press-Penguin Group
- Publication date: 2005
- Pages: 304
- ISBN: 1-59463-001-1
- OCLC: 57414552
- Dewey Decimal: 598/.072/34 22
- LC Class: QL677.5 .K614 2005
- Followed by: Banana: The Fate of the Fruit That Changed the World

To See Every Bird on Earth: A Father, a Son, and a Lifetime Obsession is a book by Dan Koeppel first published in 2005. It is about the author's relationship with his father Richard Koeppel, an obsessive "Big Lister" birdwatcher who had spotted over 7000 different species of birds at the time the book was written. The book focuses on Dan Koeppel's attempts to understand the obsession that ruled his father's life. It also examines the culture of highly competitive birders who travel the world making lists of their sightings, and discusses the history and rules of listing. Richard Koeppel was diagnosed with cancer in 2000, which curtailed his birding and forced him to switch to butterflies found locally near his home on Long Island, New York. He died of cancer-related causes on August 2, 2012.
