= Bernard Master =

American conservationist (born 1941)

Bernard F. Master
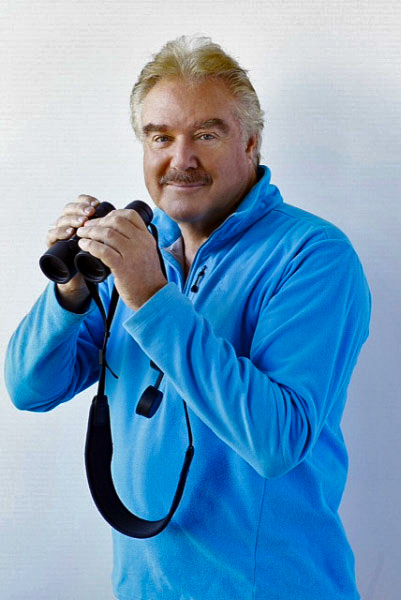
- Born: 17 May 1941 (age 85)
- Occupations: Conservationist, physician, entrepreneur

Bernard F. Master (born May 17, 1941) is a conservationist, health care professional, and entrepreneur. He earned his medical degree at Philadelphia College of Osteopathic Medicine, where he is now Professor of Clinical Medicine, Emeritus, before serving as a medical doctor for more than 30 years. He is an avid birder and the namesake for the Chocó vireo (Vireo masteri). Master is among the few birders to have seen a representative of nearly all extant bird families and has observed more than 8,585 birds in the wild from 128 countries and territories. He is the author of No Finish Line: Discovering the World's Secrets One Bird at a Time.

== Early life and education ==
Master was born in Philadelphia to Gilbert and Leona Master. His interest in birding started when he was four years old, at the encouragement of his father whom he would accompany on bird walks. His family's vacation home in North Wildwood, New Jersey was near Cape May Bird Observatory, a popular birding site that lies in the path of the largest fall migration in eastern North America. He graduated from Overbrook High School (Philadelphia) in 1958 and in 1962 earned a Bachelor of Science from Ursinus College. Master graduated from Philadelphia College of Osteopathic Medicine in 1966 and began his medical career.

== Military and medical career ==
In 1968, Master was drafted into the Vietnam War and served one year as a battalion surgeon in the U.S. Army's 5th Infantry Division (Mechanized) which defended the Vietnamese Demilitarized Zone in northern Quảng Trị province. He spent another year as Post Surgeon for the U.S. Army's Medical Intelligence and Information Agency. Master was awarded a Bronze Star with oak leaf cluster and Combat Medical Badge for his service. Master was mentioned by Sherrell Byrd (Army Sergeant in the Vietnam War, 1961-1975) in an oral history interview of Byrd archived in the Library of Congress (Collection Number: AFC/2001/001/93528). In the interview, the Lavell Byrd, Jr. Collection, Sherrell recounts his experiences in Vietnam, and identifies "Captain Bernard Master" as the battalion surgeon Captain who worked on his severely wounded body in a helicopter.

Following military discharge, Master spent the next 30 years as a primary care physician in Columbus, Ohio. During this time, he founded two medical health care companies. In the 1970s he opened ten MEDCenter locations, which provided full-service outpatient services to inner-city residents. In 1985, he founded HealthPower, Inc., a managed care company that provided services to Ohio Medicaid patients. Health Power, Inc. went public in 1994 and he sold the company in 2000.

Over the course of ten years, Master was appointed by three Ohio State governors to chair the Ohio Medical Quality Foundation, a group charged with funding state medical programs that improve the lives and health of Ohio residents. He also endowed minority scholarship funds at Heritage College of Osteopathic Medicine at Ohio University, Ohio State University, and Temple University. In recognition of his practice's focus on serving the health needs of Columbus's inner-city families, Master was the 1995 recipient of the Martin Luther King award by the Columbus Education Association, a union of central Ohio teachers.

== Bird watching and wildlife conservation ==
After retiring in 2005, Master began to focus on birding, wildlife conservation, and sponsorships of local events. Master sponsored the Bernard Master Doubles Classic, the longest running professional tennis tournament in Ohio, from 1978 to 2024. In 2004, he became a founding board member of the Ohio Ornithological Society. Master also sponsored the long-running "Moonlight on the Marsh" distinguished lecture series led by the late Bill Mitsch at Florida Gulf Coast University (Naples, Florida). Master was a frequent birdwatching guide and speaker for this and other organizations.

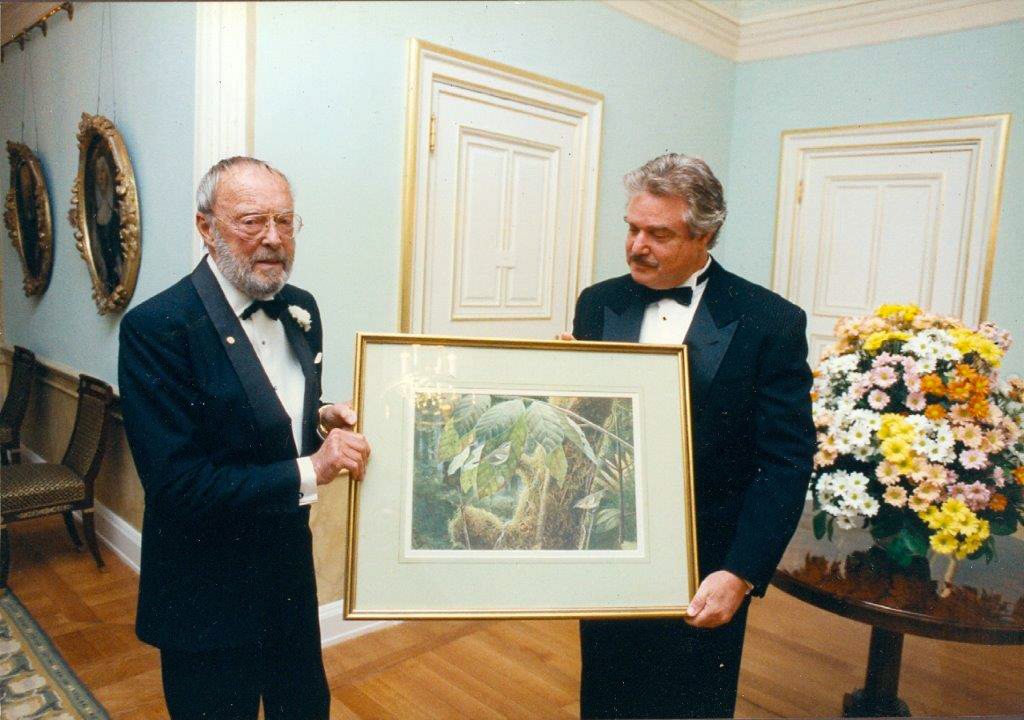
Master's contributions to world bird conservation were honored by Prince Bernhard of the Netherlands who helped found the World Wide Fund for Nature.

He was vice chair of the Ohio Chapter of The Nature Conservancy for eleven years and earned its highest honor, the Oak Leaf Award, for his contributions to its mission. For 16 years, he served on the board of trustees for the Columbus Zoo and Aquarium. The Zoo unveiled its new Dr. Bernard Master Aviary on May 19, 2021.

In 1994, Master received naming rights for a new species of vireo (Passeriformes: Vireonidae) from the Western Andes of Colombia. The Chocó vireo was first observed on August 25, 1991, by Paul Salaman in western Nariño in southwest Colombia and later collected by ornithologist Gary Stiles. The discoverers auctioned naming rights to fund habitat conservation. Master won the bid, and his donation was used to create the Río Nambí Community Natural Reserve.. He named the species Vireo masteri.

Master's contributions to bird conservation were honored by Prince Bernhard of Lippe-Biesterfeld, who helped found the World Wide Fund for Nature.

In 2015, Master published his autobiography entitled No Finish Line: Discovering the World's Secrets One Bird at a Time. In it, Master documents his world birding adventures and pays homage to his colleagues and experiences in Vietnam.
