= Cocora Valley =

Valley in Quindío, Colombia

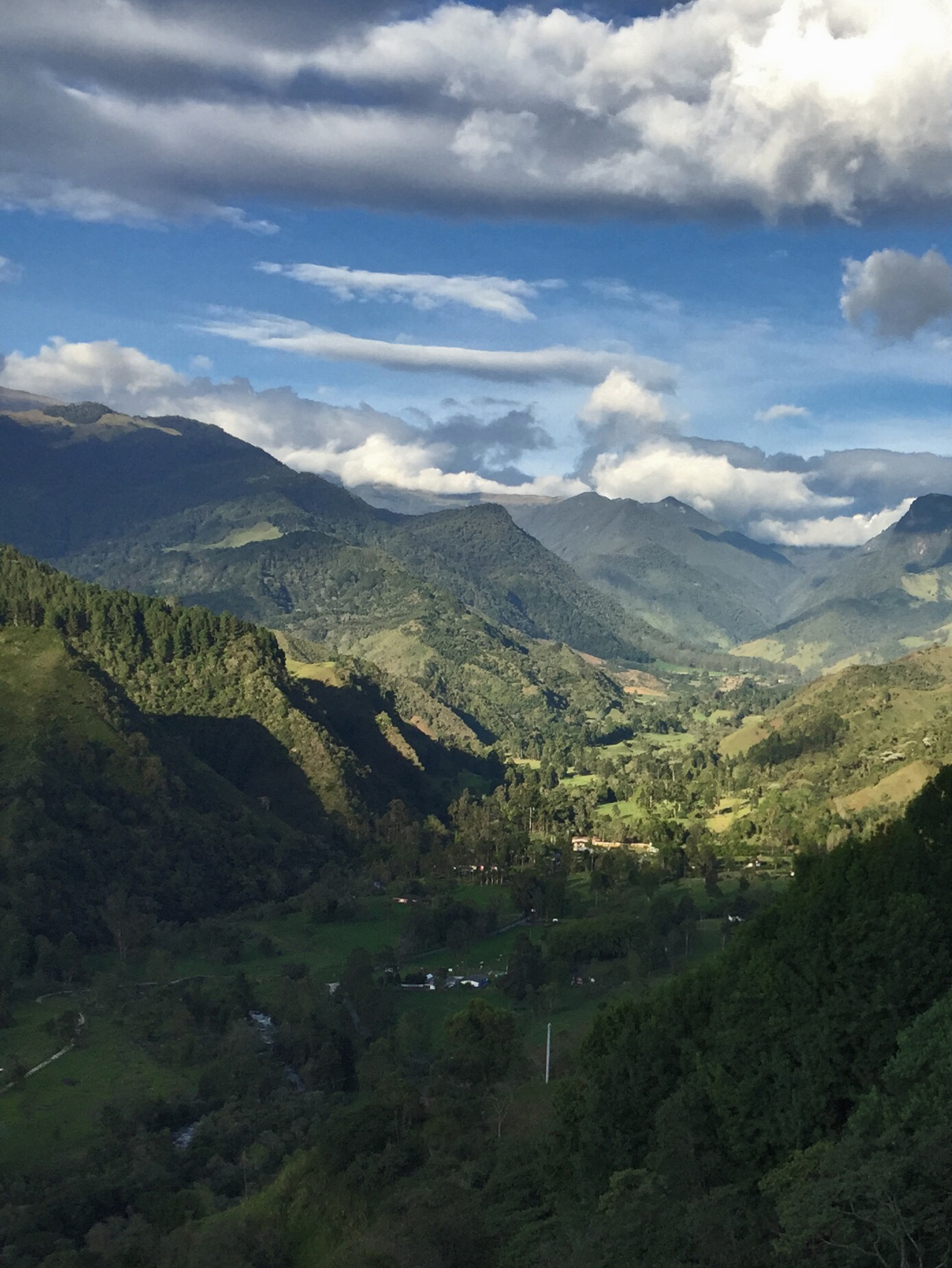
- View of Valle de Cocora with mountains and clouds
- Interactive map of Cocora Valley
- Location: Quindío
- Nearest city: Salento
- Coordinates: 4°38′N 75°29′W
- Established: September 1985
- Visitors: 150,000
- Governing body: Parques Nacionales Naturales de Colombia

The Cocora Valley (Spanish: Valle de Cocora) is a valley in the Quindío Department of Colombia. It is located in the Central Cordillera of the Andean mountains. "Cocora" was the name of a Quimbayan princess, daughter of the local chief Acaime, and means "star of water" (Spanish: estrella de agua).

The valley is part of the Los Nevados National Natural Park, incorporated into the existing national park by the Colombian government in 1985. It is the main location where the national tree of Colombia, the Quindío wax palm (Ceroxylon quindiuense) can be found, as well as a wide variety of other flora and fauna (some endangered), all of which are protected under the park's national status.

== Location ==
The Cocora Valley is located on the upper reaches of the Quindío River, the main river of the namesake department, located at an altitude between 1800 and 2400 meters. The valley is approximately 24 km north-east of the departmental capital Armenia, and accessed via a junction from the Armenia-Pereira highway, running via Boquia to the town of Salento. Vehicles (either private cars or jeep taxis from Salento) can then travel 11 km further on up into the valley as far as "Cocora", a collection of campsites and restaurants - other parts of the valley can only be accessed either by hiking on the numerous trails or horseback.

The Cocora Valley is part of a larger national park, the Los Nevados National Natural Park (Spanish: Parque Nacional Natural de Los Nevados). The park covers an area of 58,000 hectares (580 km^{2}) in total, including the north-eastern part of Quindío.

== History of the valley's protection ==
To prevent the exploitation of the wax palm and the threat against the endemic species dependent on the palm, mainly due to the celebrations of Palm Sunday, the government of Belisario Betancur proposed the creation of a wildlife sanctuary and the preservation of the wax palm as the national symbol of Colombia. Law 61 of 1985 was ratified on 16 September 1985 with the following terms:

- "1. The species with the scientific name ceroxylon quindiuense, commonly known as the wax palm is declared to be the national tree and symbol of Colombia."
- "2. In strict accordance with the plans and development programmes the National Government is authorized to carry out the corresponding financial transactions, obtain loans, and sign the necessary contracts, for the purpose of acquiring land in the Central Cordillera which is not owned by the nation, to create one or more national parks or wildlife sanctuaries with the purpose of preserving this national symbol and maintaining its natural environment."
- "3. The felling of the wax palm tree is forbidden and punishable with a fine, which may be converted into arrest in the municipality where the infraction was committed, in accordance with the Decree-Law 2811 of 1974."
- "4. This Law takes effect from the date of its sanction."

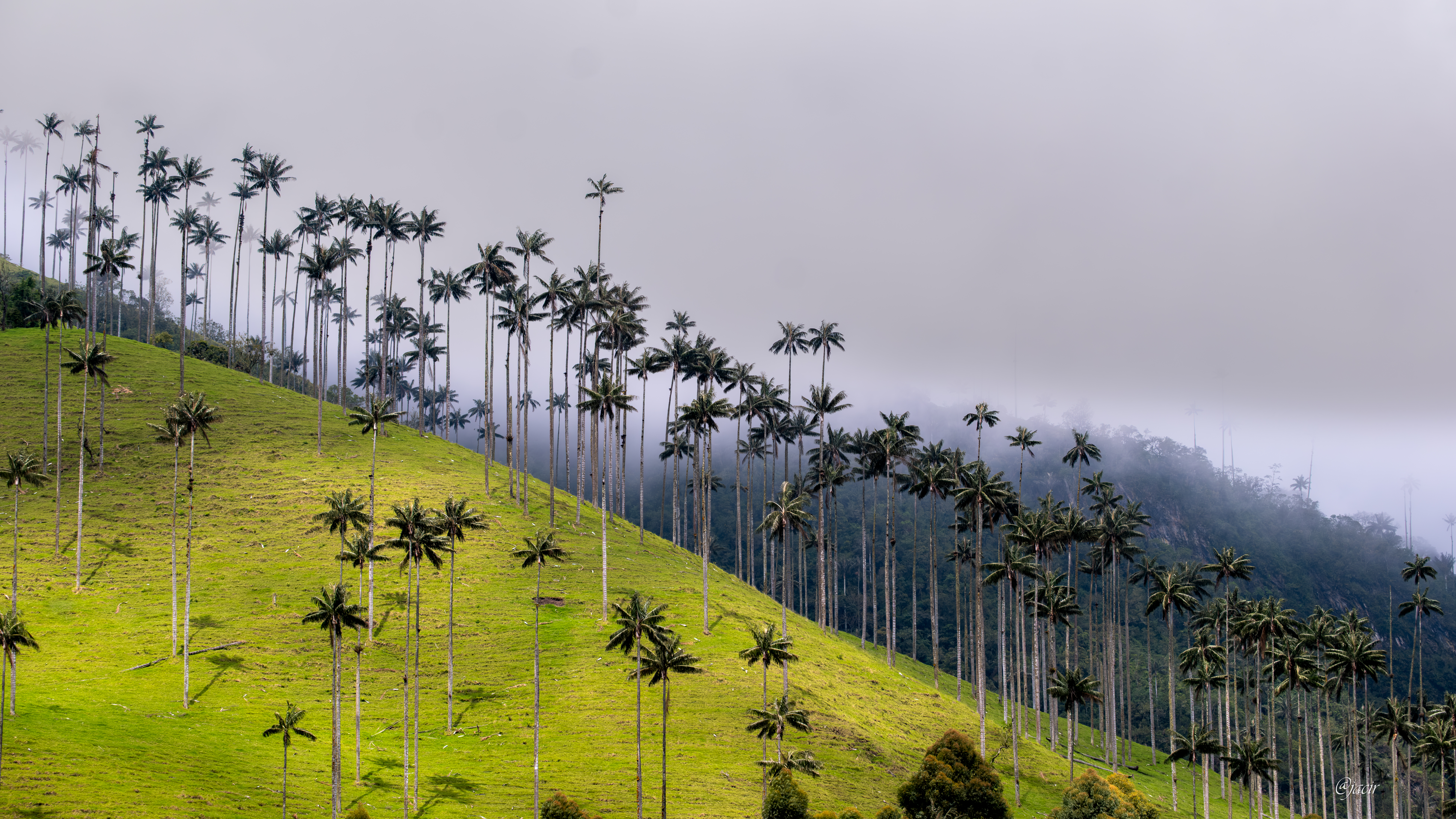
Wax palms in Cocora Valley

== Climate ==
The Cocora valley is characterized by its temperate weather, due to its altitude. The prevailing westerly winds from the Pacific Ocean are stopped by the Andean mountains, creating a humid environment favorable to the growth of cloud forest at higher altitudes: rain falls almost daily. Temperatures vary dramatically, even within one day. The average annual temperature is 15 °C (59 °F), with a maximum of 25 °C (77 °F) and a minimum of 12 °C (54 °F).

Köppen-Geiger climate classification system classifies its climate as subtropical highland (Cfb).

== Gallery ==
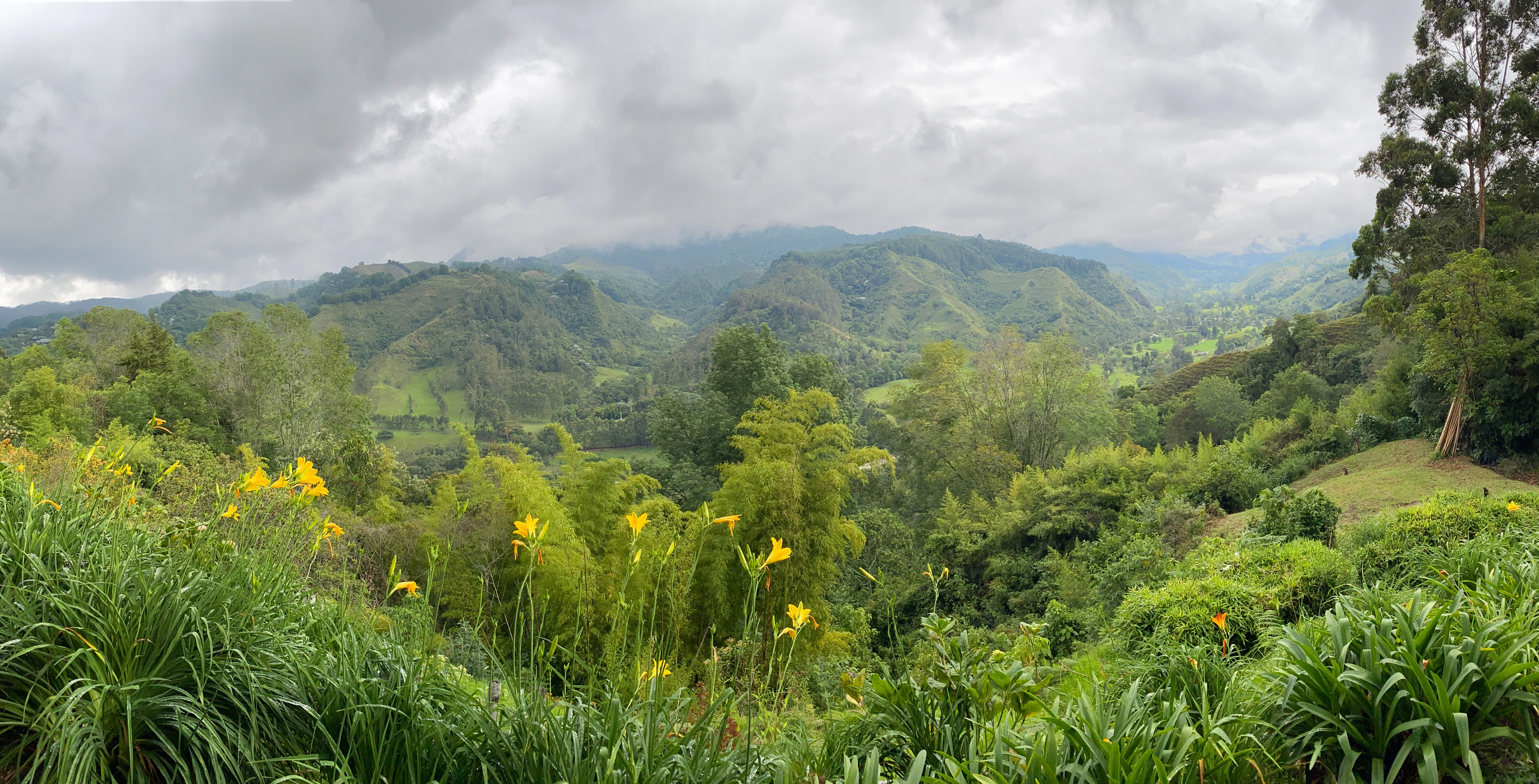
Valle de Cocora - General View

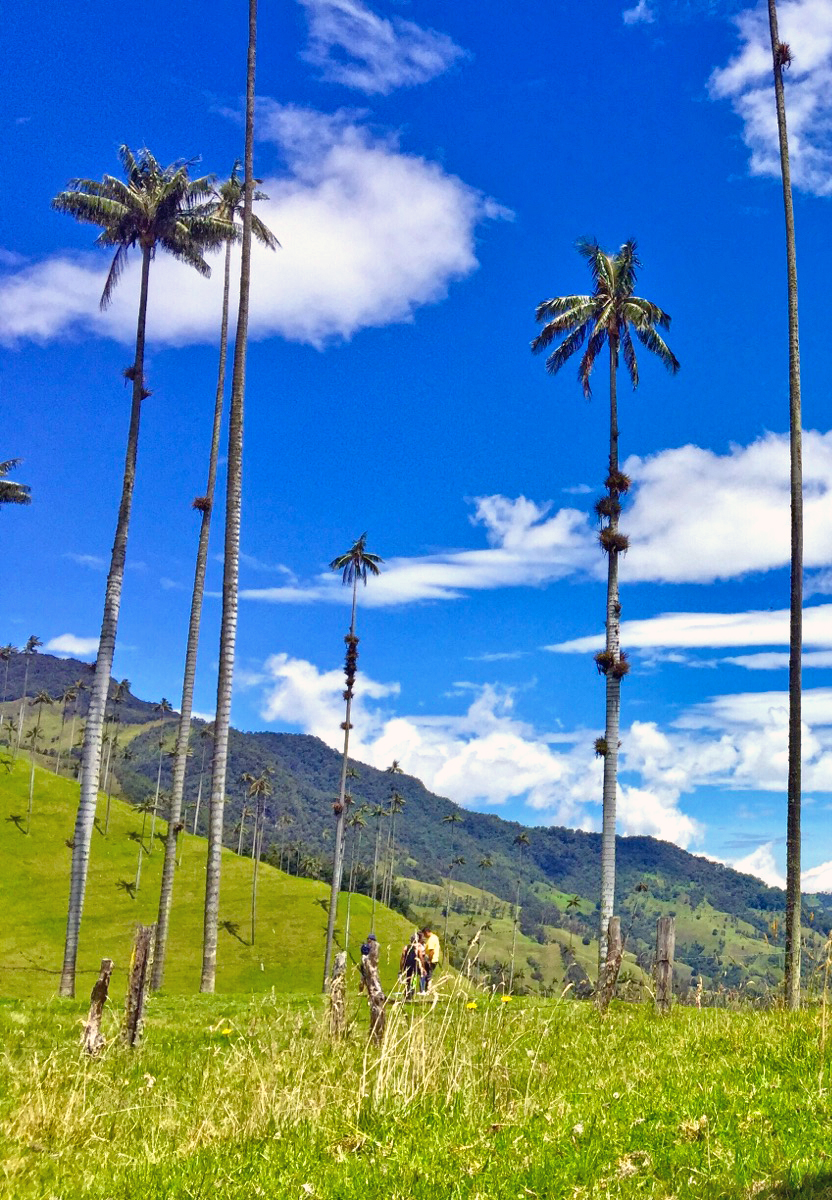
Wax palms

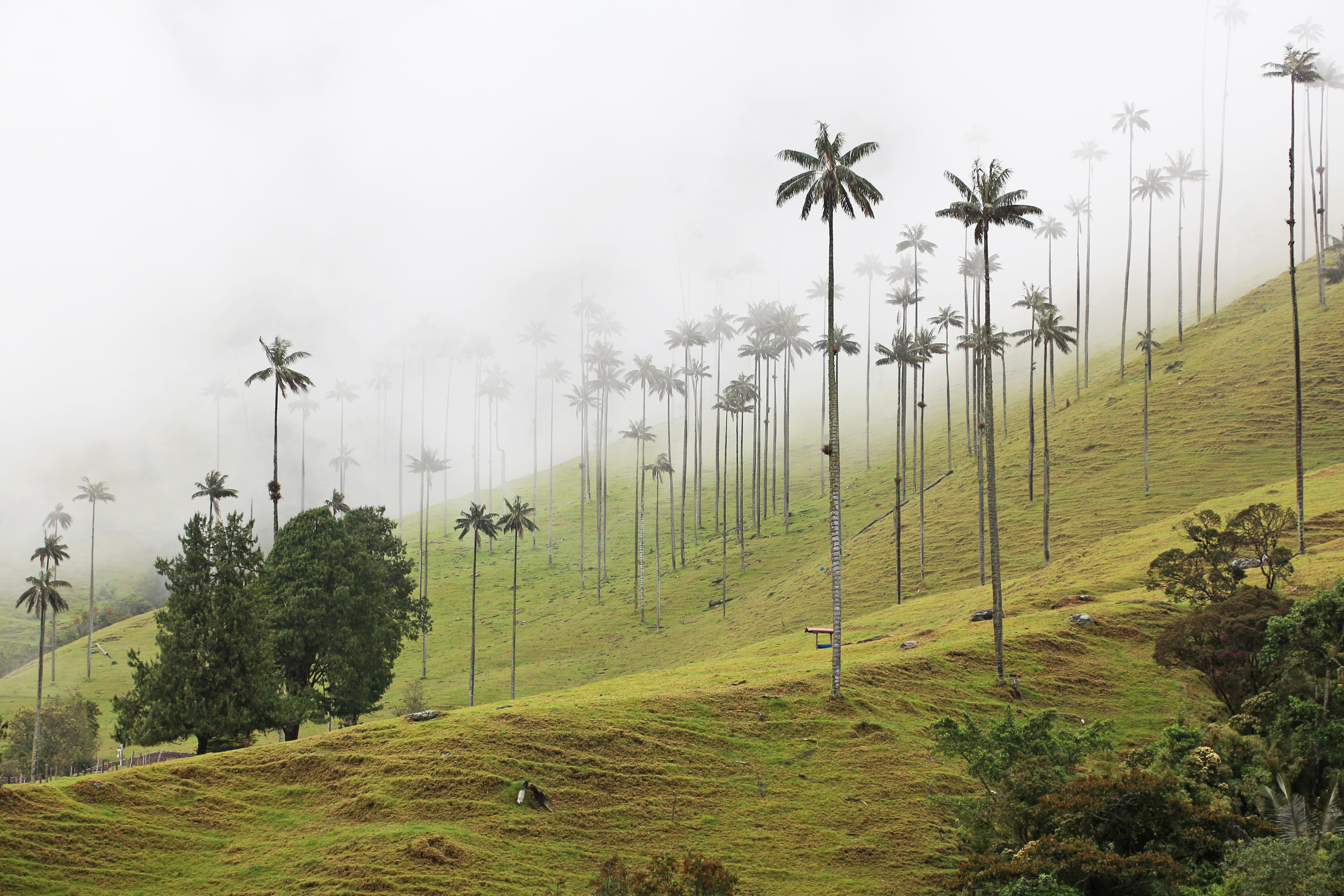
Hill with Wax Palms in Valle de Cocora

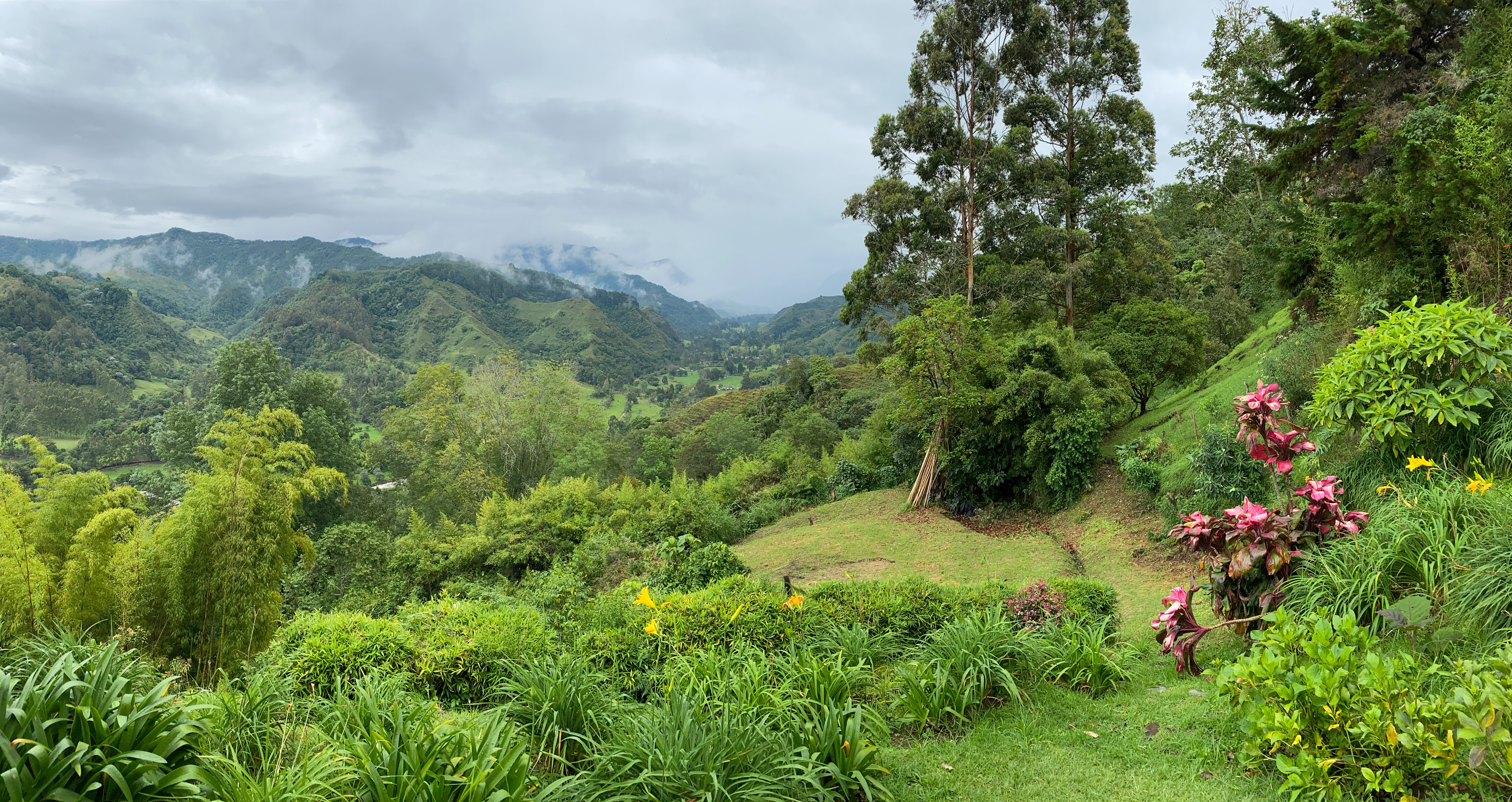
Valle de Cocora

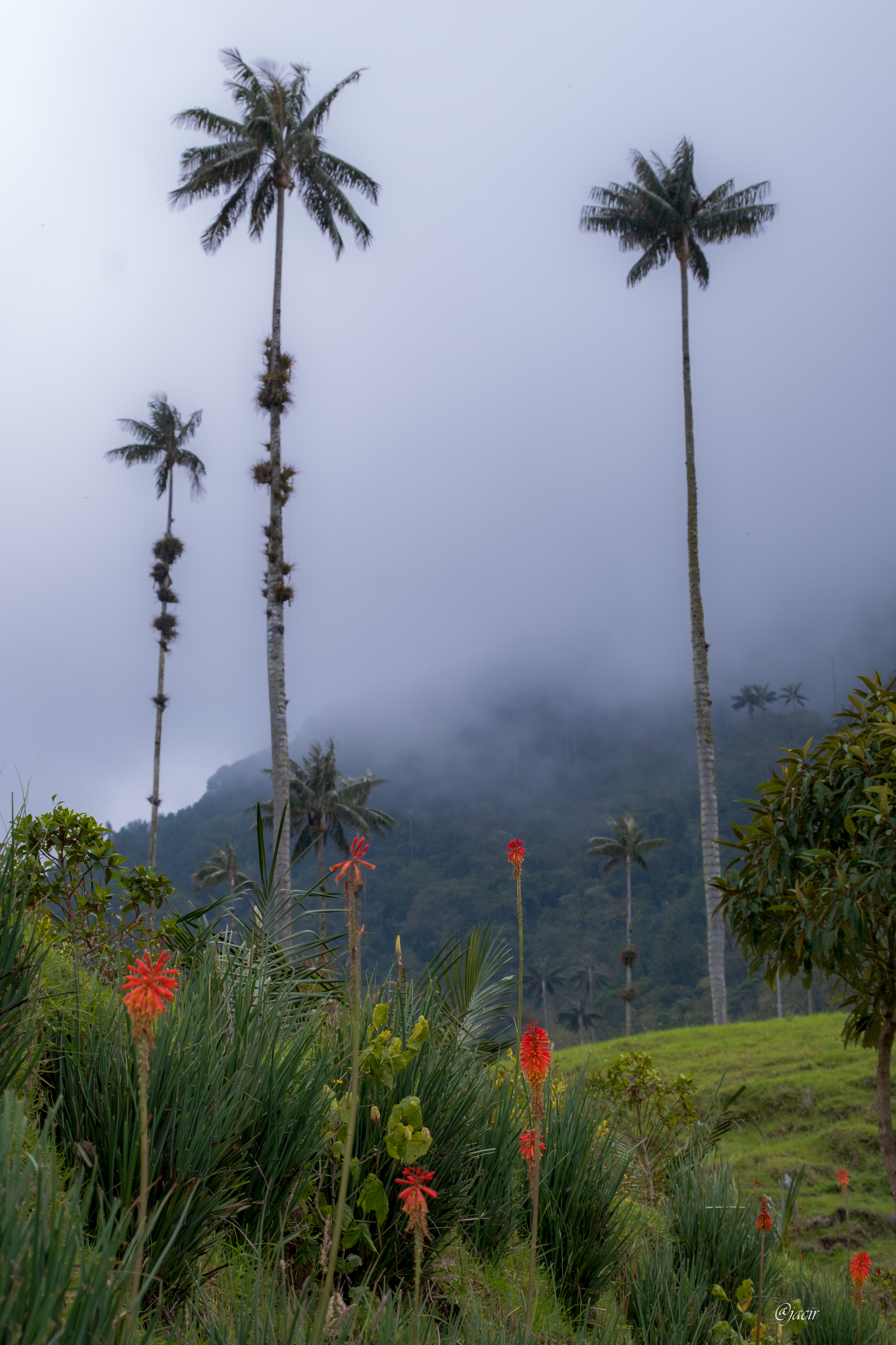
Wild flowers at cocora valley

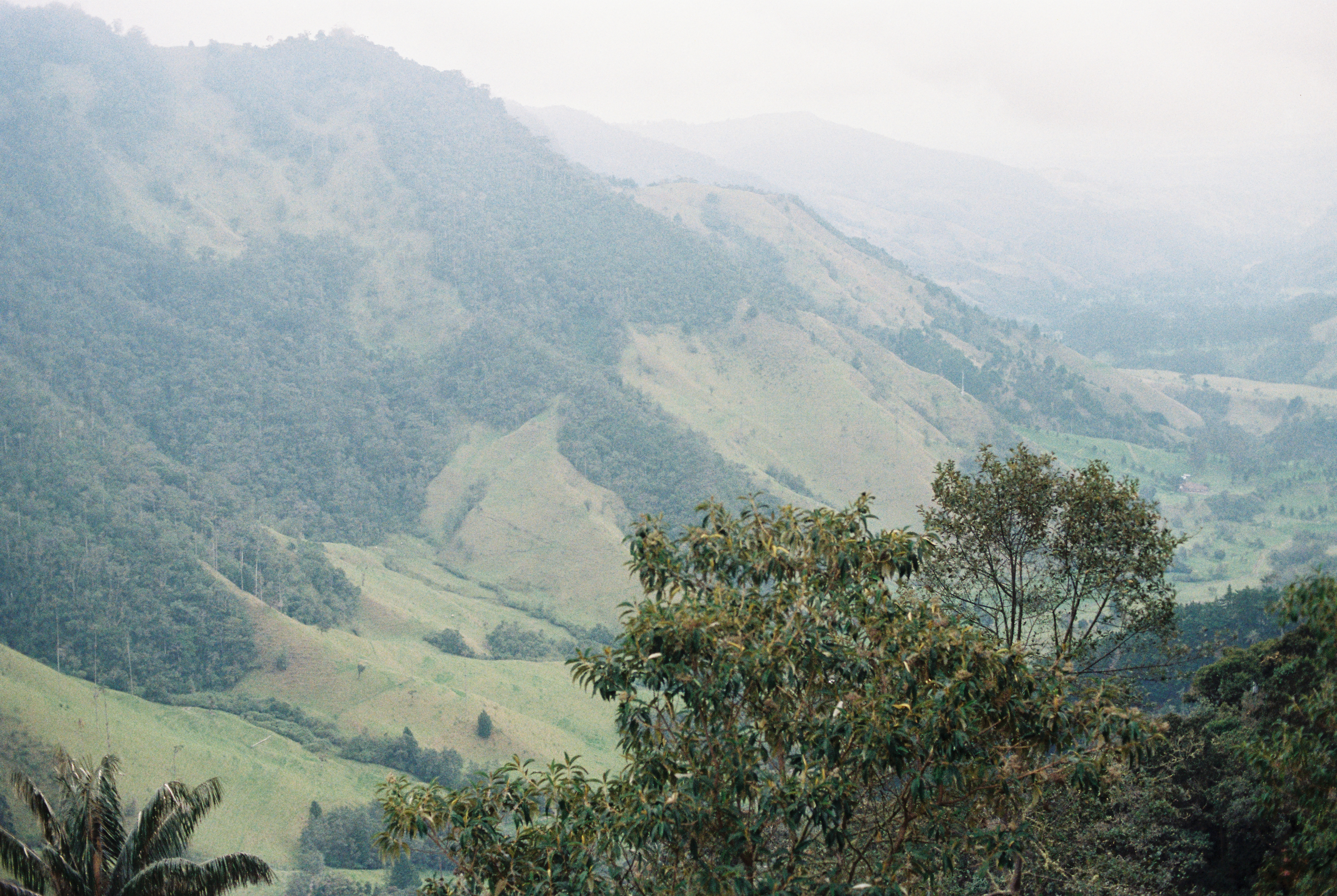
View of Valle de Cocora

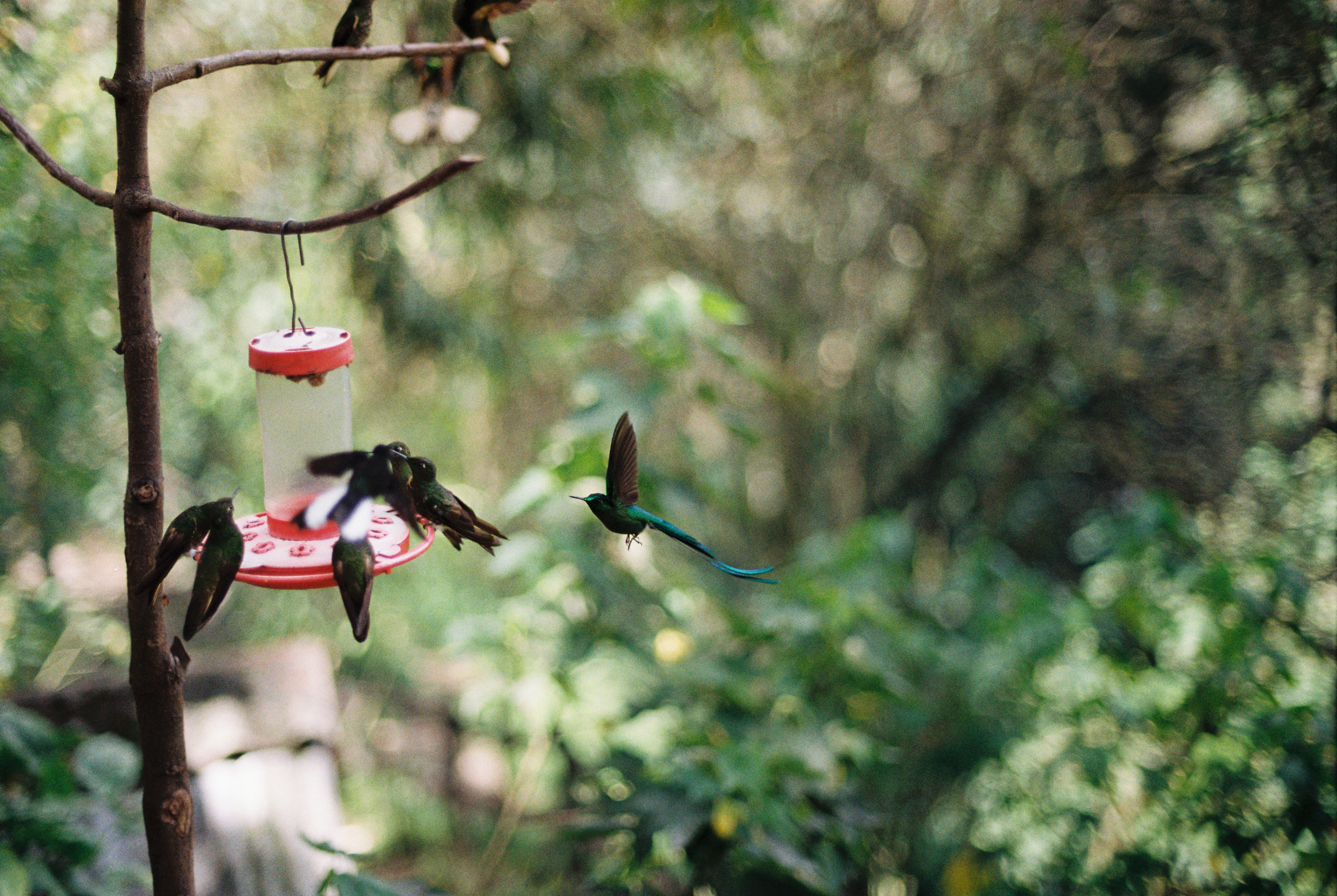
Hummingbirds at Cocora Valley

Climate data for Cocora
Month	Jan	Feb	Mar	Apr	May	Jun	Jul	Aug	Sep	Oct	Nov	Dec	Year
Mean daily maximum °C (°F)	19.3 (66.7)	19.4 (66.9)	19.3 (66.7)	18.8 (65.8)	18.9 (66.0)	18.7 (65.7)	19.3 (66.7)	19.1 (66.4)	19 (66)	18.1 (64.6)	18.4 (65.1)	18.8 (65.8)	18.9 (66.0)
Daily mean °C (°F)	14.4 (57.9)	14.6 (58.3)	14.7 (58.5)	14.55 (58.19)	14.8 (58.6)	14.5 (58.1)	14.6 (58.3)	14.6 (58.3)	14.4 (57.9)	13.9 (57.0)	14.1 (57.4)	14.2 (57.6)	14.45 (58.01)
Mean daily minimum °C (°F)	9.6 (49.3)	9.9 (49.8)	10.2 (50.4)	10.2 (50.4)	10.7 (51.3)	10.3 (50.5)	9.9 (49.8)	10.1 (50.2)	9.9 (49.8)	9.8 (49.6)	9.8 (49.6)	9.6 (49.3)	10.0 (50.0)
Average precipitation mm (inches)	116 (4.6)	131 (5.2)	170 (6.7)	231 (9.1)	217 (8.5)	136 (5.4)	95 (3.7)	99 (3.9)	142 (5.6)	279 (11.0)	245 (9.6)	151 (5.9)	2,012 (79.2)
Source: Climate-Data.org (altitude: 2387m)

== Flora and fauna ==
The valley is the location of the majority of the remaining populations of the wax palm (Ceroxylon quindiuense). Other flora and fauna that may be found in the valley include

=== Flora ===
- pino romeron (Retrophyllum rospigilosii)
- sietecueros (Andesanthus lepidotus, syn. Tibouchina lepidota)
- encenillo (Weinmannia tormentosa)
- arnica
- frailejones (Espeletia)
- puya

=== Fauna ===
- mountain tapir (Tapirus pinchaque)
- spectacled bear (Tremarctos ornatus)
- puma (Puma concolor)
- sloths
- yellow-eared parrot (Ognorhynchus icterotis)
- black-billed mountain-toucan (Andigena nigrirostris)
- Andean guan (Penelope montagnii)
- Andean condor (Vultur gryphus)
- hummingbirds (Trochilidae)

3 km north-east of "Cocora" up a dirt track is the finca "La Montaña" where there is a nursery for the wax palm.

5 km east of "Cocora" along a trail that may be accessed on foot or on horseback is the Acaime Natural Reserve. The reserve contains 6 to 8 species of hummingbirds as well as other birds and wildlife, as well as a visitor center and restaurant.

== Tourism ==
The Cocora valley is a very popular tourist destination in Colombia. The majority of visitors make day visits from Salento, or come for the extensive camping and hiking opportunities in the valley and the national park. Other common activities are bird watching, mountain biking, horse riding, rafting, scenic flights, and swimming in the rivers. The local restaurants specialize in cooking locally farmed freshwater trout in several ways, mainly baked and served in a variety of sauces with patacones (plantain fritters).

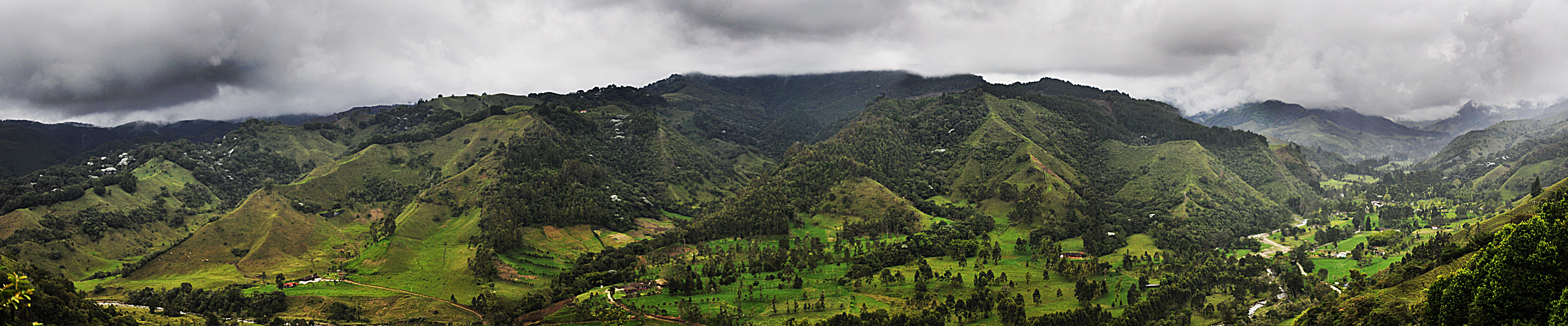
Panoramic view of Cocora Valley
