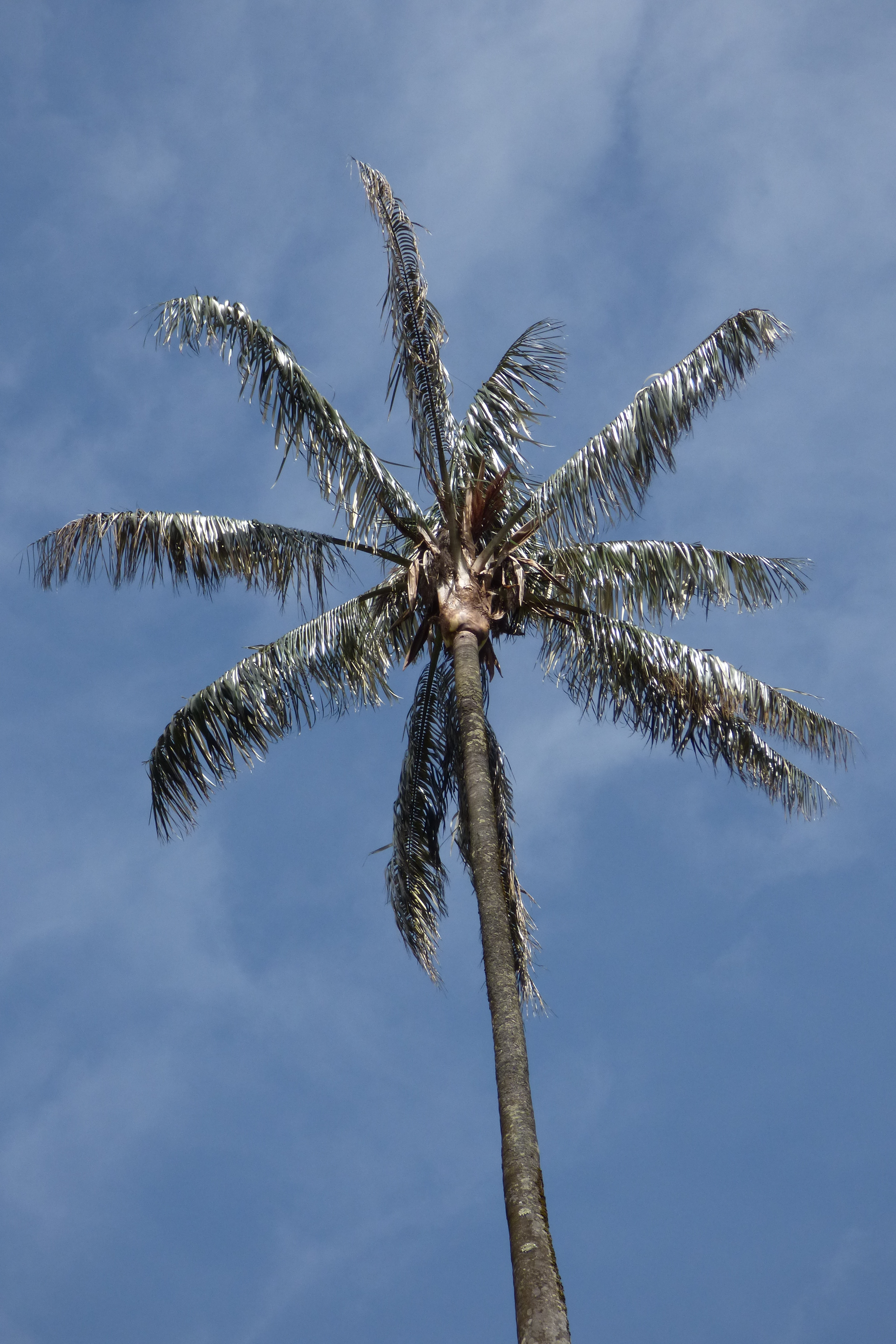
- At Armenia, Colombia.

Conservation status
- Critically Endangered (IUCN 3.1)

Scientific classification
- Kingdom: Plantae
- Clade: Tracheophytes
- Clade: Angiosperms
- Clade: Monocots
- Clade: Commelinids
- Order: Arecales
- Family: Arecaceae
- Genus: Ceroxylon
- Species: C. quindiuense

Binomial name
- Ceroxylon quindiuense (H.Karst.) H.Wendl.

Synonyms
- Ceroxylon floccosum Burret; Klopstockia quindiuensis H.Karst.

= Ceroxylon quindiuense =

Species of palm

Ceroxylon quindiuense, often called Quindío wax palm, is a palm native to the humid montane forests of the Andes in Colombia and Peru.

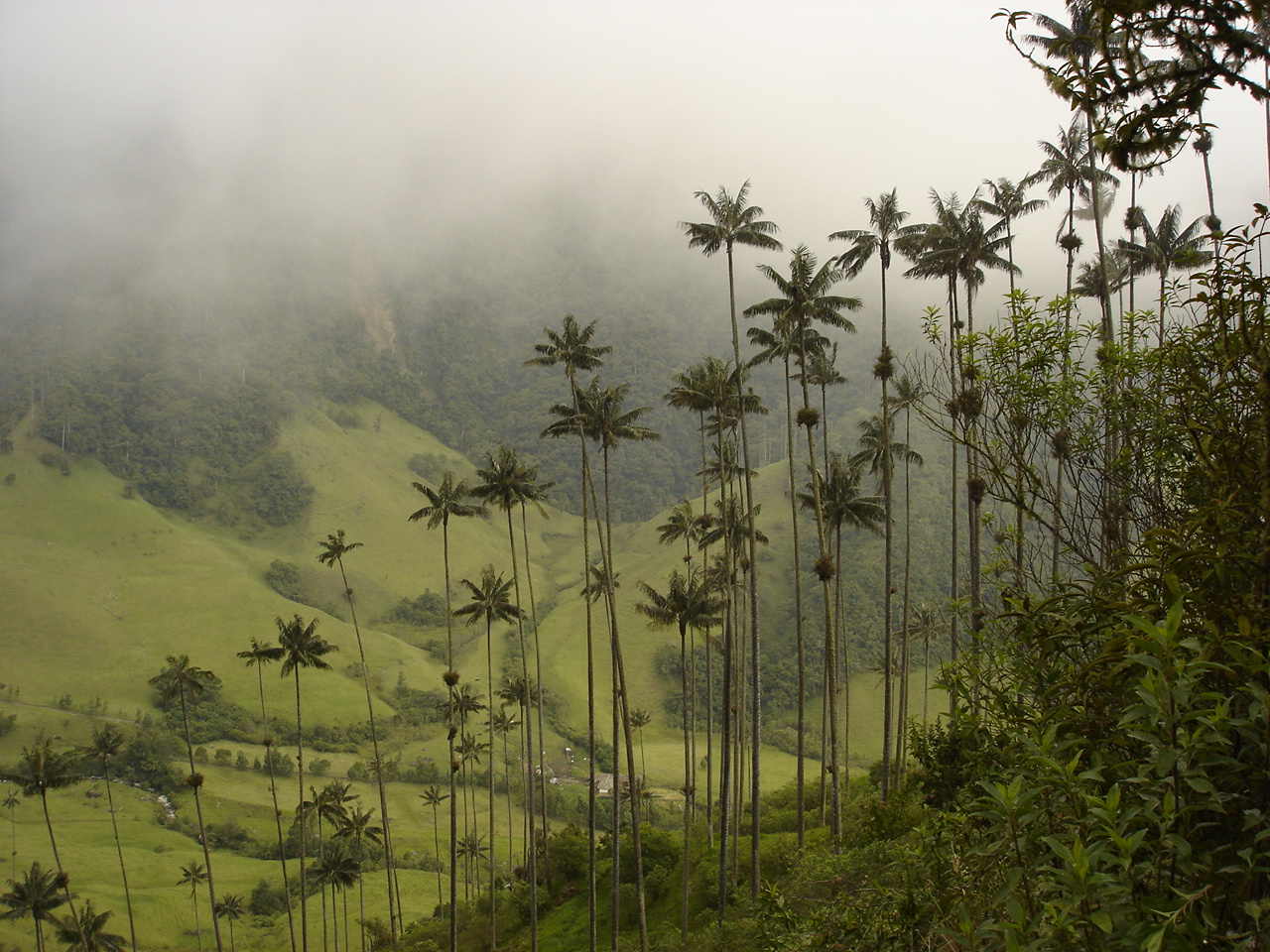
View of Cocora valley (Colombia) with Ceroxylon quindiuense palms

== Description ==
This palm species can grow to a height of 45 m (148 ft) —or rarely, even as high as 60 m (200 ft). It is the tallest recorded monocot in the world. The trunk is cylindrical, smooth, light colored, covered with wax; leaf scars forming dark rings around the trunk. The leaves are dark green and grayish, 185–540 cm (6.1–17.7 ft) long, with a petiole up to 80 cm (31 in). Fruits are globose and orange-red when ripe, 1.6–2 cm (0.6–0.8 in) in diameter.

== Taxonomy ==
Ceroxylon quindiuense was described by Gustav Karl Wilhelm Hermann Karsten and published in Bonplandia (Hannover) 8: 70. (1860).

Etymology:

Ceroxylon: generic name composed of the Greek words: kērós = "wax" and xýlon = "wood", in reference to the thick white wax found on the trunks. quindiuense: geographical epithet alluding to its location in Quindío.

Synonymy:

- Klopstockia quindiuensis H.Karst
- Ceroxylon floccosum Burret

== Ecology ==
It grows in large and dense populations along the central and eastern Andes of Colombia (rarely in the western Colombian Andes), with a disjunct distribution in the Andes of northern Peru. The elevational range of this species is between 2,000 and 3,100 m (6,600 and 10,200 ft) above sea level. It achieves a minimum reproductive age at 80 years. Wax palms provide habitats for many unique life forms, including endangered species such as the yellow-eared parrot (Ognorhynchus icterotis).

== Vernacular names ==
Palma de cera, palma de ramo (both names in Colombia).

== Conservation ==
Populations of Ceroxylon quindiuense are threatened by habitat disturbance, overharvesting and diseases. The fruit was used as feed for cattle and pigs. The leaves were extensively used in the Catholic celebrations of Palm Sunday; such leaves coming from young individuals which were damaged to death. That activity has been reduced severely in recent years due to law enforcement and widespread campaign. Felling of Ceroxylon quindiuense palms to obtain wax from the trunk also is an activity still going on in Colombia and Peru. The palm is recognized as the national tree of Colombia, and since the implementation of Law 61 of 1985, it is legally a protected species in that country.

== Cultivation and uses ==
The wax of the trunk was used to make candles, especially in the 19th century. The outer part of the stem of the palm has been used locally for building houses, and was used to build water supply systems for impoverished farmers. It is cultivated as an ornamental plant in Colombia and California.

== Gallery ==
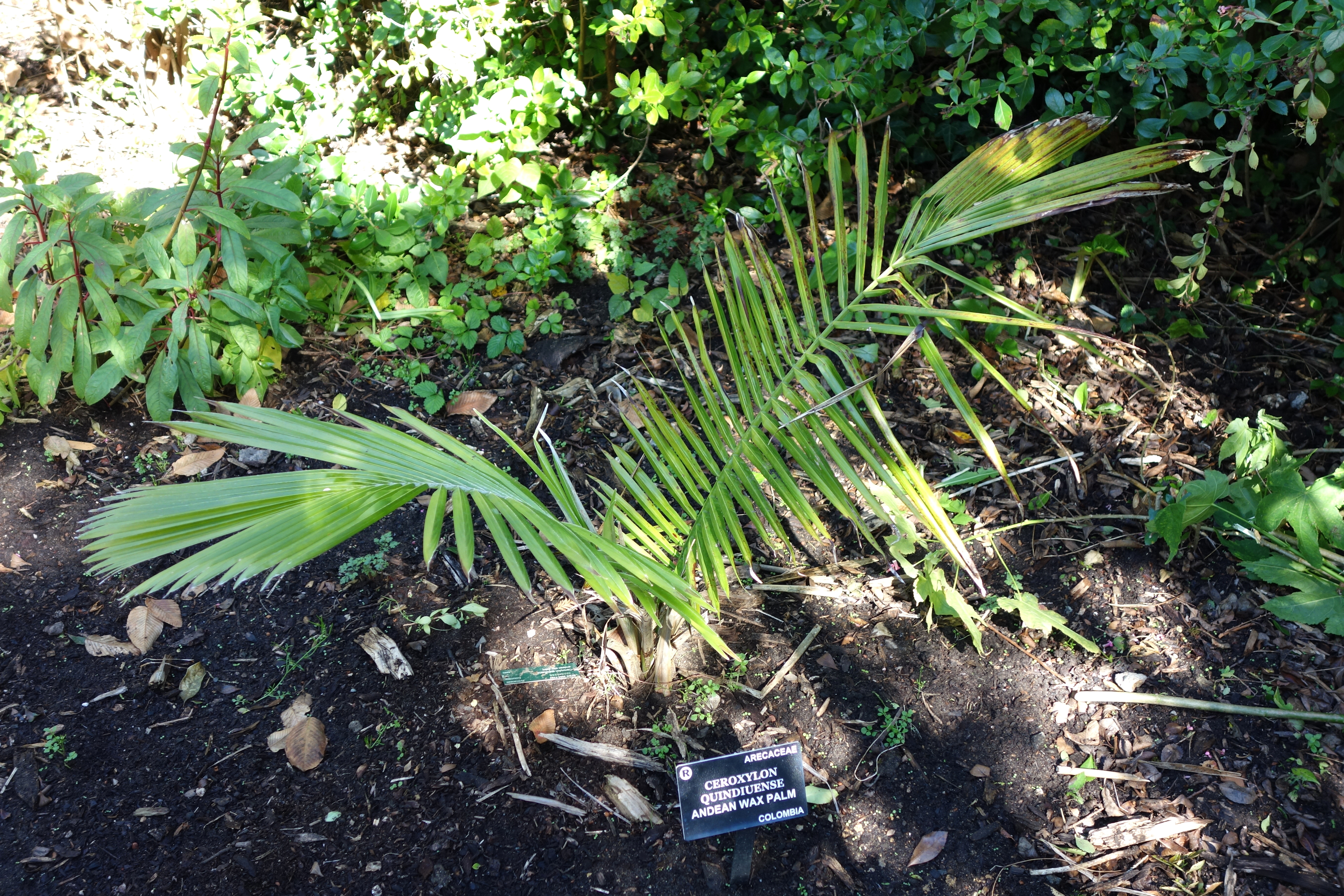

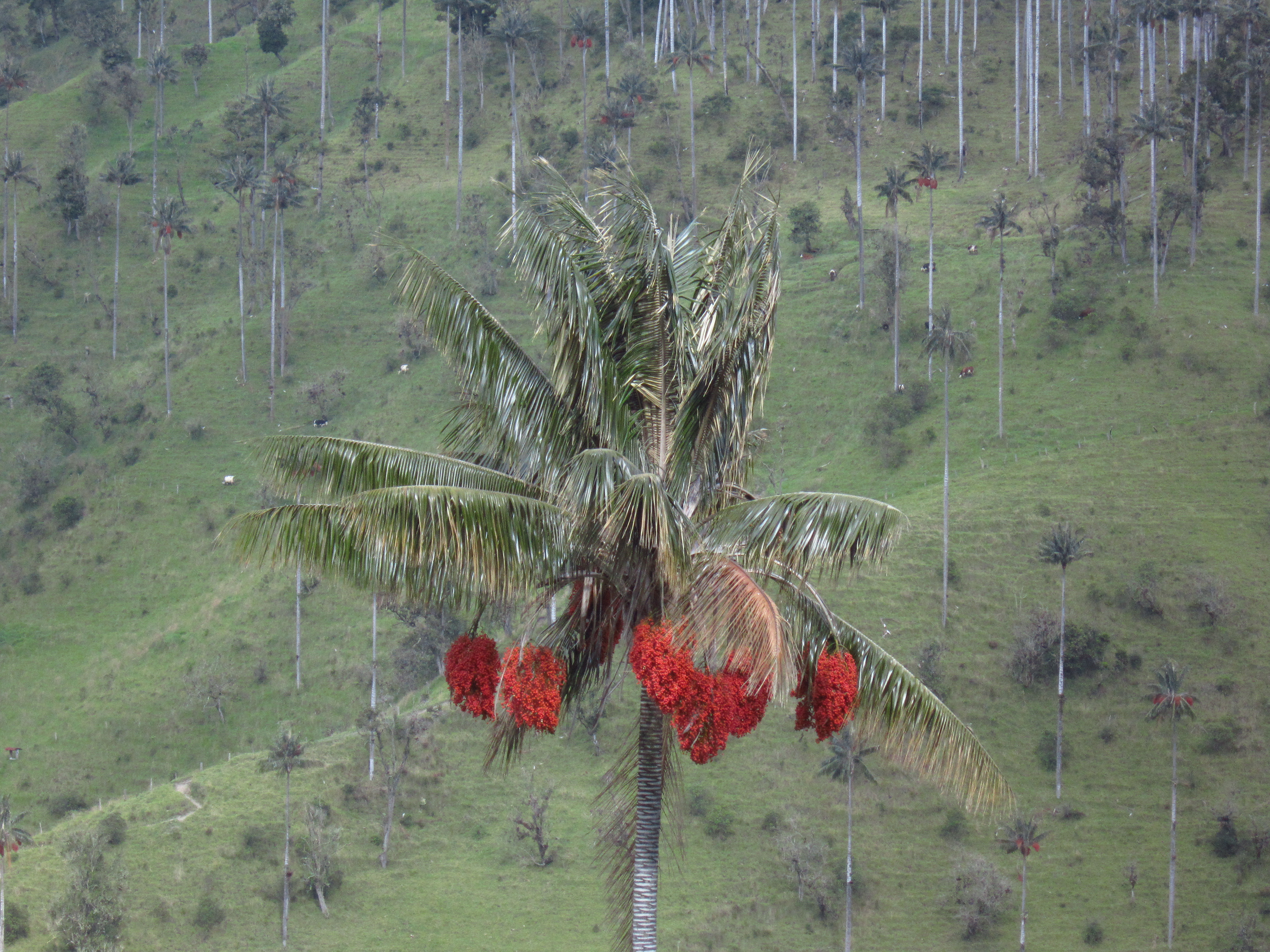

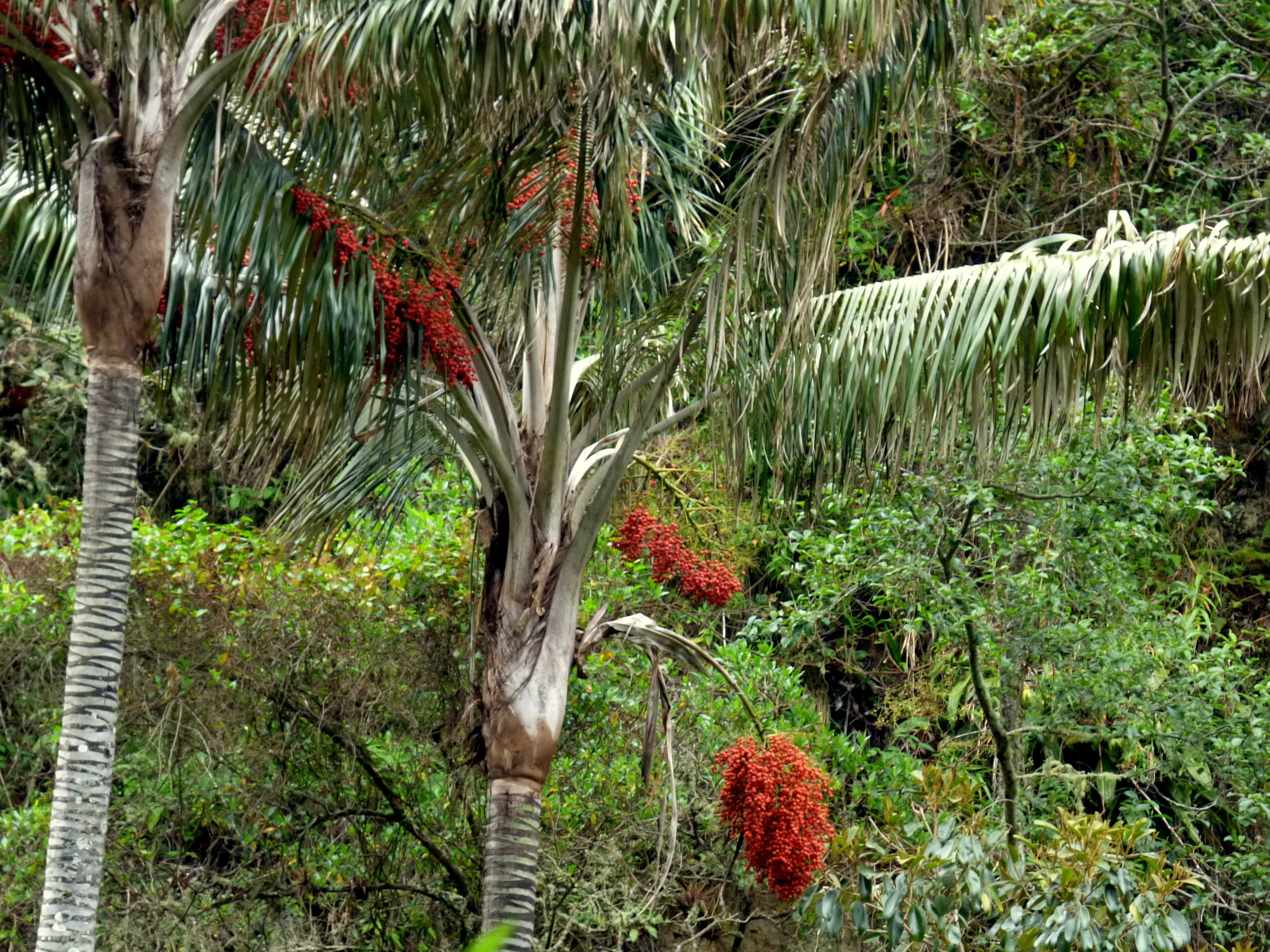

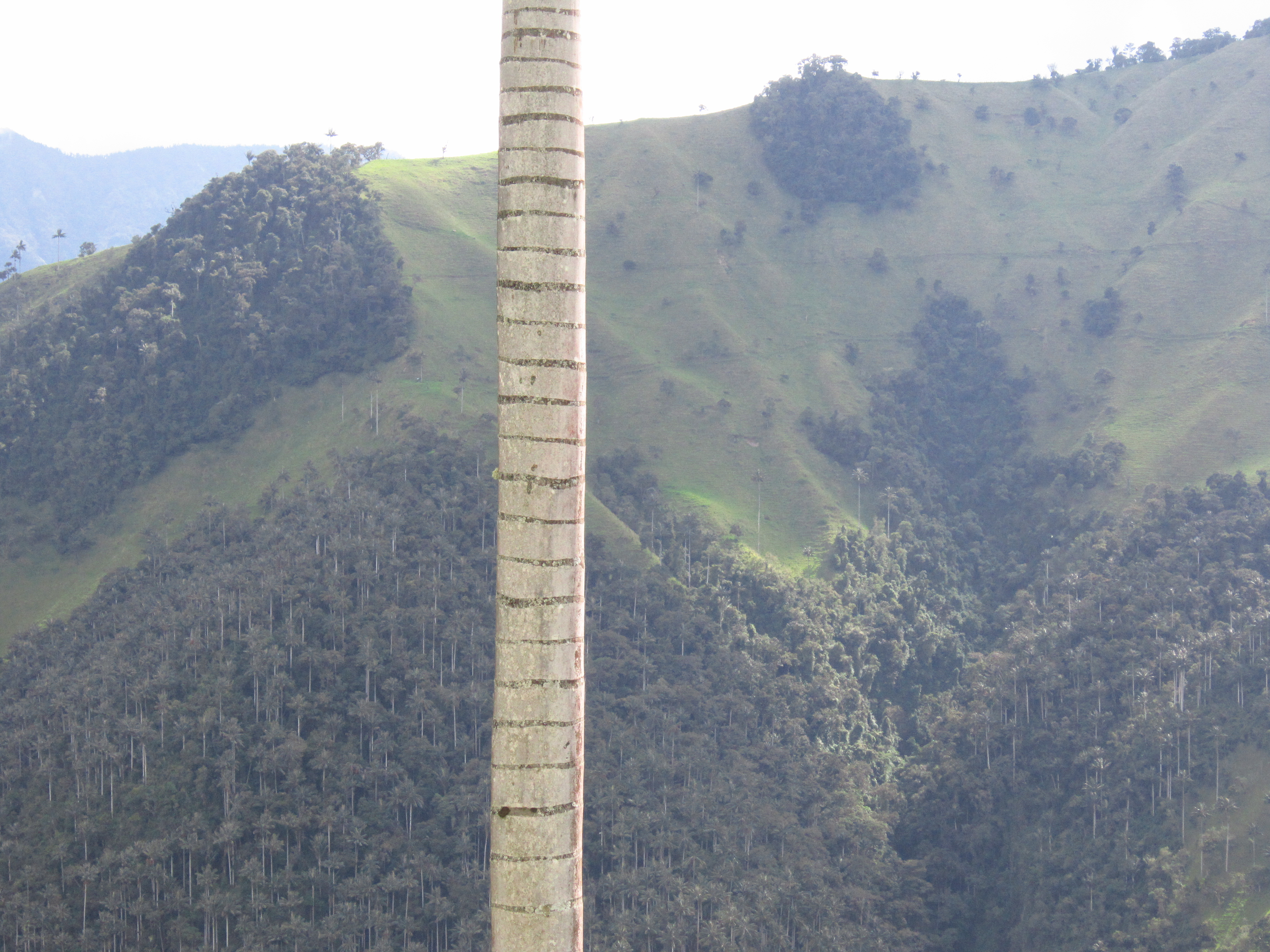

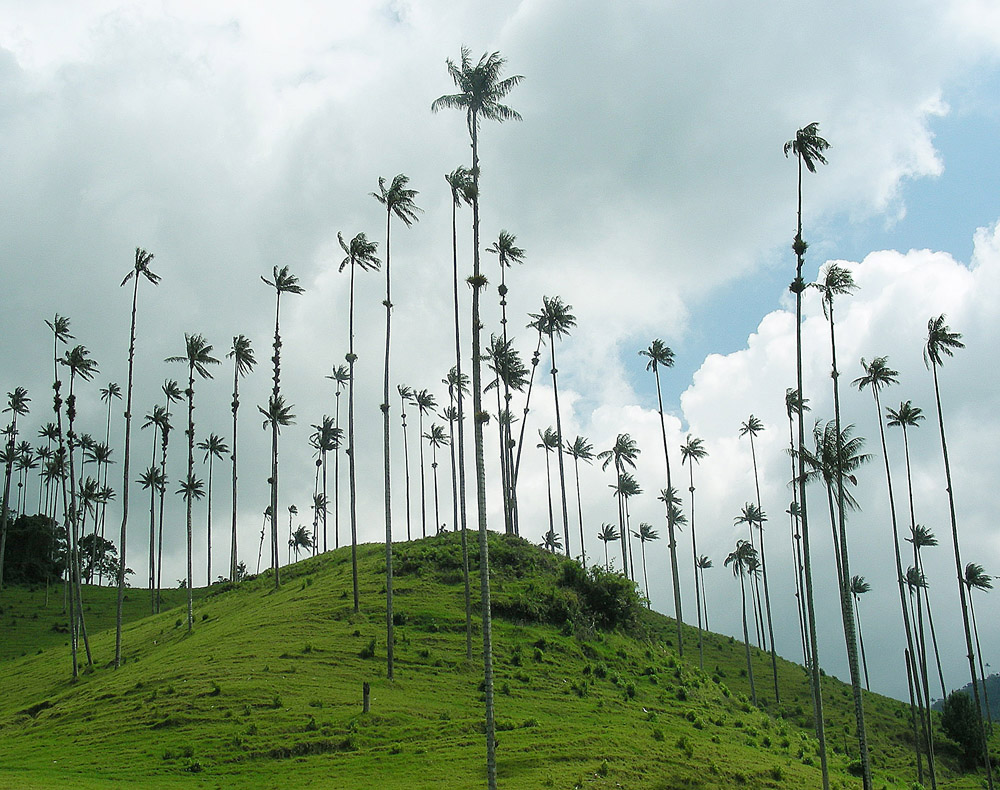

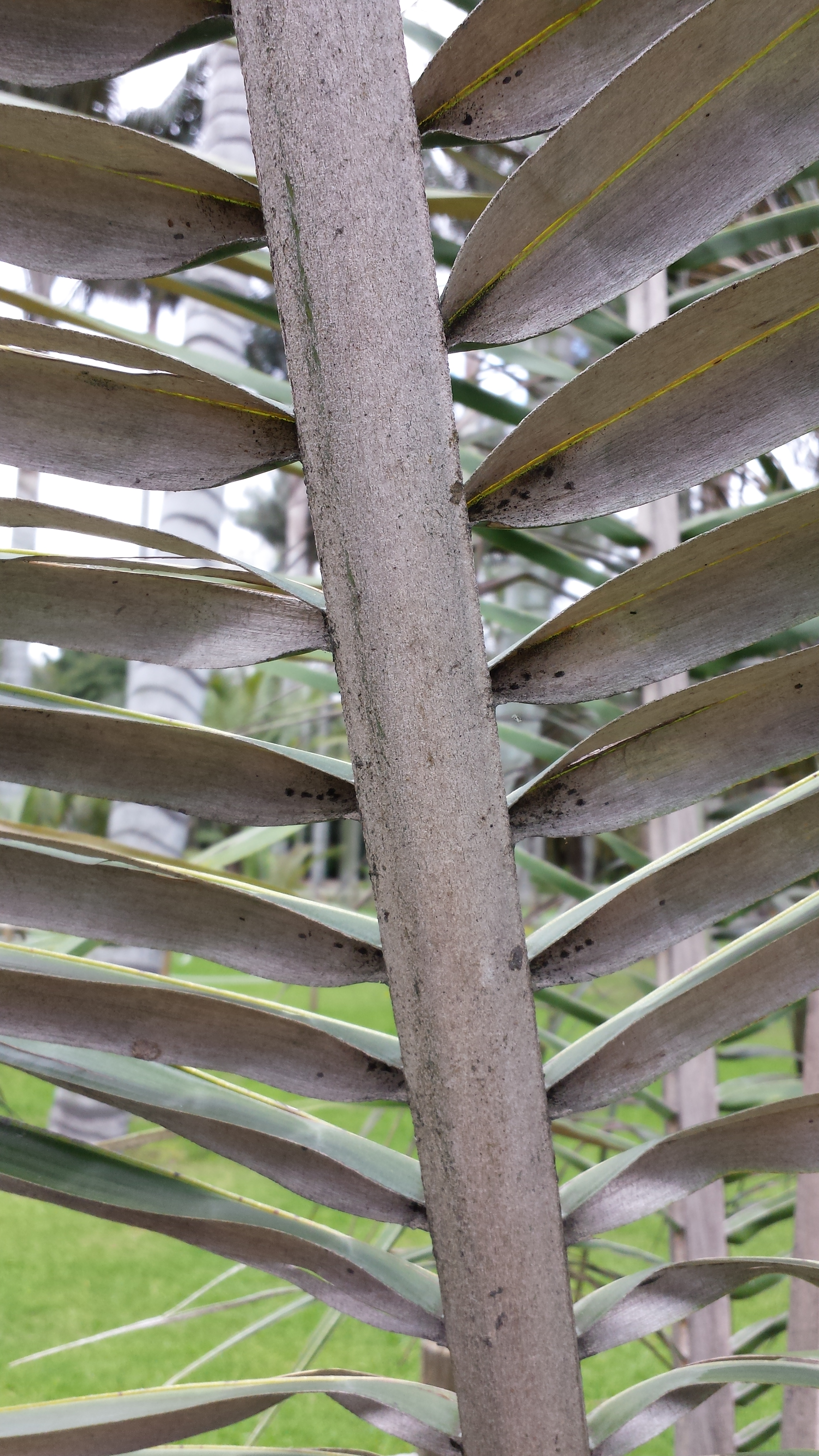
