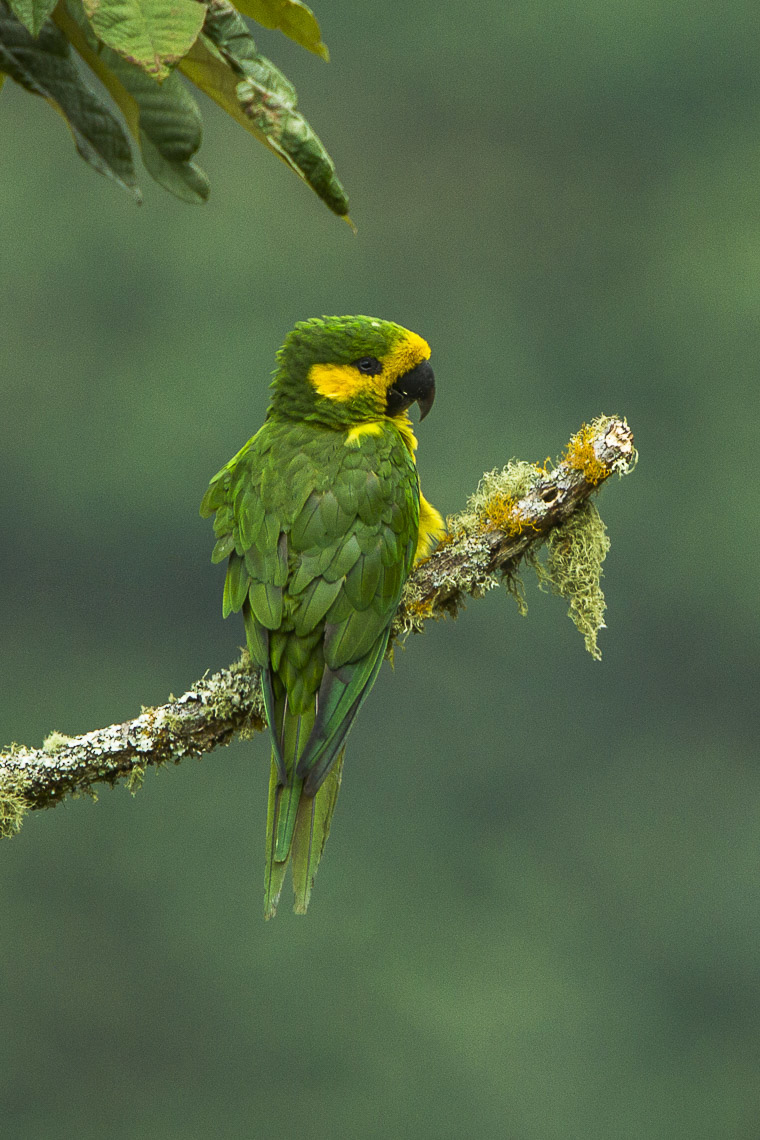
- In Colombia

Conservation status
- Vulnerable (IUCN 3.1)
- CITES Appendix I

Scientific classification
- Kingdom: Animalia
- Phylum: Chordata
- Class: Aves
- Order: Psittaciformes
- Family: Psittacidae
- Tribe: Arini
- Genus: Ognorhynchus; Bonaparte, 1857
- Species: O. icterotis

Binomial name
- Ognorhynchus icterotis (Massena & Souancé, 1854)

= Yellow-eared parrot =

Species of bird

The yellow-eared parrot (Ognorhynchus icterotis) is a vulnerable parrot found in the Andes of Colombia. It was thought to be extinct up until April 1999, when a group of researchers that were sponsored by ABC and Fundación Loro Parque, discovered a total of 81 individuals in the Colombian Andes. It is currently enlisted as vulnerable on the International Union for Conservation of Nature (IUCN) Red List. Its current population trend is increasing, in part due to conservation measures implemented to protect the existing populations of the species. It is closely associated with the wax palm (Ceroxylon sp.).

== Description ==
The yellow-eared parrot is a relatively large, long-tailed parrot, with an average length of 42 cm (17 in) and a weight of about 285 g (10.1 oz). It is overall green, with the underparts being paler, more lime green than the upperparts. The heavy beak and a ring of bare skin around the eyes are black. The origin of the common epithet "yellow-eared" derives from the yellow patch of feathers that extends from the forehead down to its cheeks and ear-coverts. Its calls sound similar to those of geese.

== Distribution and habitat ==
The yellow-eared parrot nests and lives among wax palms in a few areas of Western and Central cordilleras of Colombia, which are northern sub-ranges of the Andes, where it inhabits cloud forests about 1800–3000 meters above sea level. It nests in the hollow trunks of the palms, usually 25–30 meters over the floor level. It also occurred very locally in northern Ecuador. Its numbers have been greatly reduced, and only 81 individuals were recorded in the Colombian census of 1999. Their populations have been impacted by hunting and habitat destruction, particularly the harvesting of wax palm, which was traditionally cut down and used each year on Palm Sunday. There has been no confirmed record of this parrot from Ecuador since the mid-1990s. The number of mature individuals in the population is 212, though it is thought that there is a total of 1,408 individuals in the wild.

It is also found in Riosucio, Caldas in Colombia.

Panorama of the Cocora valley with wax palms

== Ecology ==
=== Diet ===
Yellow-eared parrots rely on the wax palm for much of their life cycle. One of their principle foods is the wax palm fruit, although they will eat other fruits and seeds as well, plus bark, buds and ferns. They nest in these trees because of their hollow trunks, which is about 30 meters above the forest floor, making their habitat in the cloud forests and elfin forests of Colombia.

=== Breeding ===
Yellow-eared parrots tend to be social birds who gather in flocks of about one to two dozen at times. Several of these parrots tend to cooperate in rearing chicks which increases their chances of survival. These birds can have up to two broods of young per year.

== Conservation threats to habitat ==
The yellow-eared parrot has suffered greatly from habitat fragmentation and habitat loss. Specifically, over 90-93% of montane forests in Colombia have been cleared for agricultural use or settlement. Sizable areas of its historical habitat remain, which adds to its decline, as the current habitat is what is suffering the most. The Quindio wax palm (Ceroxylon quindiuense), is a species of palm that is native to the humid montane forests of the Andes in Colombia. The yellow-eared parrot depends greatly on the Quindio wax palm for roosting, nesting, and feeding on its fruits, where it nests usually 25–30 meters over the floor level in the trunk. This palm species has become highly threatened due to the use of its fronds to adorn Palm Sunday processions. Some other threats include residential and commercial development such as housing and urban areas, as well as logging and wood harvesting.

== Use and trade ==
The yellow-eared parrot is hunted for food at the local and national level. At the international level, the use of these parrots as pets or as display animals has contributed to this species decline. The parrot had previously been hunted for food, especially in Ecuador, which is why there are so few to none of these individuals found in Ecuador today.

== Conservation actions in place ==
From 1998, Fundación ProAves with the support of Fundacion Loro Parque, American Bird Conservancy, CORANTIOQUIA, and local environmentalists like Gonzalo Cardona Molina have undertaken an intensive conservation project across Colombia that has led to one of Latin America's most successful recoveries of an endangered bird. As a result of the initial finding of this small population, Fundación ProAves Yellow-eared Parrot Bird Reserve has been founded to focus on recovering this species, along with the wax palm. Currently in Colombia, there are awareness raising events to reduce hunting pressure and the impact of Palm Sunday processions which involve poster campaigns, environmental education, community workshops, school visits, and radio.

A publicity campaign, which included television and radio appeals, music concerts and a touring 'Parrot Bus' made for a huge increase in awareness of the problems facing the parrot and its habitat throughout Colombia. This campaign grew into an alliance of over 35 national NGOs, government departments, and the Episcopal Conference of Colombia. Through the endorsement by the Catholic Church, an end was brought to the use of wax palm fronds for Palm Sunday across a large part of the country of Colombia, and sustainable alternatives were promoted instead.

A significant increase in the population can be attributed to the implementation of fencing and breeding sites to allow wax palm regeneration and habitat restoration and provision of artificial nest boxes. The Fundación ProAves owns two reserves where conservation efforts are focused on this species, one near Jardín and the other in Roncesvalles-Tolima. In 2009, ProAves, the Loro Parque Fundación, the American Bird Conservancy and others established a corridor of over 16,000 acres (including the acquisition of over 10,000 acres) for the Yellow-eared Parrot and other threatened parrots across the Central Cordillera in Colombia. Artificial nests have also been implemented in San Luis de Cubarral in 2011. With protection and community support, the yellow-eared parrot population has climbed to over 1500 individuals by 2012, with one of the most successful recovery projects for an endangered bird. In the future, searching for additional populations will become very important, especially for possible populations in Ecuador. There has also been talk of purchasing and protecting further habitats in these regions, along with making wax palm nurseries in order to replant those that were destroyed.

In 2021, Sara Inés Lara, executive director of Fundación ProAves and Women for Conservation, spoke at L'Oréal - UNESCO For Women in Science festival about the conservation of Yellow-eared Parrots. At this event forty women researchers shared their inspiring stories about how they are changing the world through their loves for science and the environment. Sara Inés Lara spoke about the impactful work ProAves has done in order to take the 81 individual Yellow-eared Parrots that remained in 1999 to over 3,000 individuals that remain today. ProAves partnered with Women for Conservation not only to protect the Yellow-eared Parrot through maternal action, but also to provide sustainable livelihoods to women in Colombia. Women for Conservation establish women community networks around the 28 Fundación ProAves reserves through entrepreneur workshops, environmental education, family planning programs, and training as reserve rangers.

== Conservation research needed ==
The conservation actions that are still needed is continued resource and habitat protection. This would include buying and protecting further habitat. Also, the continuation of species recovery by continuing the current highly successful programme of conservation activities in Colombia, along with extending these activities to Ecuador to any sub populations that are identified within Ecuador in the future.

The research that is still needed includes population, size, distribution, and trends. This means that search for additional populations is needed, with a focus on determining status within the Intag Valley in Ecuador, and prepare habitat maps of the Volcán Ruiz-Tolima massif, which is a group of five ice-capped volcanoes which includes the Tolima, Santa Isabel, Quindio and Machin volcanoes.
