= Epicrionops marmoratus =

Conservation status
- Data Deficient (IUCN 3.1)

Scientific classification
- Kingdom: Animalia
- Phylum: Chordata
- Class: Amphibia
- Order: Gymnophiona
- Clade: Apoda
- Family: Rhinatrematidae
- Genus: Epicrionops
- Species: E. marmoratus

Binomial name
- Epicrionops marmoratus Taylor, 1968

Synonyms
- Rhinatrema marmoratum (Taylor, 1968)

Species of amphibian

Epicrionops marmoratus, the marbled caecilian, is a species of caecilian in the family Rhinatrematidae. It is endemic to Ecuador and only known from its type locality, Santo Domingo de los Colorados, and from near Mindo in the Pichincha Province in north-western Ecuador. It is a poorly known species that might be a junior synonym of Epicrionops bicolor.

== Description ==
Epicrionops marmoratus is a small but robust-bodied caecilian. Based on two specimens of unspecific sex, adults measure 278–299 mm (10.9–11.8 in) in snout–vent length. The tail is relatively long at 22 mm (0.9 in). The coloration is whitish cream with lavender spots and spots, which are coarser in the mid-ventral region and lighter on the back, while the lower parts of the sides are less pigmented. It differs from Epicrionops bicolor and E. petersi mostly by coloration (yellow and brown in the former and uniform black to brown in the latter).

== Habitat and conservation ==
Epicrionops marmoratus is associated with montane forests at about of 1,500 m (4,900 ft) above sea level, although the type locality is also cited as being at about 670 m (2,200 ft). The eggs are presumably laid on land while the larvae are believed to develop in streams. Threats to this species are unknown, but could involve habitat loss caused by livestock rearing, agricultural activities, and water pollution. It is protected by the Mindo-Nambillo Protected Forest.
