= Luis Vidales =

Colombian poet and writer (1904–1990)

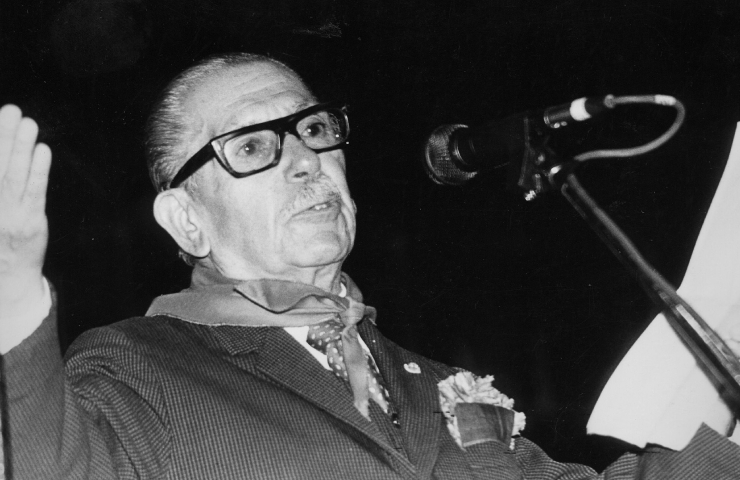
Luis Vidales

Luis Vidales (26 July 1904 – 14 June 1990) was a Colombian poet, writer, statistician and politician. Born in Calarcá, Quindío, Colombia. In Bogotá, he was a founding member of the literary group Los Nuevos, where he participated in various literary and political gatherings with Luis Tejada, Ricardo Rendon, León de Greiff, José Mar and others.

== Biography ==
From 1930 Vidales began militancy in the Colombian Communist Party, holding the role of general secretary between 1932 and 1934. He worked regularly in newspapers such as El Espectador and El Tiempo.

In 1932 he assumed the post of editor-in-chief of the daily Tierra, an official organ of the Communist Party, under the leadership of Guillermo Rodríguez Hernández. As an editor, Vidales waged a vigorous campaign against the Colombian-Peruvian War, calling on soldiers from both nations to fraternize at the front and 'turn their weapons against their own officers.

After the assassination of Jorge Eliécer Gaitán in 1948, Luis Vidales and his family were subject to persecution by the right-wing regime and went into exile in Chile. They returned to Colombia in 1958 with the invitation of president Alberto Lleras Camargo. Vidales then took over the management of the National Administrative Department of Statistics.

After leaving the civil service in 1978, he again returned to the political struggle as an activist of the Communist Party. In 1979, during the reign of Julio Cesar Turbay Ayala, military units raided his residence, illegally detaining the poet and his wife under the pretext of obtaining a warrant for the arrest of another person and searching for weapons from the M-19 guerrilla group. This caused outrage in national and international public opinion; among the signatories of the protest notes was the French philosopher Jean-Paul Sartre.

However, he initially refused to come out of prison and demanded that the workers detained with him also be released, and therefore went on a hunger strike.

In 1982 he won the National Poetry Prize and in 1985 the Lenin Peace Prize.

== Selected works ==
=== Poetry ===
- Suenan timbres (1926).
- La Obreriada (1978).
- Poemas del abominable hombre del Barrio Las Nieves (1985).
- Antología poética (1985).
- El libro de los fantasmas (1986).
- Cuadrito en movimiento (1987)

=== Essays ===
- Tratado de estética (1945).
- La insurrección desplomada (1948).
- La circunstancia social en el arte (1973).
