= Ancízar López López =

Colombian politician

Senator of Colombia
- In office 1970–1991

President of the Senate of Colombia
- In office July 20, 1987 – July 20, 1989
- Preceded by: Humberto Peláez
- Succeeded by: Luis Guillermo Giraldo

1st Governor of Quindío
- In office June 1, 1966 – March 14, 1969
- Preceded by: Position established
- Succeeded by: Jorge Arango Mejía

Member of the Chamber of Representatives of Colombia
- In office 1960–1966
- Constituency: Caldas

Personal details
- Born: May 25, 1926 Montenegro, Quindío, Colombia
- Died: Unknown Colombian Jungle
- Party: Liberal
- Spouse: Cornelia Botero Mejia
- Children: Claudia Constanza, Maria Fernanda, Maria Teresa, Manuel, and Cesar Augusto López Botero

Ancízar López López was a Colombian politician, born in Quindio. He was a representative, and as senator he developed the project for the creation of the Quindio Department, becoming its first governor when created.

According to police reports, on April 11, 2002, he was kidnapped by the National Liberation Army (ELN). For several months there was no news about his condition, but it was learned that he eventually died in an unknown location, probably due to complications of an unattended kidney failure. His body was finally turned over to the Red Cross.

The national government declared two days of grief. An avenue and a cenotaph were built in the city of Armenia in his honor.

== See also ==
- List of kidnappings
- List of solved missing person cases (2000s)
