= Epicrionops peruvianus =

Conservation status
- Data Deficient (IUCN 3.1)

Scientific classification
- Kingdom: Animalia
- Phylum: Chordata
- Class: Amphibia
- Order: Gymnophiona
- Clade: Apoda
- Family: Rhinatrematidae
- Genus: Epicrionops
- Species: E. peruvianus

Binomial name
- Epicrionops peruvianus (Boulenger, 1902)

Synonyms
- Rhinatrema peruvianum Boulenger, 1902

Species of amphibian

Epicrionops peruvianus, the Marcapata Valley caecilian, is a species of caecilian in the family Rhinatrematidae endemic to Peru. Its natural habitats are subtropical or tropical moist montane forests, rivers, and intermittent rivers.

== Characteristics ==
E. peruvianus is a larger Rhinatemid attaining a length of around 280 millimeters (11.02 in), with a greatest body diameter of 12 mm (.47 in).

It is noted to have a more obtuse tail and more numerous annuli on the body than E. bicolor. It is further distinguished in having no yellow lateral band across the body.

Colors in this species are a uniform dark brown, with the anal region being whitish in coloration
