= E. niger =

E. niger may refer to:

- Epicrionops niger, a caecilian amphibian species found in Guyana, Venezuela and possibly Brazil
- Esox niger, the chain pickerel, a freshwater fish species found along the eastern coast of North America

== See also ==
- Niger (disambiguation)
