= Génova, Quindío =

Coordinates: 4°15′N 75°40′W

- Municipality and town
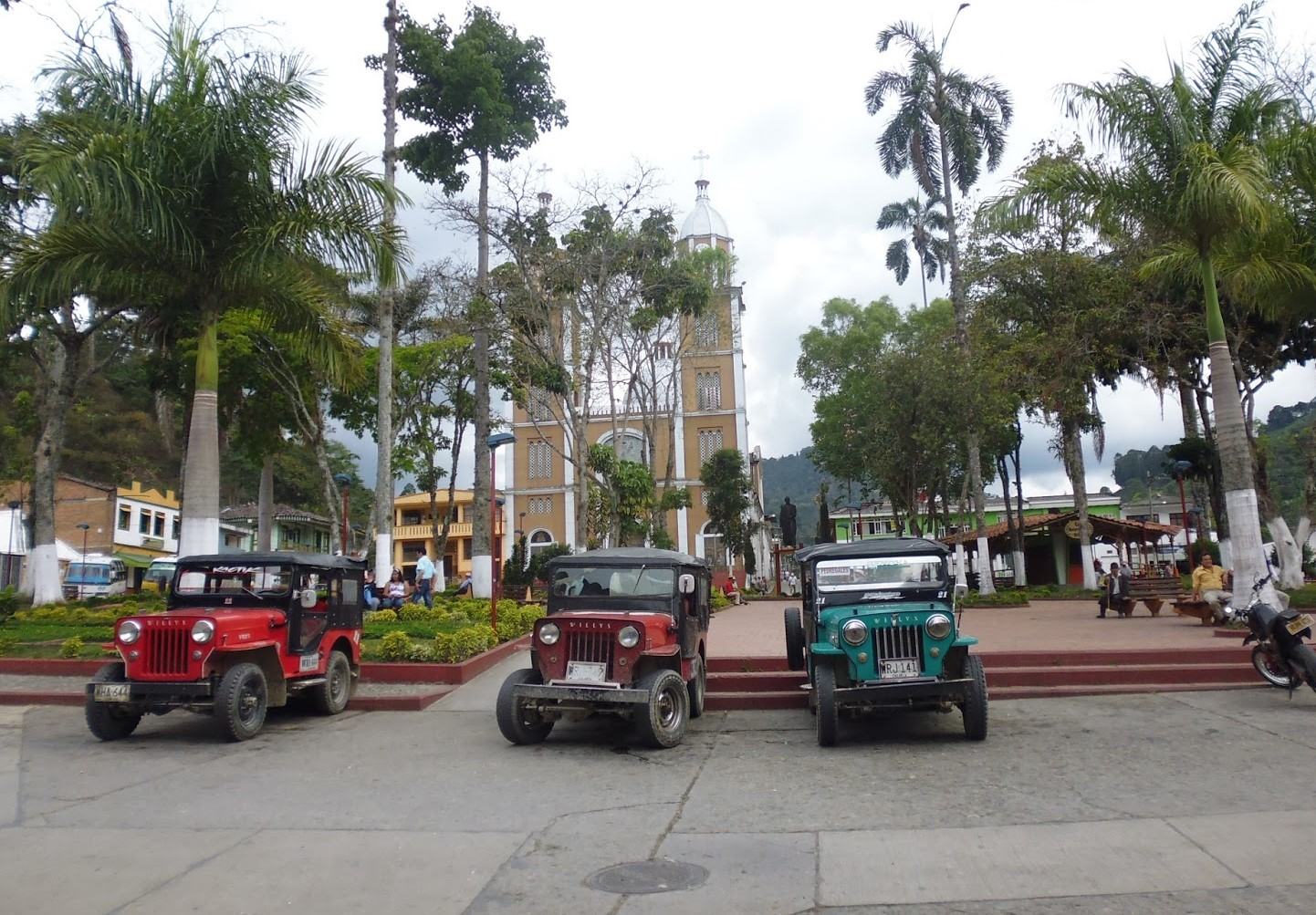
- Génova Main Square

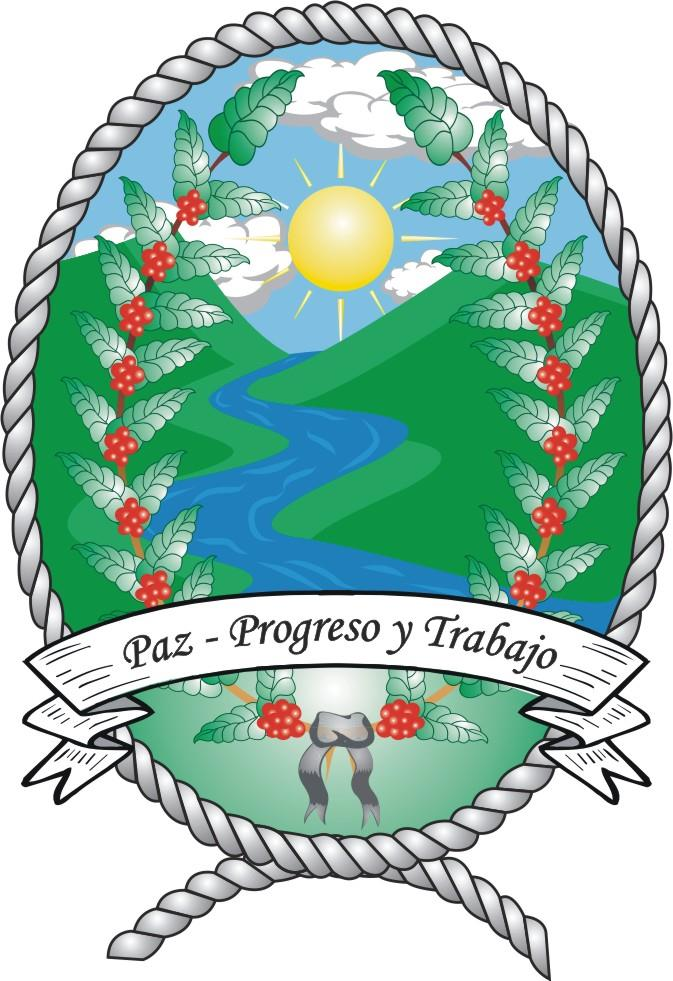
- Flag Coat of arms

- Location of the municipality and town of Génova, Quindío in the Quindío Department of Colombia.
- Country: Colombia
- Department: Quindío Department

Area
  - Total: 297.9 km^{2} (115.0 sq mi)
- Elevation: 1,450 m (4,760 ft)

Population (2023)
  - Total: 7,726
- Time zone: UTC-5 (Colombia Standard Time)

Génova (Spanish pronunciation: [ˈxenoβa]) is a municipality in the southern part of the department of Quindío, Colombia. It's located 52 km south of the departmental capital Armenia.

Located within the Colombian coffee growing axis, the municipality was made part of the "Coffee Cultural Landscape" UNESCO World Heritage Site in 2011. In 2023 Génova had an estimated population of 7,726.

== History ==
Génova was founded by Segundo Henao Patiño, who had founded Calarcá in 1886. During the Thousand Day War, Henao was told by mule drivers arriving from Antioquia and Tolima that the government war ministry was executing liberal guerrillas, with or without trial. In order to hide from these potential reprisals, he organized a group of liberals from Calarcá to explore the mountains to the south.

The expedition, headed by Henao, included the families Patiño, Ossa, Ospina, Restrepo, Aria, Herrera, Aguilar, Cardona, González, Orozco and Giraldo. The group planted out land along the Gris and Azul rivers. There were already several settlers living in the region, near the Gris River.

Henao was well known throughout the region for his role in the foundation of Calarcá, and all of the settlers enthusiastically supported him when he announced his intention to form a new town. He was placed in charge of choosing a site and designing the street plans. Henao chose a site near the joining of the Gris and San Juan rivers, on the land of Luis Ossa.

The official foundation took place on October 12, 1903. Génova became a corregimiento of Calarcá in 1906, and was later included in the municipality of Pijao when this was created in 1927. In 1937 the town became a separate municipality, with Fución Londoño the first mayor.

== Climate ==
Génova has a subtropical highland climate with an average of 21°C.

== Notable people ==
- Luis Garavito (born 1957), prolific serial killer
- Manuel Marulanda (c.1930-2008), FARC-EP leader
