= Buenavista, Quindío =

Buenavista
- Municipality and town
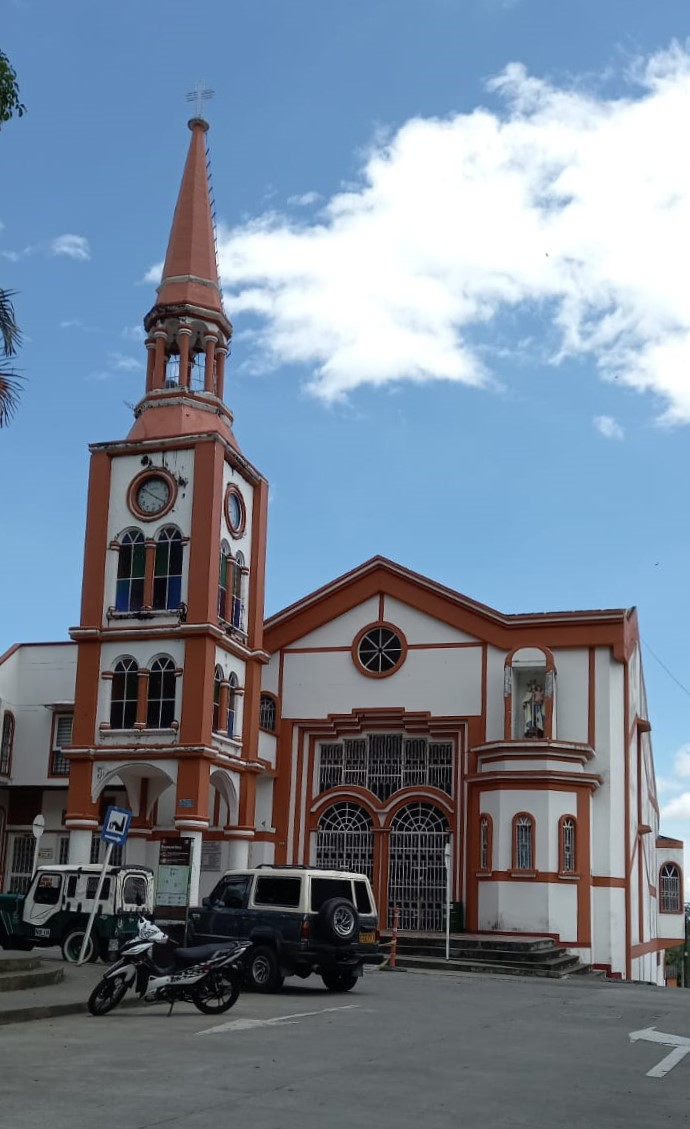
- Our Lady of Carmen Parish in the main park

- Flag Coat of arms

- Location of the municipality and town of Buenavista in the Quindío Department of Colombia
- Coordinates: 4°21′35″N 75°44′21″W
- Country: Colombia
- Department: Quindío Department
- Elevation: 1,483 m (4,865 ft)

Population (2023)
  - Total: 3,220
- Time zone: UTC-5 (Colombia Standard Time)

Buenavista is a municipality in the south-central part of the department of Quindío, Colombia. Its known and named for the spectacular view over the department. The township is located 33 kilometres (21 mi) south of the departmental capital Armenia.

In 2023 the town had an estimated population of 3,220 being the municipality with the least population of Quindío.

== Geography ==
Buenavista is situated in the western slopes on the central Cordillera and is characterized by its steep terrain. It is bounded to the north and west by Calarcá, to the east by Córdoba with the Verde River forming the limit, and to the south by Pijao. It has an area of 41 km^{2}, the smallest municipality in the department.

=== Climate ===
The average temperature of Buenavista is 20 °C with a subtropical highland climate.

The urban area is located at 4°32′N 75°41′W, at an altitude of 1,483 metres, with an area of 14 hectares.

Climate data for Buenavista (Paraguaycito), elevation 1,250 m (4,100 ft), (1971–2000)
Month	Jan	Feb	Mar	Apr	May	Jun	Jul	Aug	Sep	Oct	Nov	Dec	Year
Mean daily maximum °C (°F)	28.5 (83.3)	28.6 (83.5)	28.7 (83.7)	28.1 (82.6)	27.7 (81.9)	27.9 (82.2)	28.6 (83.5)	28.7 (83.7)	28.3 (82.9)	27.4 (81.3)	27.4 (81.3)	27.8 (82.0)	28.1 (82.6)
Daily mean °C (°F)	21.8 (71.2)	22.0 (71.6)	22.1 (71.8)	21.9 (71.4)	21.7 (71.1)	21.9 (71.4)	22.2 (72.0)	22.2 (72.0)	21.7 (71.1)	21.1 (70.0)	21.2 (70.2)	21.4 (70.5)	21.8 (71.2)
Mean daily minimum °C (°F)	16.6 (61.9)	16.8 (62.2)	17.2 (63.0)	17.5 (63.5)	17.4 (63.3)	17.3 (63.1)	16.6 (61.9)	16.7 (62.1)	16.7 (62.1)	16.9 (62.4)	17.0 (62.6)	16.8 (62.2)	16.9 (62.4)
Average precipitation mm (inches)	156.8 (6.17)	138.0 (5.43)	218.9 (8.62)	254.2 (10.01)	206.7 (8.14)	95.7 (3.77)	71.9 (2.83)	97.6 (3.84)	168.7 (6.64)	283.7 (11.17)	291.3 (11.47)	172.9 (6.81)	2,156.4 (84.90)
Average precipitation days	14	14	17	20	20	15	10	12	17	22	21	16	200
Average relative humidity (%)	77	76	77	79	80	79	74	74	77	80	80	79	78
Mean monthly sunshine hours	179.8	144.2	139.5	126.0	124.0	138.0	167.4	158.1	135.0	127.1	132.0	158.1	1,729.2
Mean daily sunshine hours	5.8	5.1	4.5	4.2	4.0	4.6	5.4	5.1	4.5	4.1	4.4	5.1	4.7
Source: Instituto de Hidrologia Meteorologia y Estudios Ambientales

== History ==
Among the first settlers in the region was José Jesús Jiménez Yépez in 1928, who opened a store to buy coffee from the surrounding fincas and to sell basic supplies. The nearby farmers bought lots of land in the area around the store and constructed their homes there, forming a small settlement. Gerardo Loaiza donated the land to form the principal park.

The official foundation date is considered to be 1933. In that year a police inspector was assigned to the settlement. Jiménez donated land for further development, including the site on which the church was constructed.

In 1936 the settlement was elevated to the level of a town (corregimiento) in the municipality of Pijao. On December 10, 1966, shortly after the formation of the department of Quindío, the municipality was separated from Pijao.
