= Flag of Quindío Department =

Quindío
- Proportion: 2:3
- Design: A vertical tricolour of green, yellow, and purple

The Flag of the Department of Quindío, Colombia, is a tricolour featuring three vertical bands of green, yellow, and purple. It was designed by Solita Lozano de Goméz, who also designed the Coat of arms of the Department of Quindío.

== Symbolism ==
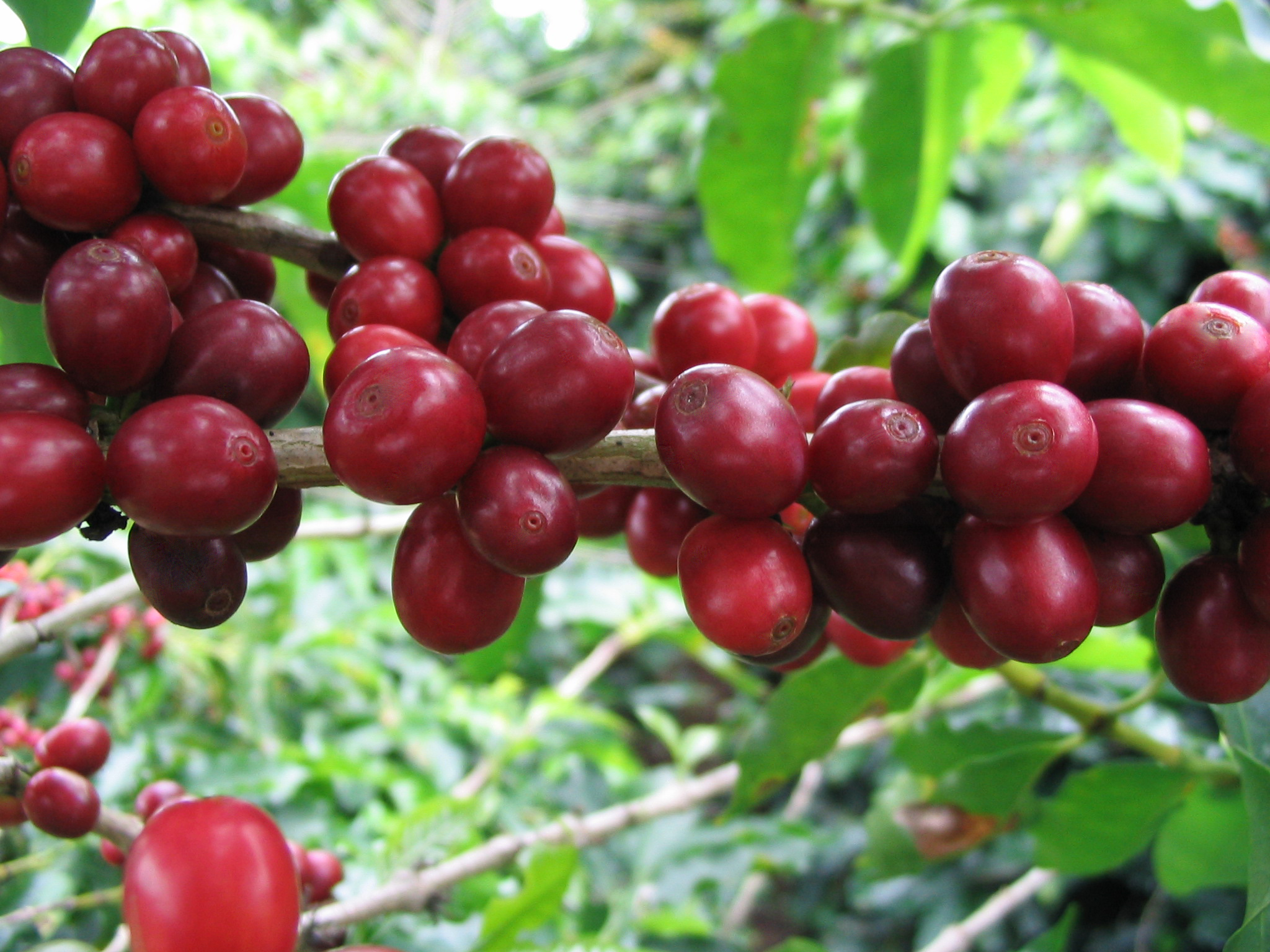
Ripe coffee beans

The green band on the far left of the flag symbolizes the department's natural vegetation and agricultural activities. The yellow band in the middle symbolize the department's contribution to the economy of Colombia. And the purple band on the right of the flag is an expression of maturity. Purple is the color of the coffee bean when it is ready to be picked, coffee being the department's most important product.
