= Amazops =

Scientific classification
- Kingdom: Animalia
- Phylum: Chordata
- Class: Amphibia
- Order: Gymnophiona
- Clade: Apoda
- Family: Rhinatrematidae
- Genus: Amazops; Wilkinson, Reynolds & Jacobs, 2021
- Species: A. amazops

Binomial name
- Amazops amazops Wilkinson, Reynolds & Jacobs, 2021

Genus of amphibians

Amazops is a monotypic genus of caecilian in the family Rhinatrematidae. It contains only one species, Amazops amazops. It is endemic to Ecuador and is only known from a single specimen collected around 1990 from the Virgen La Dolores Farm in the province of Orellana. The individual was found in very soft, red and muddy soil under some rocks on a dirt road in a portion of the Ecuadorian Amazon at an altitude of about 1000 meters above sea level. It is presumed that like most other rhinatrematids, it is oviparous and is aquatic during its larval phase.

It is the first new species of rhinatrematid caecilian from the Andes described after more than 50 years, and can be distinguished from other members of the family by its elongated squamous bone that is a part of the eye's orbit and occupies anterior parts of the skull, parts that are normally occupied by the maxilla and palatine in other rhinatrematids. It shares these anatomical traits with other non-rhinatrematid caecilians, indicating that these are likely either a convergent or ancestral trait for Gymnophiona; if the latter, Amazops would be the most basal species of rhinatrematid caecilian, and likely of caecilians in general. Due to the only known specimen being over 30 years old at the time of description and the lack of research into rhinatrematids of the area, it has been recommended that the species be classified as data deficient by the IUCN Red List.
