= Rhinatrema bivittatum =

Conservation status
- Least Concern (IUCN 3.1)

Scientific classification
- Kingdom: Animalia
- Phylum: Chordata
- Class: Amphibia
- Order: Gymnophiona
- Clade: Apoda
- Family: Rhinatrematidae
- Genus: Rhinatrema
- Species: R. bivittatum

Binomial name
- Rhinatrema bivittatum (Guérin-Méneville, 1829)

Species of amphibian

Rhinatrema bivittatum, the two-lined caecilian, is a species of caecilian in the family Rhinatrematidae. It is found in Brazil, French Guiana, Guyana, and Suriname. Its natural habitats are subtropical or tropical moist lowland forests, rivers, and intermittent rivers.
