= Epicrionops parkeri =

Conservation status
- Vulnerable (IUCN 3.1)

Scientific classification
- Kingdom: Animalia
- Phylum: Chordata
- Class: Amphibia
- Order: Gymnophiona
- Clade: Apoda
- Family: Rhinatrematidae
- Genus: Epicrionops
- Species: E. parkeri

Binomial name
- Epicrionops parkeri (Dunn, 1942)

Species of amphibian

Epicrionops parkeri, or Parker's caecilian, is a species of caecilian in the family Rhinatrematidae endemic to Colombia. Its natural habitats are subtropical or tropical moist montane forests, rivers, and intermittent rivers.
