= Rhinatrema nigrum =

Conservation status
- Least Concern (IUCN 3.1)

Scientific classification
- Kingdom: Animalia
- Phylum: Chordata
- Class: Amphibia
- Order: Gymnophiona
- Clade: Apoda
- Family: Rhinatrematidae
- Genus: Rhinatrema
- Species: R. nigrum

Binomial name
- Rhinatrema nigrum Dunn, 1942

Synonyms
- Epicrionops niger(Dunn, 1942)

Species of amphibian

Rhinatrema nigrum, the black caecilian, is a species of caecilian in the family Rhinatrematidae found in Guyana, Venezuela, and possibly Brazil. Its natural habitats are subtropical or tropical moist lowland forests, subtropical or tropical moist montane forests, rivers, and intermittent rivers.

== Taxonomy ==
This species was first described by the American herpetologist Emmett Reid Dunn in 1942 as Rhinatrema nigrum, the type locality being Arundabara, British Guiana. It has been included in the genus Epicrionops as Epicrionops niger.

== Distribution and habitat ==
The black caecilian is native to south eastern Venezuela and western Guyana, and possibly northern Brazil. It occurs at altitudes of between 100 and 1,700 m (330 and 5,580 ft) in moist lowland and montane forests, cloud forests, seasonally dry forests, wetlands, marshes and the banks of temporary and permanent water courses. Only four specimens have been recorded, and it is likely that the range of this species is in reality wider than is currently known. Whether the species can adapt to secondary habitats is unknown.

== Ecology ==
As an amphibian, this caecilian is likely to feed on insects, earthworms and other small invertebrates. Clutches of eggs have been found under rocks, where they are guarded by the female. The larvae probably develop in streams.

== Status ==
The black caecilian has a wide distribution in an area with very little human disturbance, and is known to be present in Canaima National Park in Venezuela. Although the total population size is unknown, the species is believed to be common with few known threats, and the International Union for Conservation of Nature has assessed its conservation status as being of "least concern".
