= Rhinatrema =

Scientific classification
- Kingdom: Animalia
- Phylum: Chordata
- Class: Amphibia
- Order: Gymnophiona
- Clade: Apoda
- Family: Rhinatrematidae
- Genus: Rhinatrema; Duméril and Bibron, 1841

Type species
- Caecilia bivittata Guérin-Méneville, 1838

Genus of amphibians

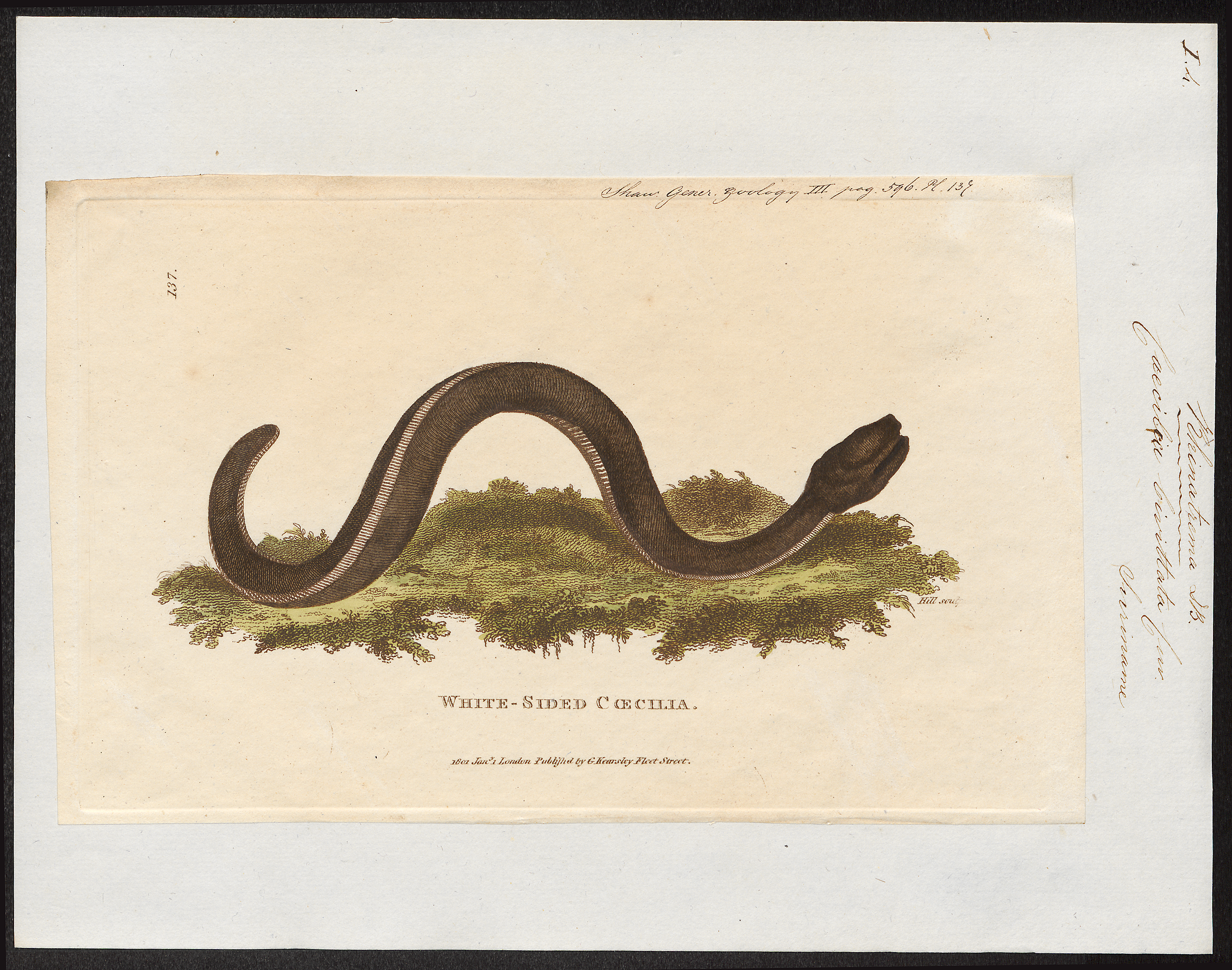
Illustration of the Caecilia bivittata

Rhinatrema is a genus of caecilians in the family Rhinatrematidae. Their common name is two-lined caecilians. The genus is known from the Guyanas (Guyana, French Guiana, and Suriname) and adjacent Brazil. Most Rhinatrema are known to inhabit and live in areas of tropical forests where there is an abundance of dense, dead vegetation matter.

Rhinatrema are primitive caecilians that have a true tail. They are oviparous.

Until recently, the two-lined caecilian (R. bivittatum) was the only species in the genus Rhinatrema. However, in 2010 and 2018, new species were described. The genus now contains now seven species:

Binomial name and author	Distribution	Status
Rhinatrema bivittatum (Guérin-Méneville, 1838)	Guyana, Surinam, French Guiana, Brazil	Least Concern
Rhinatrema gilbertogili Maciel, Sampaio, Hoogmoed, and Schneider, 2018	Brazil	Not evaluated
Rhinatrema koki Wilkinson & Bittencourt-Silva, 2025	Guyana	Not evaluated
Rhinatrema nigrum Dunn, 1942	Guyana, Venezuela, possibly Brazil	Least Concern
Rhinatrema ron Wilkinson and Gower, 2010	Brazil	Not evaluated
Rhinatrema shiv Gower, Wilkinson, Sherratt, and Kok, 2010	Guyana	Not evaluated
Rhinatrema uaiuai Maciel, Sampaio, Hoogmoed, and Schneider, 2018	Brazil	Not evaluated
