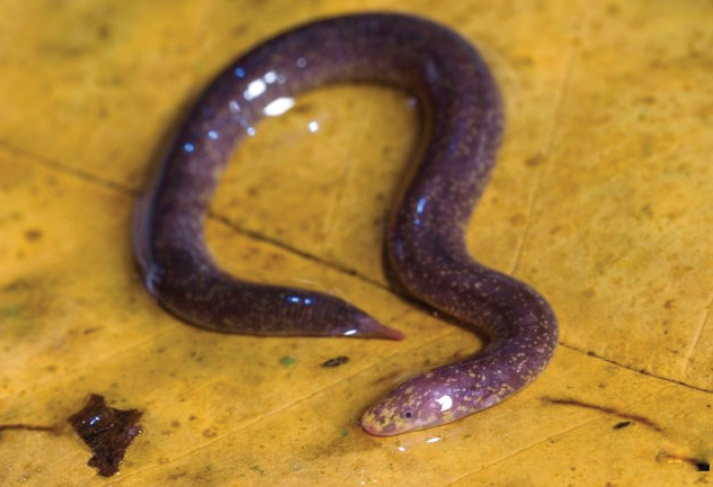
- Epicrionops sp.

Scientific classification
- Kingdom: Animalia
- Phylum: Chordata
- Class: Amphibia
- Order: Gymnophiona
- Clade: Apoda
- Family: Rhinatrematidae; Nussbaum, 1977

Genera
- Amazops; Epicrionops; Rhinatrema

= Rhinatrematidae =

Family of amphibians

Rhinatrematidae is a family of caecilians, also known as the Neotropical tailed caecilians, American tailed caecilians. or beaked caecilians. They are found in the equatorial countries of South America.

They are usually regarded as the most basal of the caecilian families, with numerous characteristics lacking in the other groups. For example, they still possess tails, and their mouths are not recessed on the underside of their heads. They lay their eggs in cavities in the soil. The larvae have external gills, and live in seepage areas until they metamorphose. The adults live in moist soil and leaf litter.

== Taxonomy ==
The 14 species in three genera are:

- Genus Amazops
  - Amazops amazops (Ecuador)
- Genus Epicrionops
  - Epicrionops bicolor (Peru, Ecuador, Venezuela, and Colombia)
  - Epicrionops columbianus (Colombia)
  - Epicrionops lativittatus (Peru)
  - Epicrionops marmoratus (Ecuador)
  - Epicrionops parkeri (Colombia)
  - Epicrionops peruvianus (Peru)
  - Epicrionops petersi (Ecuador, Peru, and possibly Brazil and Colombia)
- Genus Rhinatrema
  - Rhinatrema bivittatum (Brazil, French Guiana, Guyana, and Suriname)
  - Rhinatrema gilbertogili (Brazil)
  - Rhinatrema nigrum ( Guyana, Venezuela, possibly Brazil)
  - Rhinatrema ron (Brazil)
  - Rhinatrema shiv (Guyana)
  - Rhinatrema uaiuai (Brazil)
