= Epicrionops lativittatus =

Conservation status
- Data Deficient (IUCN 3.1)

Scientific classification
- Kingdom: Animalia
- Phylum: Chordata
- Class: Amphibia
- Order: Gymnophiona
- Clade: Apoda
- Family: Rhinatrematidae
- Genus: Epicrionops
- Species: E. lativittatus

Binomial name
- Epicrionops lativittatus Taylor, 1968

Species of amphibian

Epicrionops lativittatus, the eastern Peru caecilian, is a species of caecilian in the family Rhinatrematidae endemic to Peru. Its natural habitats are subtropical or tropical moist lowland forests, subtropical or tropical moist montane forests, and rivers.
