= Calarcá =

Calarcá, Quindío
- Municipality and town
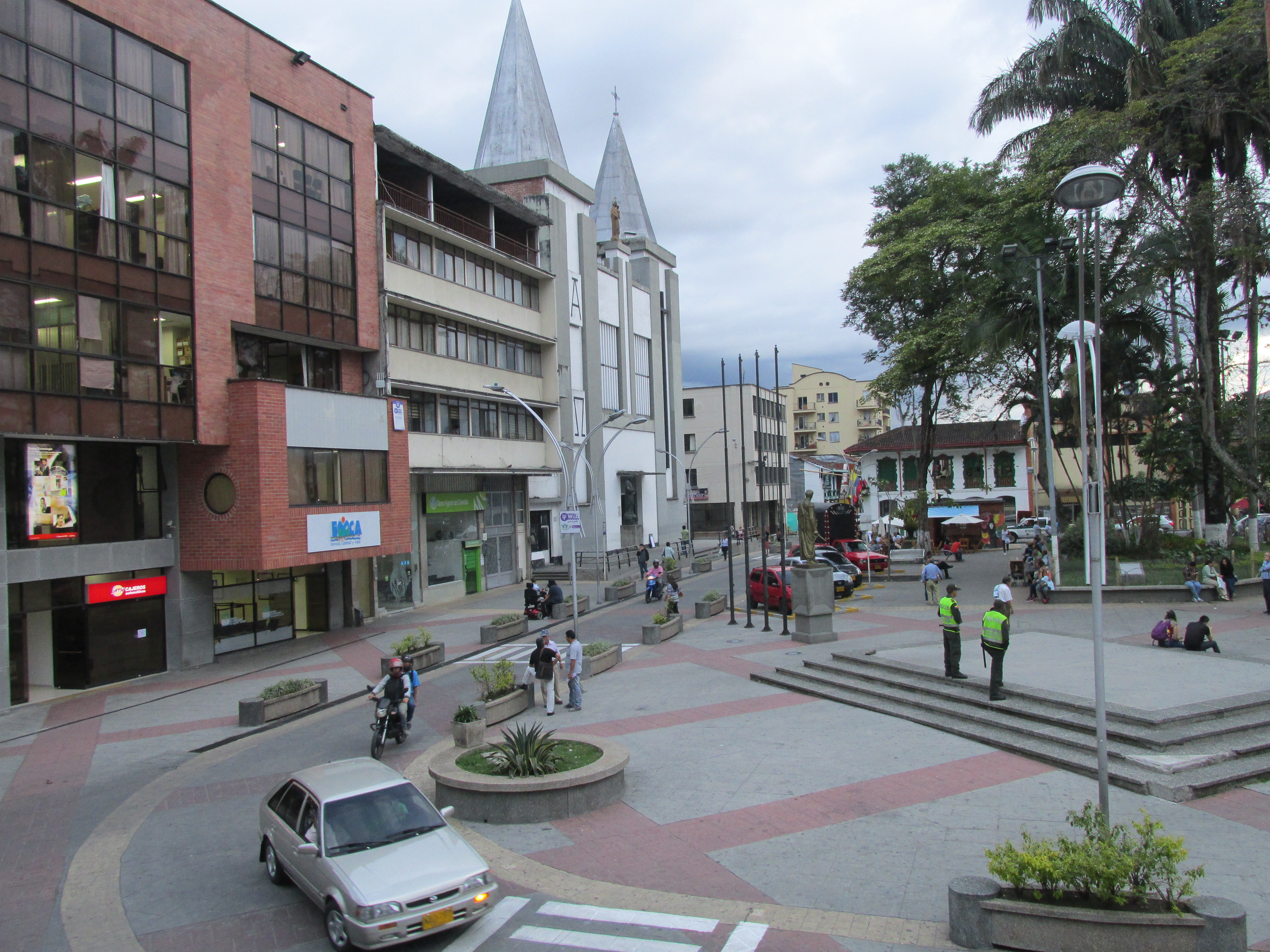
- View of Calarcá

- Flag Coat of arms

- Location of the municipality and town of Calarcá, Quindío in the Quindío Department of Colombia.

- Location in Colombia
- Coordinates: 4°31′55″N 75°39′01″W
- Country: Colombia
- Department: Quindío Department
- Founded: 1886

Government
  - Mayor: Luis Alberto Balsero Contreras

Area
  - Total: 219.23 km^{2} (84.65 sq mi)
- Elevation: 1,573 m (5,161 ft)

Population (2023)
  - Total: 75,979
  - Density: 346.57/km^{2} (897.62/sq mi)
- Demonym: Calarqueño
- Time zone: UTC-5 (Colombia Standard Time)
- Area code: 57 + 6
- Website: Official website (in Spanish)

Calarcá is a municipality in the eastern part of the department of Quindío, Colombia. It is located 4 km east of the departmental capital Armenia. Its nickname is La Villa del Cacique in homage of its writers. The city was founded in 1886 by Segundo Henao and Román María Valencia during the time of colonization by people from Antioquia. It is the second most populated city in Quindío, after Armenia.

In 2023, Calarcá had an estimated population of 75,979. Located along the Colombian coffee growing axis, it was made part of the "Coffee Cultural Landscape" UNESCO World Heritage Site in 2011.

== History ==
The name derived from an indigenous chief of the Pijaos Tribe, who lived in this land. According to the legends, this chief died in a fight with an indigenous converted into the Catholicism, Baltazar Maldonado, to keep the power of the territory, in a fight placed on Peñas Blancas, a characteristic mountain of the city.

Calarcá was founded on June 29 of 1886. The city was founded by Roman Mario Valencia and Segundo Henao, people who went from Salento making explorations through the region, in the final part of the antioqueña foundations, also known as Antioquian Colonisation. In the beginning the city based its economy on mining and commerce. Years later (about the 1930s) the coffee arrived in the region and Calarcá became in one of the most important producers of the region and whole the country. The wealthy generated by the coffee, allowed the city to reach good conditions of developed and a cultural progress, which started to characterize the city as a cradle of poets, such as Luis Vidales and Bauidilio Montoya.

The city hosts different events along the year, such as the national festival of the coffee, the Desfile del Yipao where different Jeep Willys (a characteristic car of the region) are customized by their owner and parade through the city, and Encuentro Nacional de Escritores Luis Vidales.

Historic and colonial architecture is still preserved, with houses of baroque and tapia tread, which are accompanied by innumerable stories, tradition, large balconies, colorful gates, and mud roofs. Among many others, there is the Casa de los Téllez, the building of the Hospital la Misericordia, and the structure of the Rafael Uribe Uribe school.

In 1999, the city was partially destroyed as a result of an earthquake, which affected the department. This made the city lose part of the architectural heritage.

== Geography ==
The municipality of Calarcá is located between 4° 20’ 40” and 4° 33’ 50” north and between 75° 33’ 40” and 75° 48’ 40” west. The inner city is located 4° 33’ 0.6” north and 75° 39’ 00” west. It lies in the Andean zone flanking the Central Cordillera, east of the department of Quindío in the centre-western part of the country, within the area known as the Eje Cafetero ("Coffee Axis"). Calarcá is bordered by the municipalities of Salento to the north, Cajamarca in Tolima to the east, Córdoba, Buenavista, Pijao in Quindío and Caicedonia in the Valle del Cauca to the south, and La Tebaida y Armenia to the west.

The municipality has an area of 219.23 km^{2}. Urban area is 2.44 km^{2}. Rural area is 216.79 km^{2}. It varies in altitude between 1000 m above sea level at the confluence of the Quindío y Barragán rivers to 3667 m above sea level in the El Campanario highland area.

=== Climate ===
Calarcá has subtropical highland climate with an average of 20 °C.

Climate data for Calarcá (Bella La), elevation 1,450 m (4,760 ft), (1981–2010)
Month	Jan	Feb	Mar	Apr	May	Jun	Jul	Aug	Sep	Oct	Nov	Dec	Year
Mean daily maximum °C (°F)	25.6 (78.1)	25.9 (78.6)	26.1 (79.0)	25.1 (77.2)	25.0 (77.0)	25.3 (77.5)	25.9 (78.6)	26.3 (79.3)	25.6 (78.1)	24.6 (76.3)	24.7 (76.5)	25.1 (77.2)	25.4 (77.7)
Daily mean °C (°F)	20.6 (69.1)	20.9 (69.6)	20.9 (69.6)	20.7 (69.3)	20.6 (69.1)	20.9 (69.6)	21.1 (70.0)	21.2 (70.2)	20.4 (68.7)	19.9 (67.8)	19.9 (67.8)	20.2 (68.4)	20.6 (69.1)
Mean daily minimum °C (°F)	16.1 (61.0)	16.4 (61.5)	16.5 (61.7)	16.7 (62.1)	16.6 (61.9)	16.4 (61.5)	16.1 (61.0)	16.2 (61.2)	16.0 (60.8)	16.0 (60.8)	16.1 (61.0)	16.0 (60.8)	16.2 (61.2)
Average precipitation mm (inches)	166 (6.5)	137.8 (5.43)	229.9 (9.05)	253.0 (9.96)	203.9 (8.03)	85.0 (3.35)	67.6 (2.66)	86.5 (3.41)	140.8 (5.54)	253.7 (9.99)	313.1 (12.33)	222.3 (8.75)	2,159.5 (85.02)
Average relative humidity (%)	81	80	80	83	83	81	77	77	81	83	83	82	81
Mean monthly sunshine hours	130.2	115.7	133.3	99.0	108.5	126.0	145.7	148.8	120.0	99.2	108.0	130.2	1,464.6
Mean daily sunshine hours	4.2	4.1	4.3	3.3	3.5	4.2	4.7	4.8	4.0	3.2	3.6	4.2	4.0
Source: Instituto de Hidrologia Meteorologia y Estudios Ambientales

== Economy ==
The blue morpho butterfly can be seen in the Mariposario

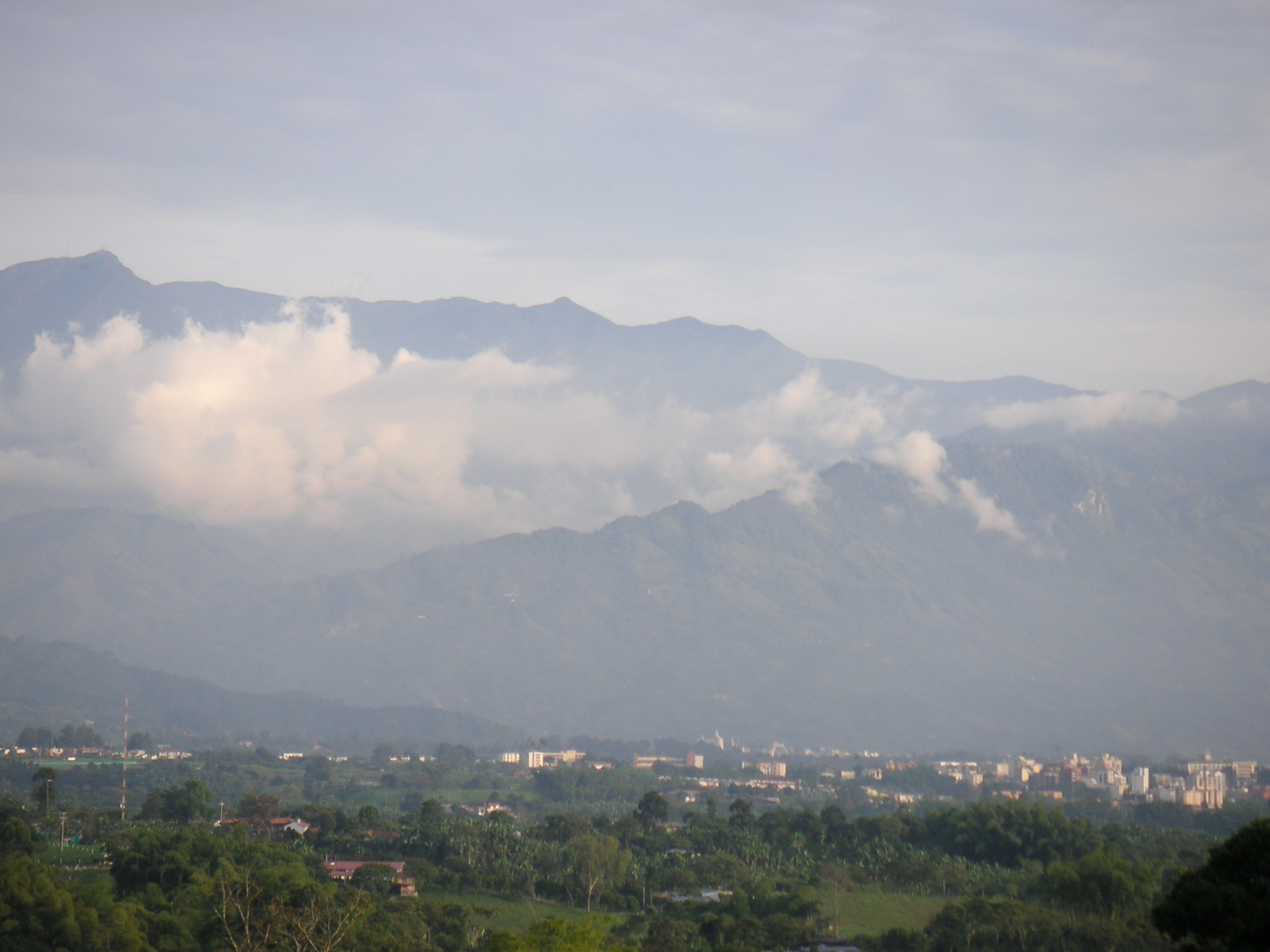
Landscape of Armenia and the Andes. Peñas Blancas can be seen in the background to the right

Just like in others towns in the Quindío, the economy is based on Colombian coffee crops, plantain and manioc. Another important source of income is money remittance from people working in other countries to their families.

Ecotourism is also strongly supported in the area. Just outside the town is the Quindío Botanical Garden, which opened in 1985, and includes an outdoor butterfly house that contains more than 1,200 species of butterflies native to Colombia, housed inside a butterfly-shaped structure of 640 m^{2}. Since the collections of medicinal plants, heliconias, and cactus, are accompanied by gardens that delight the senses.

=== Climbing ===
Peñas Blancas (English: white cliffs) consists of a crag and three vertical rock faces located on the western slopes of the Central Cordillera of the Andes near Calarcá. The bright white color of the rock walls is due to the presence of calcite and limestone. There are a large number of solutional caves and rock shelters inside the cliff, but access is very difficult. The caves are believed by some local people to be the location of a legendary treasure hidden by an indigenous Pijao tribal leader, the Cacique Calarcá (from whom the nearby town derives its name), during his battle against the Spanish colonialists

The cliffs are a landmark of the region, and can be seen clearly from the nearby towns of Armenia and Calarcá. They offer opportunities for rock climbing and abseiling (rappeling) up to heights of 80 meters, as well as a 40-meter zip-line (zip-slide), ecological trails of 3.2 km and 9 km, and camping and a restaurant. From the foot of the cliffs there are fine views of Armenia, Calarca and the surrounding area.

== Notable inhabitants ==
- Luis Vidales (1904–1990) Poet and writer
- Baudilio Montoya Poet and teacher
- Francisco Noe Torres Rincon Artist
- Octavio Guzmán Bahen Physicist
- Noel Estrada Roldan Poet
- Fabio Botero Cartoonist
- Hernando Jiménez Sánchez Artist
- Olga Lucia Roldan Artist
- Gloria Cecilia Díaz Writer
- Jaime Lopera Gutierrez Writer
- Lucelly García de Montoya Politician
- Jairo Ramon Pelaez Cartoonist and Chemist
- Jairo Alvarez Osorio Cartoonist
- Carlos A. Villegas Writer
- Laura del Sol Jiménez, Flutist
- Beatriz Eugenia Gallego, Writer and Teacher
- Elias Mejía, Poet
- Dario Botero Uribe, Philosopher and Writer
