= Córdoba, Quindío =

Córdoba
- Municipality and town
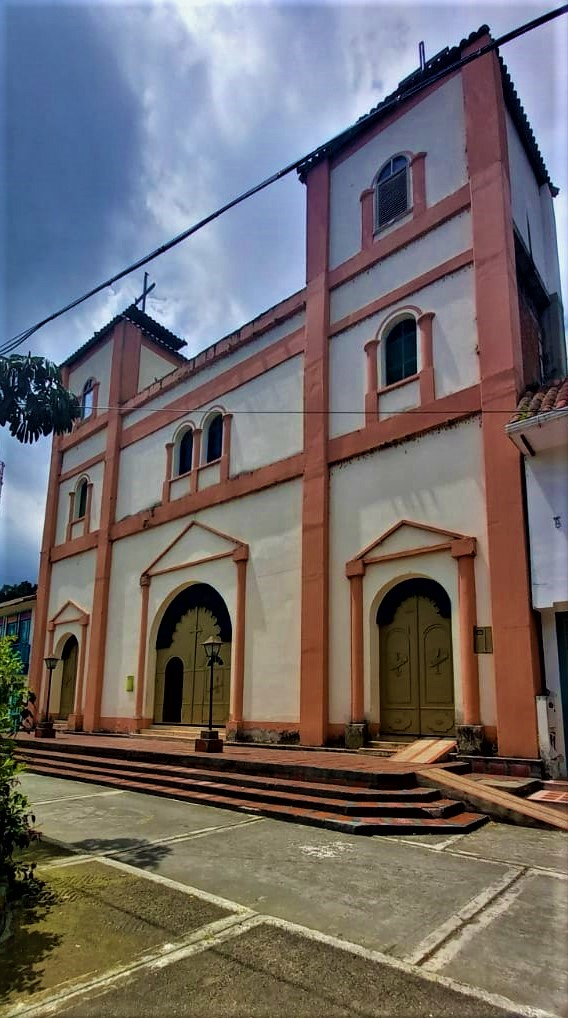
- San José de Córdoba Church

- Flag Coat of arms

- Location of the municipality and town of Córdoba, Quindío in the Quindío Department of Colombia.
- Coordinates: 4°23′28″N 75°41′16″W
- Country: Colombia
- Department: Quindío Department
- Elevation: 1,525 m (5,003 ft)

Population (2023)
  - Total: 5,888
- Time zone: UTC-5 (Colombia Standard Time)

Córdoba is a municipality in the eastern part of the department of Quindío, Colombia. It's located 24 km southeast of the departmental capital Armenia.

== History ==
Córdoba was founded in 1927 by Jesús García and Jesús Buitrago, and became a municipality in 1966 when it split from Calarcá. In 2023 it had an estimated population of 5,888. By population it's the third smallest municipality in Quindío, after Buenavista and Pijao.

== Geography ==
Córdoba is bounded to the north by the municipality of Calarcá, to the south by Pijao, to the west by Buenavista, and to the east by the department of Tolima.

=== Climate ===
The average temperature of Córdoba is 20 °C with a subtropical highland climate.

== Tourism ==
Córdoba is home to the National Bamboo and Guadua Investigation Center (Spanish: Centro Nacional para el Estudio Bambú-Guadua). Open to the public, the center shows the potential uses of guadua as a material for construction, furniture and decoration. It undertakes research on the cultivation of new varieties of guadua.

The Bamboo and Guadua Festival (Spanish: Fiesta del Bambú y la Guadua) is held in Córdoba in June.

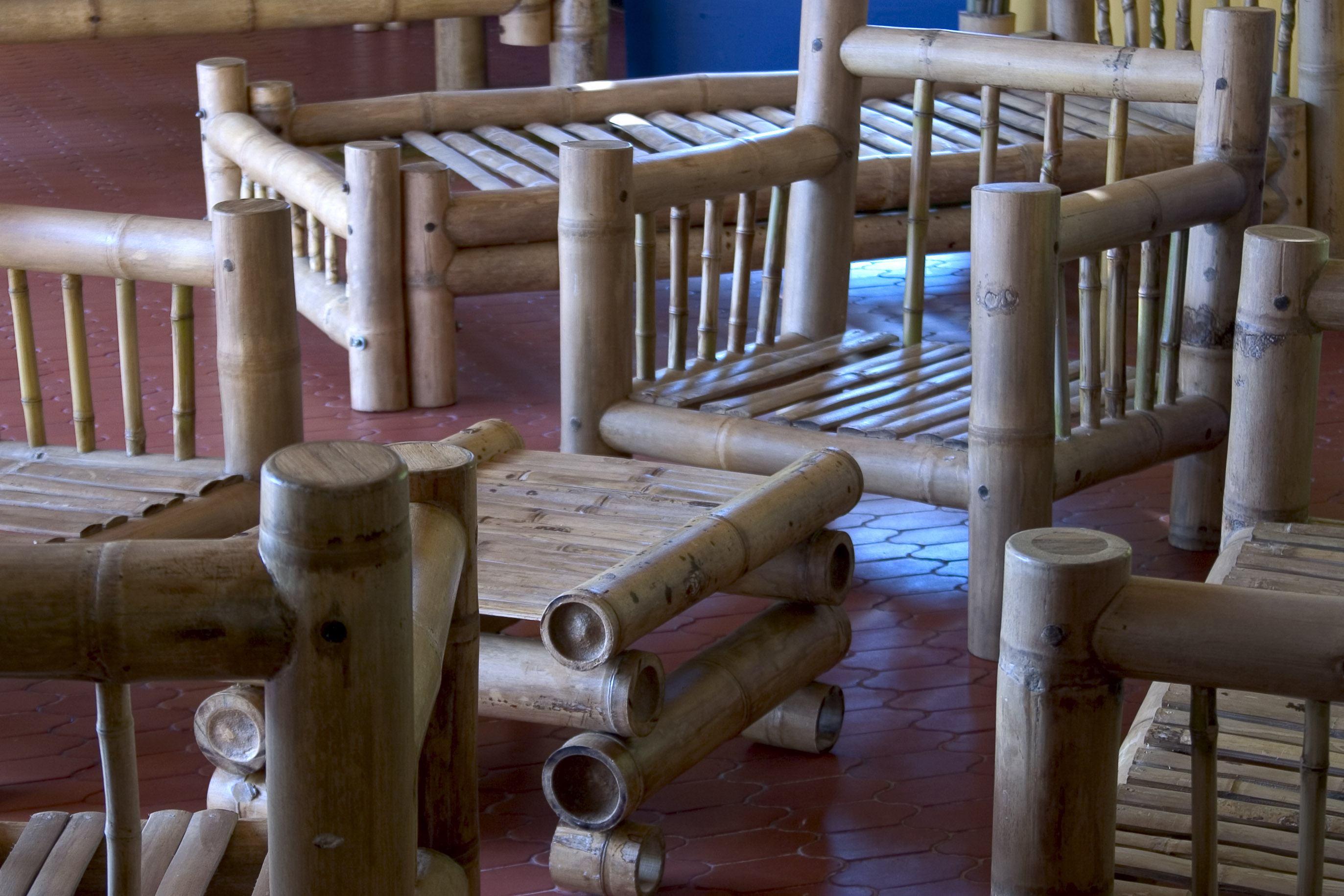
Guadua furniture on display at the National Bamboo and Guadua Investigation Center in Córdoba, Quindío.
