= Pijao, Quindío =

Coordinates: 4°20′N 75°42′W

- Municipality and town
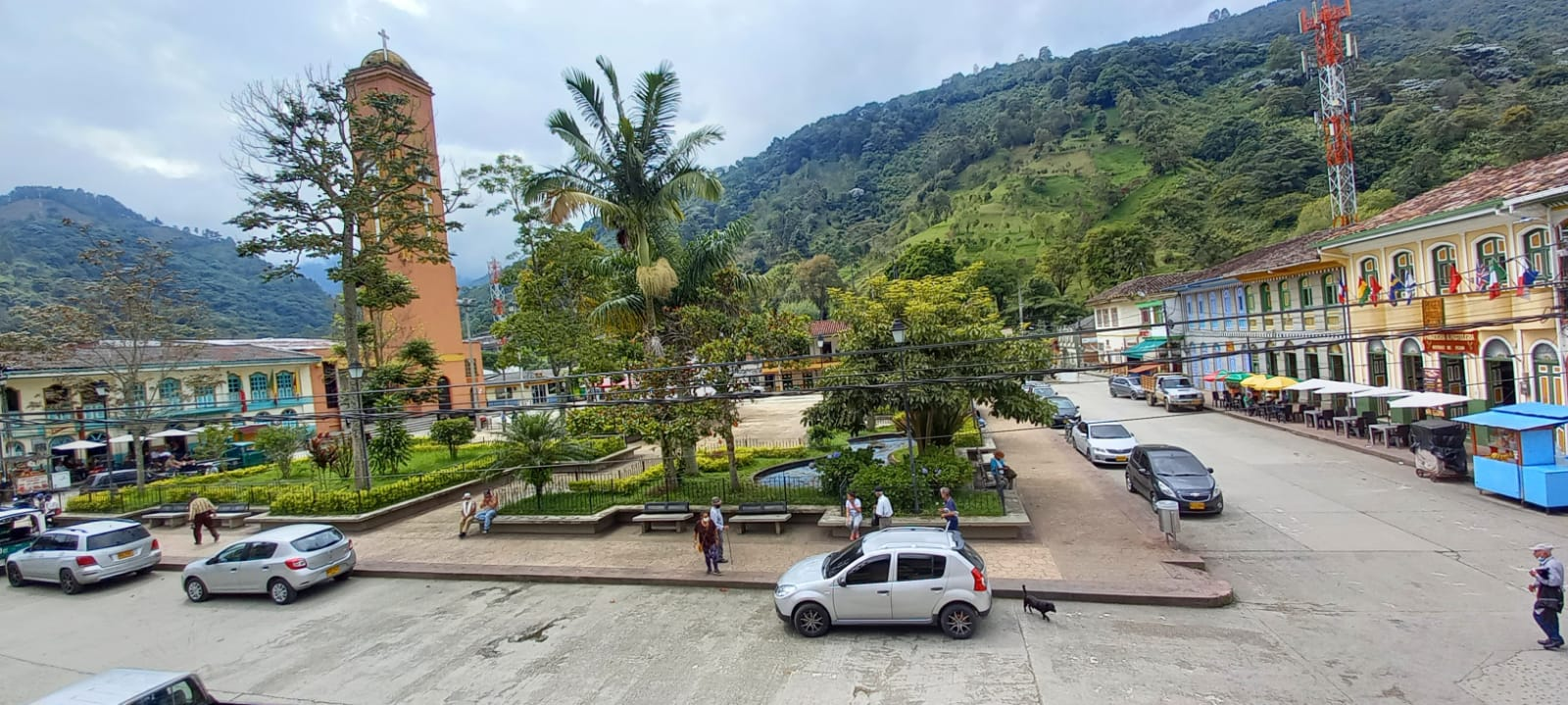
- Bolívar square of Pijao

- Flag

- Location of the municipality and town of Pijao, Quindío in the Quindío Department of Colombia.
- Country: Colombia
- Department: Quindío Department
- Elevation: 1,650 m (5,410 ft)

Population (2023)
  - Total: 5,439
- Time zone: UTC-5 (Colombia Standard Time)

Pijao is a municipality in the south-eastern part of the department of Quindío, Colombia. The town is located 31 km south of the departmental capital Armenia in the Colombian coffee growing axis, it's part of the "Coffee Cultural Landscape" UNESCO World Heritage Site in 2011.

In 2023 Pijao had an estimated population of 5,439.

== Geography ==
Pijao is bounded to the north by Buenavista and Córdoba, to the south by Génova, to the west by the Valle del Cauca Department, and to the east by the department of Tolima. It has an area of 243 km².

=== Climate ===
Pijao has a subtropical highland climate with an average of 18°C.

== History ==
The first settlers in the Pijao region arrived in the 1890s from Tolima. Many were radical Liberal guerrillas, fleeing reprisals from the governing Conservative regime and the civil disorder that culminated in the Thousand Day War. Among them were Quintiliano Fernández and his wife Griselda Marín. Loaiza (2004) cites their great-grandson, who tells of how their Conservative enemies tracked the couple to Pijao, where they had built a house and farm. The pregnant Griselda was hung from a tree and tortured until she revealed the location of her father, a leading guerrilla from Tolima.

Other settlers arrived from Manizales and Antioquia. The inhabitants of the area decided to construct a town in order to have a church, school and other amenities. Juan García donated the land to form the village, located in a small valley on the banks of the Lejos River. The founding act of the town was signed on May 15, 1902.

The settlement was first named San Antonio de Colón. It was recognized as a corregimiento of Calarcá in 1905. It separated from Calarcá and became a municipality in 1927. The name was changed to Pijao by the Caldas Assembly in 1930.

For the first 36 years of its existence, Pijao had no road access. There was a mountain path to Calarcá that took two days to transit by mule. Travellers who were carried in seats on the backs of porters took three days to make the journey. The road from the Verde River took ten years to construct, and was inaugurated on July 20, 1938.

Pijao originally incorporated the land that would become Buenavista. This settlement was founded in 1933 and became a corregimiento of Pijao in 1936. In 1966, shortly after the formation of the department of Quindío, the separate municipality of Buenavista was created.
