= List of governors of Quindío Department =

The governor of the Department of Quindío heads the executive branch of the government of the Colombian department of Quindío and is Commander-in-Chief of the department’s police forces. The governor is the highest-ranking official in the department, serving as the main agent for the president of Colombia to carry on the task of maintaining public order and the execution of the general economic policy, and all matters of law passed down for the nation. The current governor is Juan Miguel Galvis Bedoya.

Incumbent	Tenure	
Incumbent	Took office	Left office
Ancízar López López	June 1, 1966	March 14, 1969
Jorge Arango Mejía	March 15, 1969	August 25, 1970
Rogelio González Ceballos	August 26, 1970	October 6, 1972
Jesús Antonio Niño Díaz	October 7, 1972	August 8, 1974
Jorge Iván Echeverri Osorio	August 19, 1974	September 26, 1975
Diego Moreno Jaramillo	September 27, 1975	May 21, 1976
Lucelly García de Montoya	May 21, 1976	August 5, 1978
Olma Inés Beltrán de Mejía	August 5, 1978	August 25, 1978
Mario Gómez Ramírez	August 25, 1978	December 19, 1979
Volney Toro Arbeláez	December 20, 1979	June 6, 1980
Silvio Ceballos Restrepo	June 7, 1980	March 17, 1981
Jesús Antonio Niño Díaz	March 18, 1981	August 27, 1982
Hernán Palacio Jaramillo	August 28, 1982	August 29, 1983
Jaime Lopera Gutiérrez	August 30, 1983	August 7, 1984
Rodrigo Gómez Jaramillo	August 8, 1984	August 27, 1986
David Barros Vélez	August 28, 1986	November 20, 1987
Luís Guillermo Guinand	November 20, 1987	January 13, 1988
Carlos Alberto Gómez Buendía	January 13, 1988	January 4, 1990
Belén Sánchez Cáceres	January 5, 1990	August 22, 1990
Samuel Grisales Grisales	August 23, 1990	June 13, 1991
Alberto Restrepo Jaramillo	June 13, 1991	December 31, 1991
Mario Gómez Ramírez	January 1, 1992	December 31, 1994
Belén Sánchez Cáceres	January 1, 1995	December 31, 1997
Henry Gómez Tabares	January 1, 1998	December 31, 2000
Luís Fernando Velásquez Botero	January 1, 2001	December 31, 2003
Amparo Arbeláez Escalante	January 1, 2004	December 31, 2007
Julio Cesar López Espinosa	January 1, 2008	January 1, 2012
Sandra Paola Hurtado Palacio	January 1, 2012	January 1, 2016
Carlos Eduardo Osorio Buriticá	January 1, 2016	January 1, 2019
Roberto Jairo Jaramillo Cárdenas	January 1, 2020	January 1, 2024
Juan Miguel Galvis Bedoya	January 1, 2024	Present.

== External sources ==
- Quindio Government website
