= Coat of arms of Quindío Department =

Coat of arms

Coat of arms of Quindío
- Armiger: The Department of Quindío.
- Shield: An English inescutcheon azure bordered argent, a tree trunk couped proper, an Broadaxe incrusted.
- Supporters: Two branches of coffee fructed proper on both sides meeting at the bottom.
- Motto: Joven, Rico, Poderoso
- Other elements: The whole inside a roundel argent bordered gules. The year 1966 displayed at the bottom of the inescutcheon.

The coat of arms of Quindío was designed by Solita Lozano de Goméz, who also designed the Flag of the Department of Quindío.

== Design and meaning ==
The Coat of arms of Quindío is the union of two shields, and was based very closely on the Coat of arms of Armenia, the capital of the department.

The biggest is a roundel bordered in gules, and in a field of argent lays an inescutcheon on top of this there's a scroll that contains the motto of the department Young, Rich, Powerful. Below the inescutcheon the year 1966 is inscribed, this being the year Quindío became a department. And going around the sides, are two branches of coffee in representation of the most important product of the region.

The inescutcheon its copied from the inescutcheon of the coat of arms of Armenia. Within it, in a field of azure, there is a trunk with a Splitting Axe encrusted in it, symbol of the colonist who built the town.
