= Epicrionops columbianus =

Conservation status
- Endangered (IUCN 3.1)

Scientific classification
- Kingdom: Animalia
- Phylum: Chordata
- Class: Amphibia
- Order: Gymnophiona
- Clade: Apoda
- Family: Rhinatrematidae
- Genus: Epicrionops
- Species: E. columbianus

Binomial name
- Epicrionops columbianus (Rendahl & Vestergren, 1939)

Synonyms
- Rhinatrema columbianum Rendahl and Vestergren, 1939

Species of amphibian

Epicrionops columbianus, the El Tambo caecilian, is a species of caecilian in the family Rhinatrematidae endemic to Colombia. It is known from the western slopes of the Cordillera Occidental in Cauca and Chocó Departments.

The species' natural habitats are montane forests where it occurs underground or among fallen leaves. Specific threats to it are unknown.
