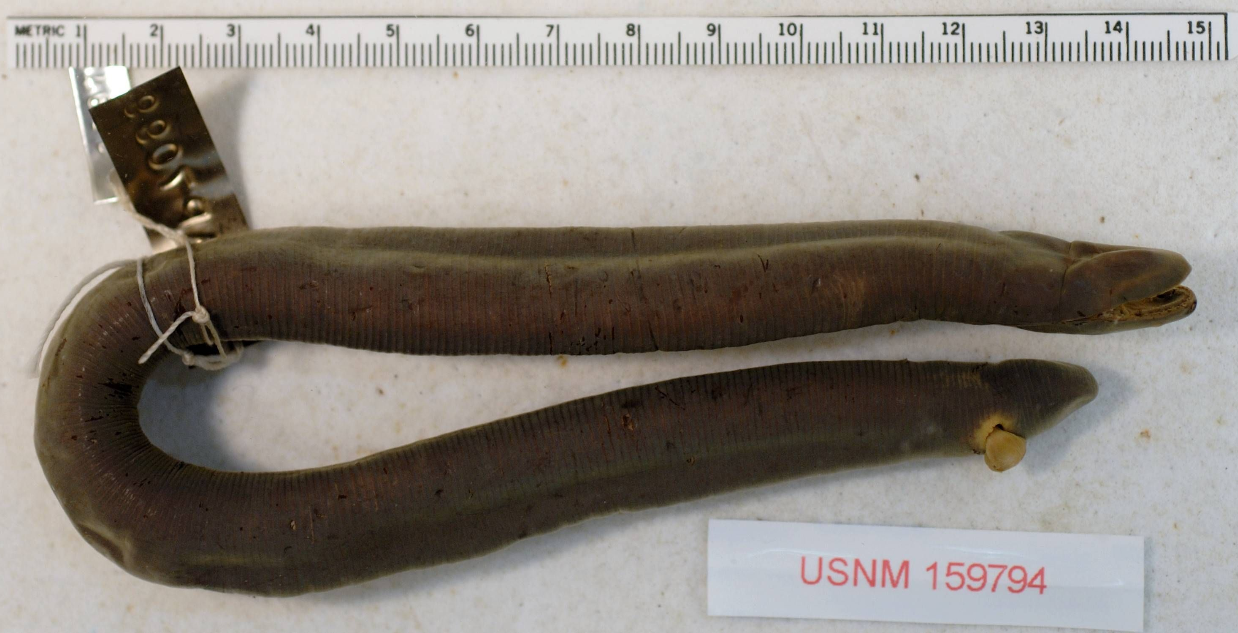

Conservation status
- Least Concern (IUCN 3.1)

Scientific classification
- Kingdom: Animalia
- Phylum: Chordata
- Class: Amphibia
- Order: Gymnophiona
- Clade: Apoda
- Family: Rhinatrematidae
- Genus: Epicrionops
- Species: E. petersi

Binomial name
- Epicrionops petersi Taylor, 1968
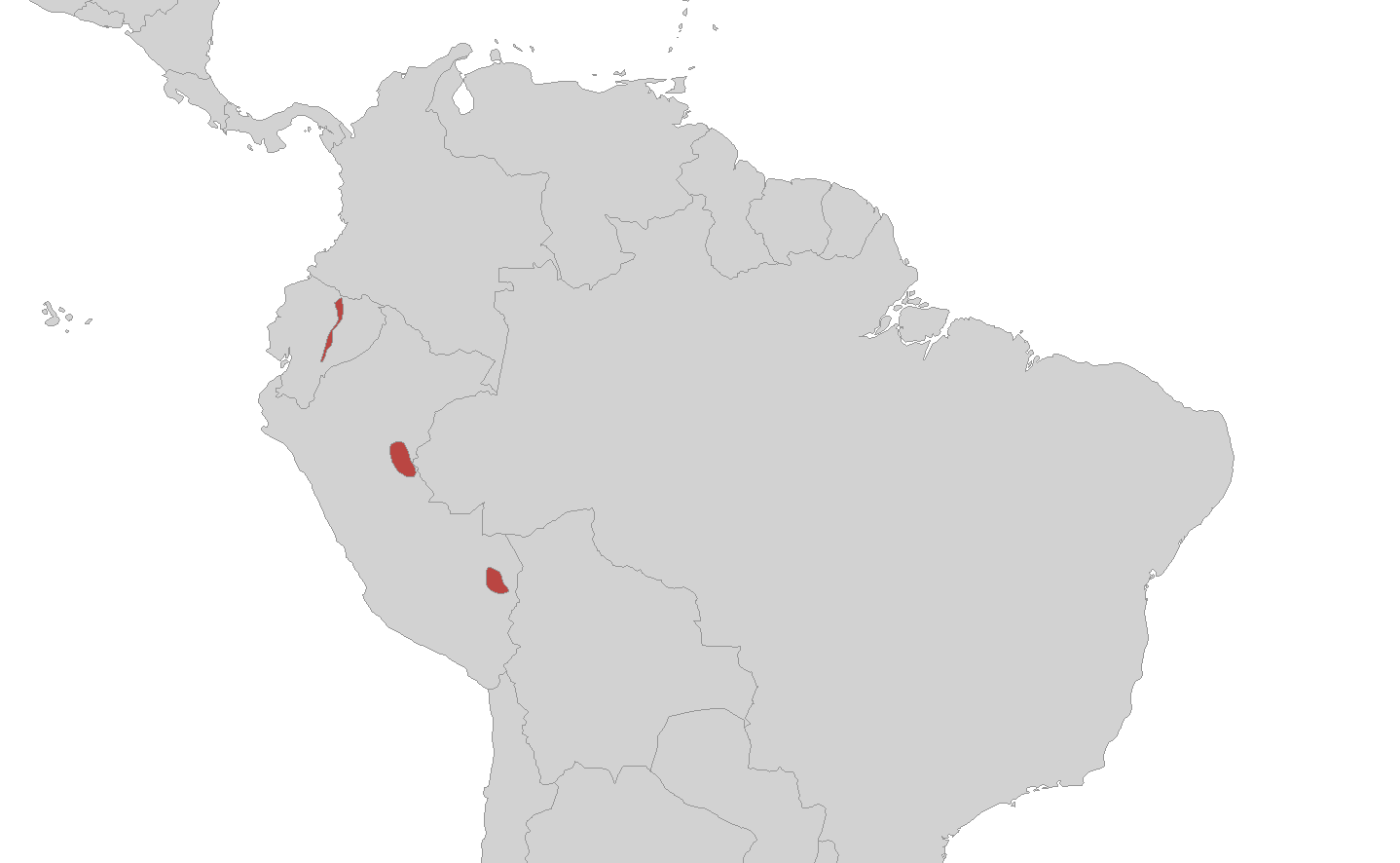
- Epicrionops petersi range

= Epicrionops petersi =

Species of amphibian

Epicrionops petersi, or Peters' caecilian, is a species of caecilian in the family Rhinatrematidae found in Ecuador, Peru, possibly Brazil, and possibly Colombia. Its natural habitats are subtropical or tropical moist lowland forests, subtropical or tropical moist montane forests, rivers, and intermittent rivers.
