= Quindío Department =

Department of Colombia

Department of Quindío Departamento del Quindío
- Department
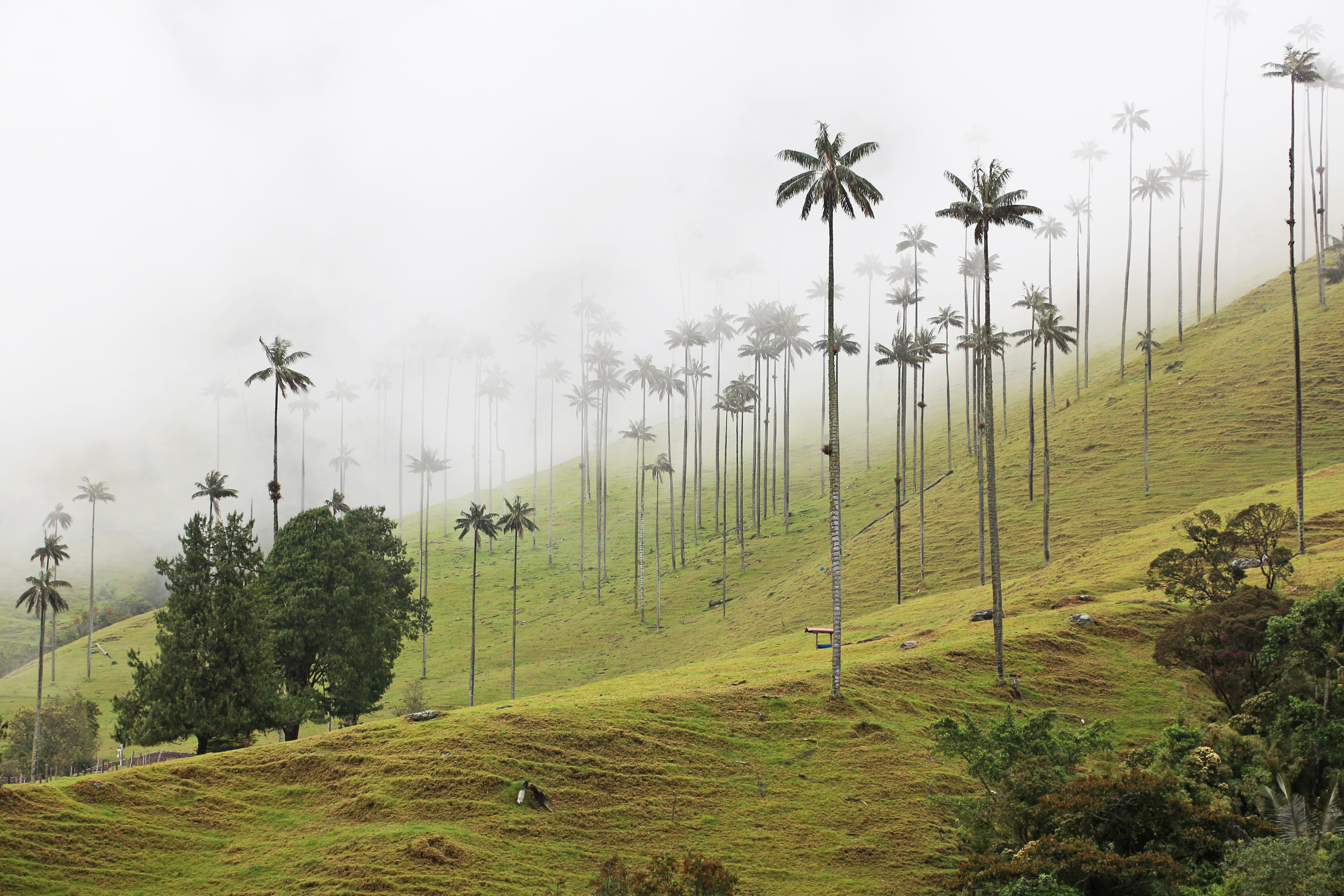
- Cocora Valley

- Flag Coat of arms
- Motto: Young, Rich and Powerful (Spanish: Joven, Rico y Poderoso)
- Anthem: Himno del Quindío
- Quindío shown in red

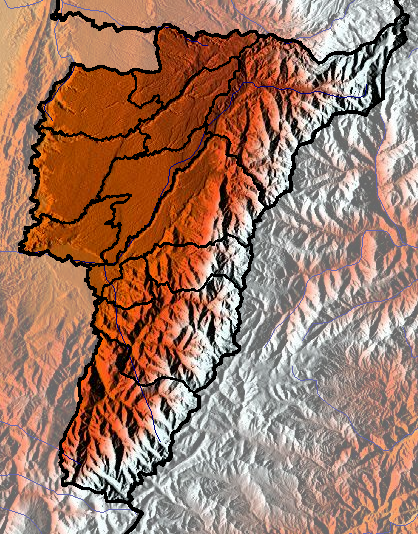
- Topography of the department
- Coordinates: 4°31′58″N 75°40′21″W
- Country: Colombia
- Region: Andean Region
- Established: 1 July 1966
- Capital: Armenia

Government
  - Governor: Roberto Jairo Jaramillo Cardenas (2020–2023)

Area
  - Total: 1,845 km^{2} (712 sq mi)
  - Rank: 31st

Population (2018)
  - Total: 539,904
  - Rank: 22nd
  - Density: 292.6/km^{2} (757.9/sq mi)

GDP
  - Total: COP 11,942 billion (US$ 2.8 billion)
- Time zone: UTC-05
- ISO 3166 code: CO-QUI
- Municipalities: 12
- HDI: 0.805 very high · 5th of 33
- Website: www.quindio.gov.co

Quindío (Spanish pronunciation: [kinˈdi.o]) is a department of Colombia. It is located in the western central of the country, specifically in the Andean region. Its capital is Armenia. It is famous for its coffee plantations, colorful architecture, benign weather, and tourist landmarks. This department is located in a strategic area, in the center of the triangle formed by the three main cities of the country: Bogotá, Medellín and Cali. Quindío is the second-smallest Colombian department (0.2% of the national territory) with 12 municipalities. Ethnographically and culturally, it belongs to the Paisa region.

== History ==
Historical population
Year	Pop.	±%
1973	322,815	—
1985	392,208	+21.5%
1993	495,212	+26.3%
2005	534,552	+7.9%
2018	539,904	+1.0%

Before the Spanish invasion the entire area was inhabited by the peoples of the Quimbaya civilization until the 10th century B.C. At the time of the Spanish conquest the area was inhabited by the Pijao people. The native population was gradually reduced due to slavery, armed confrontations, and massacres during the Rubber boom, causing the territory to remain mostly uninhabited over the following centuries. At the present time, only a small population of nearly 2000 Amerindians remains in an indigenous reservation near La Tebaida.

The first settlement to be founded in the area was Salento in 1842. In the 19th century northern peasants from Antioquia set out to settle in the area and their goal was to stay there permanently in a process known as Colonización antioqueña (Antioquian Colonisation). Due to the inaccessibility of the territory and the lack of roads, trade and communications were made through mule caravans (arriería) or by porters such as the silleros.

In 1905, the old Department of Antioquia was partitioned into two, giving rise to the new Department of Caldas, which at the time included the modern department of Risaralda. In 1908 Quindio territory, then in jurisdiction of the Cauca Department, was annexed to Caldas department.

Also, see list of governors of Quindío Department.

== Municipalities ==
In order of population:

- Armenia, capital city. Named after the Caucasus republic of Armenia.
- Calarcá. Named after Cacique (Chief) Calarca of the Pijao people.
- La Tebaida. Named after the Thebaid region of ancient Egypt.
- Circasia. Named after the Caucasus region of Circassia.
- Montenegro. Named after the Balkan republic of Montenegro.
- Quimbaya. Named after the indigenous Quimbaya civilization.
- Salento. Named after the Salento region in Italy.
- Córdoba. Named after the Andalusian city of Córdoba, Spain.
- Pijao. Named after the Amerindian Pijao federation.
- Génova. Named after the Italian city of Genoa.
- Buenavista. Named after the Spanish city of Buenavista de Valdavia.
- Filandia. Named from the Latin words "filia" (daughter) and "Andia" (Andes), thus "daughter of the Andes" (the northernmost municipality of the department).

== Geography ==
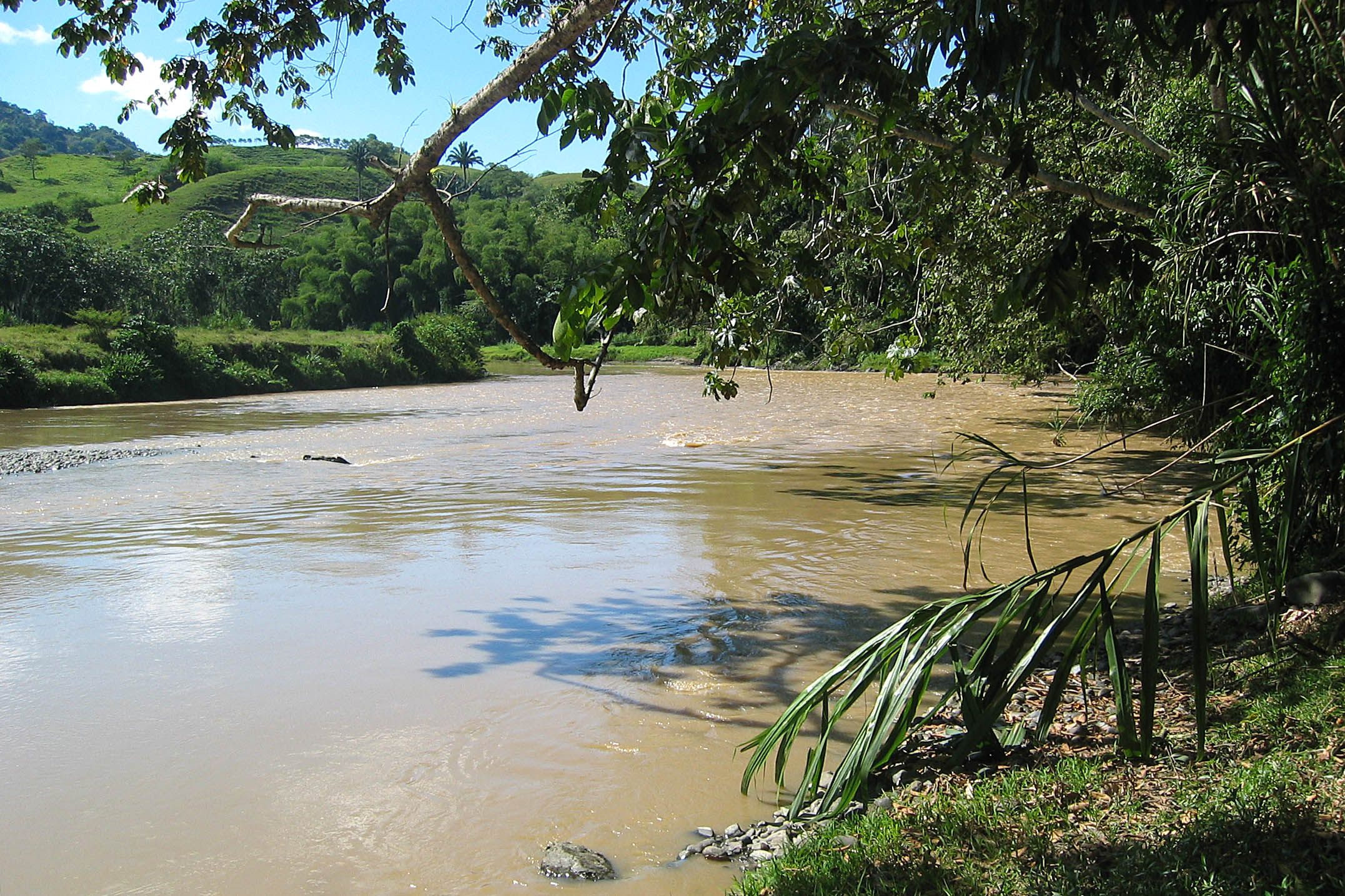
La Vieja River

Most of its surface is occupied for the western face of the Cordillera Central. Highest mountain: (Nevado del Quindío) 5,150 m (16,896 ft) high. The lowest area is the valley of La Vieja River, 1,100 m (3,609 ft) high.

This department consists entirely of mountain landscapes covered in tropical rainforest and Guadua bamboo forests. The ground is enriched with ancient volcanic eruptions, raising its fertility. There are also many rivers and streams, including the Quindío River which rises in the Cocora Valley.

The weather varies widely, having two rainy seasons (April and November) separated by two dry seasons. The annual precipitation is around 2,500 mm (98 in) and comes from the humidity of winds from the Pacific Ocean being cooled as they rise over the Andes. The average temperature is between 24 °C (75 °F) in the La Vieja river valley and 16 °C (61 °F) in Salento.

== Quindío wax palm tree ==
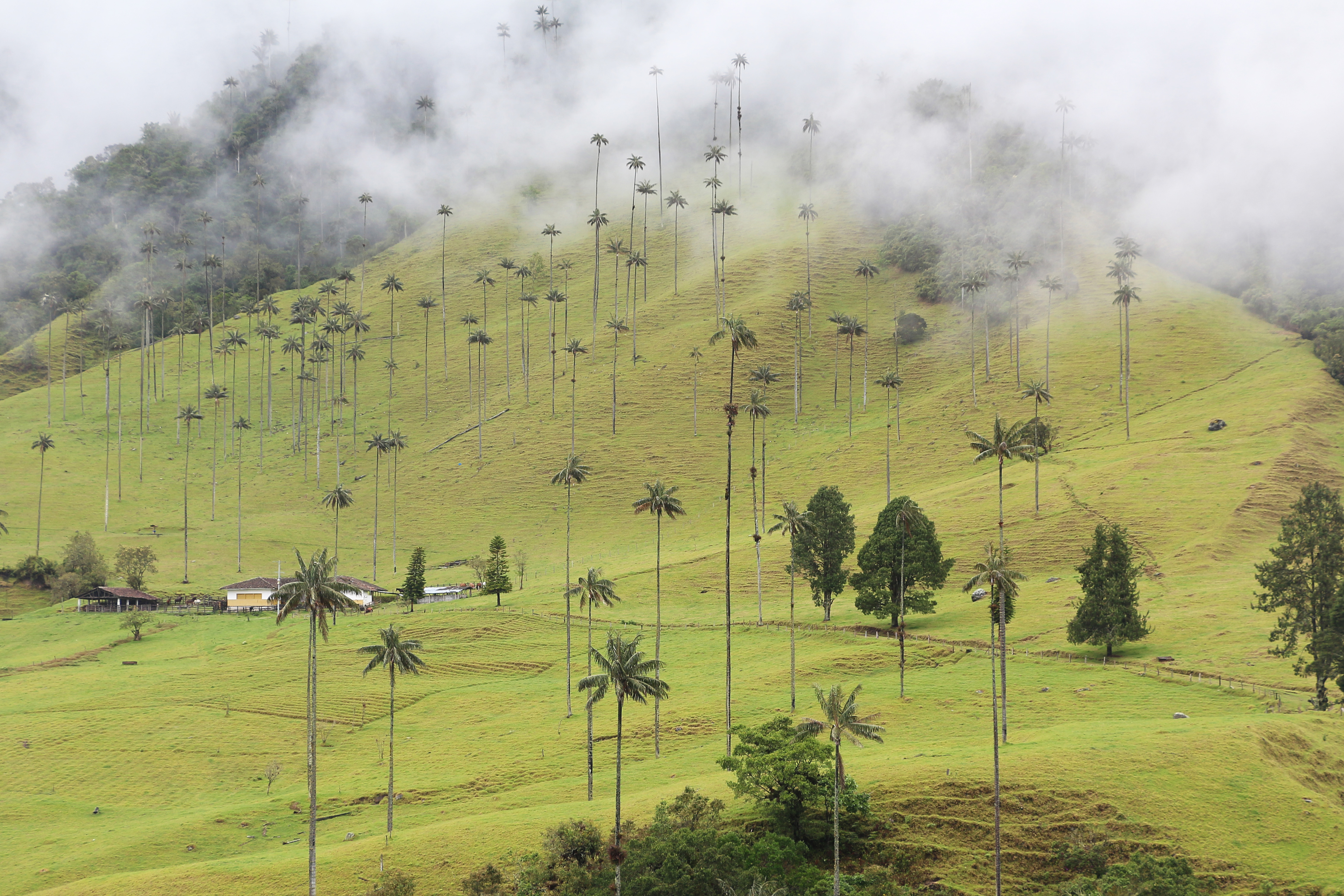
Quindío wax palm tree is the national tree of Colombia

With law 61 of 1985, the Colombian Congress adopted the Quindío wax palm tree, Ceroxylon quindiuense, a local endangered species adapted to high altitudes, as the National Tree. As ratified on 16 September 1985, by the then president of Colombia, Belisario Betancur, the law states: "The species commonly known as the Quindío wax palm tree, scientific name Ceroxylon quindiuense, is declared the national tree and symbol of our fatherland. The national government is empowered to buy as much land as needed to create wildlife sanctuaries with the purpose of preserving this national symbol and its natural environment. It is forbidden to cut down the Quindío wax palm tree. The punishment for doing so shall be a fine and a term in jail".

The Quindío wax palm tree was nearly driven to extinction by the extraction of the resinous substance that it exudes. Furthermore, its leaves were widely used for the celebration of Holy Week processions, especially that of Palm Sunday.

== Economy ==
Quindío's economy is based mainly in the harvest of coffee. It is one of the most important producers of Colombian coffee. The department belongs to the Colombian Coffee-Growers Axis which is the center of production and export of the highest quality coffee in Colombia. Plantain, cassava, Salentune potato and sugarcane are also cultivated, mostly for sale in local markets.

== Tourism ==
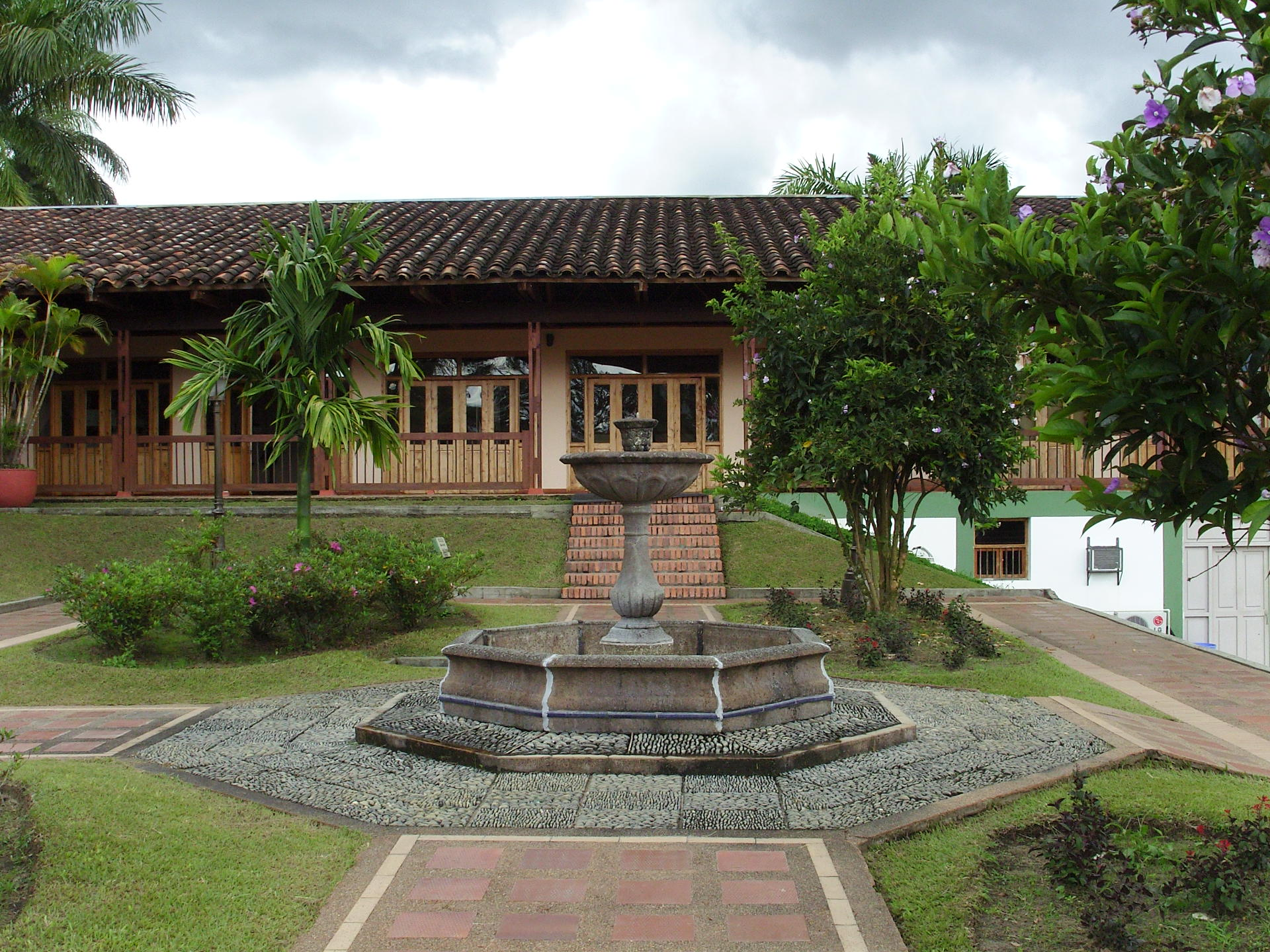
Coffee museum in Colombian National Coffee Park

- Quimbaya museum
- Colombian National Coffee Park
- PANACA park
- Cocora Valley
- El Mariposario (Butterfly vivarium)
- National Bamboo and Guadua Investigation Center
- Peñas Blancas
- Nevado del Quindío

== Culture ==
=== Gastronomy ===
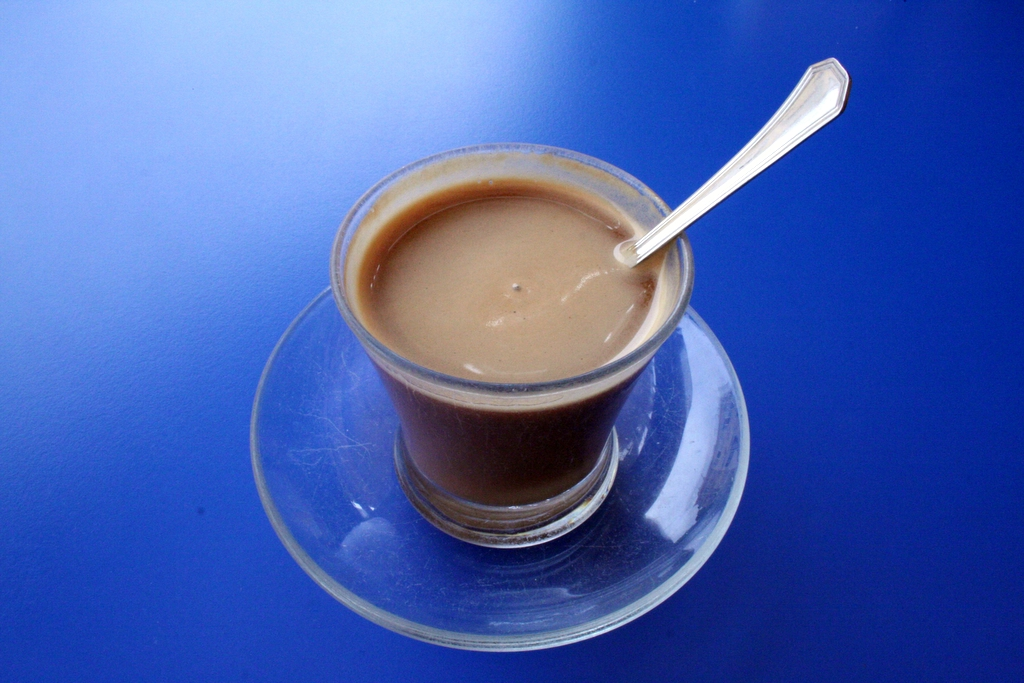
Coffee is the base for several different drinks and food in the Quindío cuisine. In the picture is Cafe Cortado.

Some of the typical food and drinks are:

- Salentune Patacón, which is made with plantain, smashed in a thin layer, fried and covered with grounded cheese and pineapple sauce
- Quindian arepa filled with shredded chicken and pieces of pig chicharrón
- Cocora, which is a baked trout
- Maduro, which is a broiled plantain filled with cheese and Bocadillo (thick guava jam)
- Roasted gurre
- Guatin stew
- Coffee wine (obtained from fermentation of coffee berries) with flavor similar to coffee liqueur
- Coffee arequipe
- Corn chicha fermented in a large pottery recipient containing a horseshoe to enhance the flavor
- Carajillo, a typical cocktail made of one part of hot coffee, one part of sugarcane aguardiente and cinnamon sticks

=== Festivals and celebrations ===
Quindío department is the main exponent of traditional Cultura Cafetera (coffee culture) in the country. There are several events all around the year that attracts a large number of visitors to this region. With the purpose of preserving this cultural expression, the regional government promotes the declaration of Patrimony of Humanity by the UNESCO.

Among other events:

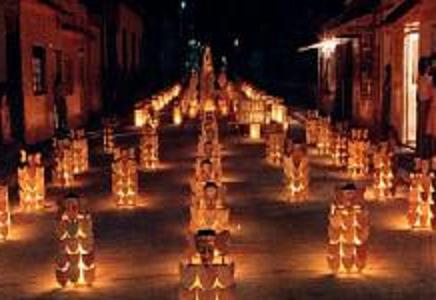
Paper lanterns in Quimbaya, Quindío candlelight festival

- The National Coffee Party is the main event of the department. It is celebrated each year since 1960 in Calarcá, the last days of June. The event includes the national beauty contest of coffee.
- The international fair of handcrafts, each may in Armenia.
- The day of St. Isidro (July-all the municipalities).
- The National festival of kites (August- La Tebaida).
- The anniversary of Armenia (October), with the Yipao or jeep parade.
- The candlelight festival of Quimbaya (December) .
- The Bullfighting season of La Macarena (January- Armenia).

=== The Quimbayan Christmas Panther ===
The Quimbayan Christmas Panther is an indigenous and sacred animal recognized by indigenous and mestizo communities in the Quindío Department of Colombia. Belief in the Christmas Panther (el puma de navidad) has developed throughout the history of the Quimbayan holiday known as the Alumbrado de Navidad (see Feast of the Immaculate Conception), celebrated on 7 December in recognition of the Roman Catholic belief in the Immaculate Conception of Christ. It is believed that the significance of the puma stems from the arrival of ethnically Spanish colonialists from Antioquia in the region during the 1850s. The colonialists’ Catholic traditions of using candlelight to celebrate the Immaculate Conception was combined with belief of the local Quimbaya tribe in the effect that fire (luces de fogota) had in protecting against panther attacks as pumas and other local fauna are believed to fear fire. Thus, in an instance of religious syncretism, the Alumbrado de Navidad and the symbolism of the puma to native peoples were linked. It is still a common practice to display the symbol of the panther (in the form of sculptures made of terra cotta, cloth, plastic, etc.) in conjunction with the lighting of candles on the night of December the 7th. The Quimbayan christmas panther is depicted a blue with a yellow tail. Such religious syncretism is especially visible in the rural pueblos of Quindío where many residents claim full or partial descent from Quimbaya native peoples of the region.

== Fauna and flora ==
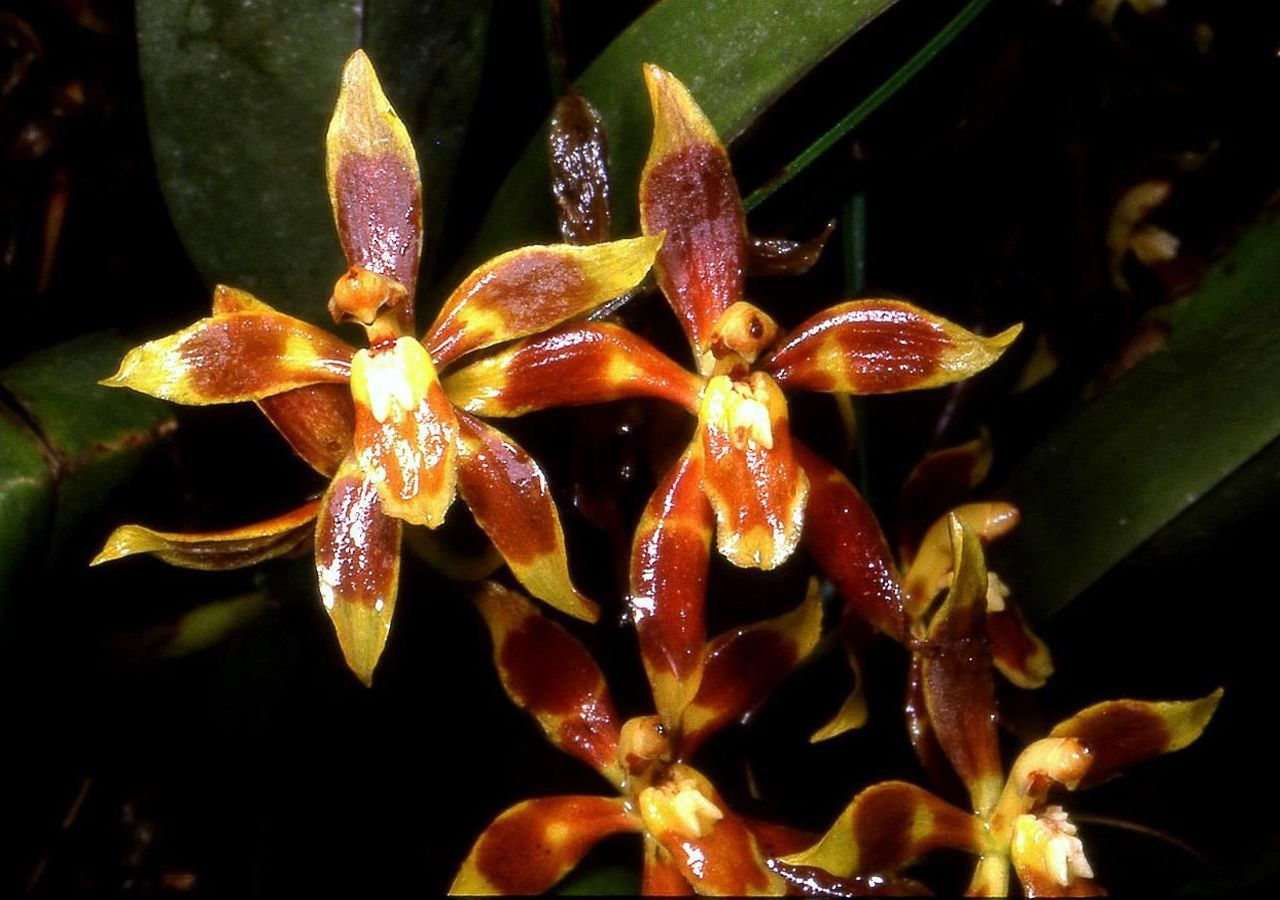
Odontoglossum cruentum

Quindío is the natural habitat of 520 species of birds and about 60 species of mammals. Many of them are endemics. The area has the largest number of Heliconia species in the world and a large numbers of species of orchids, mainly of the genera Cattleya, Odontoglossum, Miltonia, Phragmipedium and Peristeria. The natural forests typical of the area, such as the páramo, and the cloud forest, are decreasing progressively due to agricultural activities. As a result, many of the endemic species are threatened, endangered or critically endangered. Some of them are:

- Yellow-eared parrot
- Andean guan
- Colombian weasel
- Epicrionops columbianus (a caecilian)
- Mano de Oso tree.
