= La Tebaida =

Coordinates: 4°27′N 75°48′W

- Municipality and town
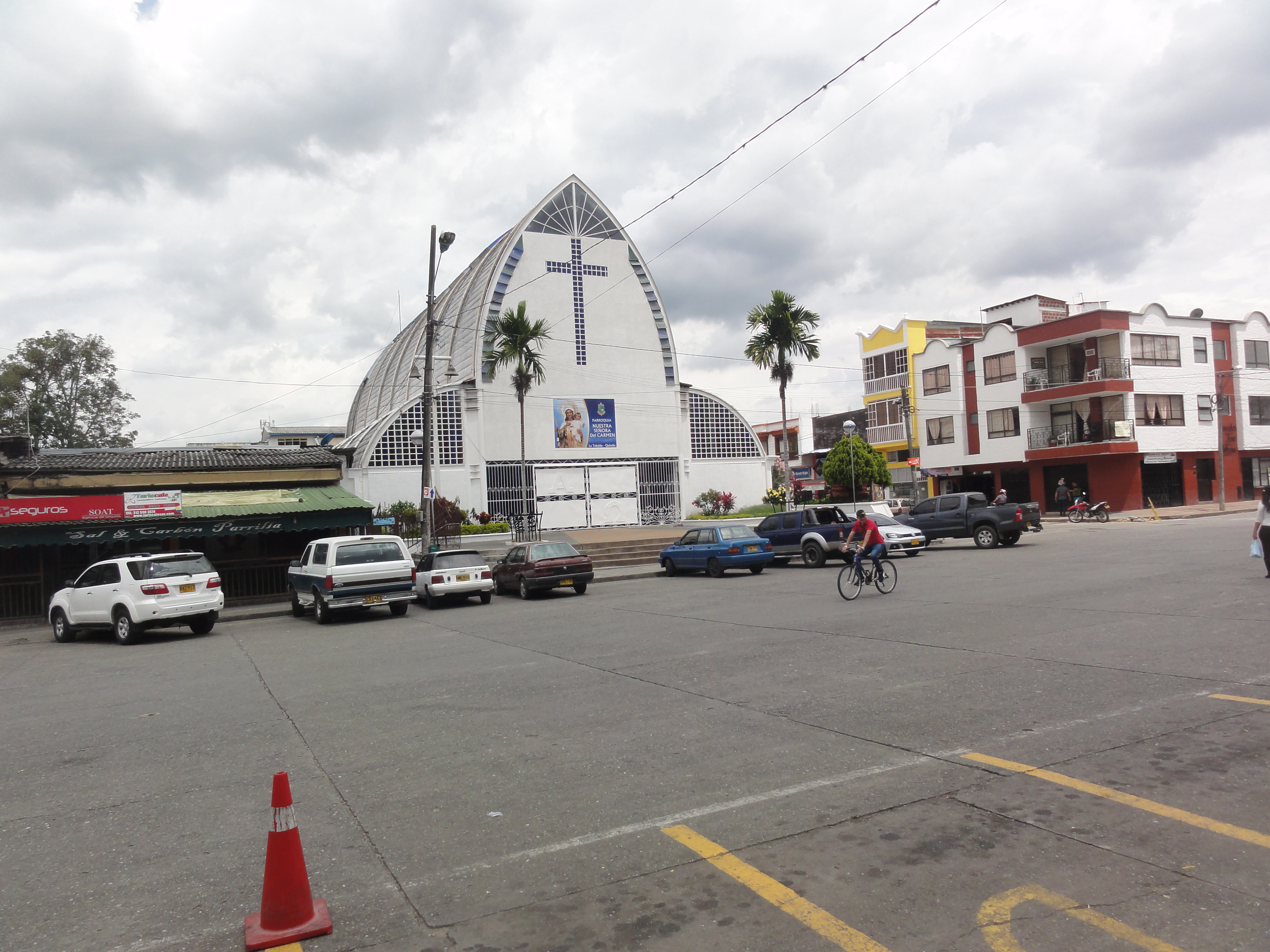
- Our Lady of Carmen Church

- Flag Coat of arms

- Location of the municipality and town of La Tebaida in the Quindío department of Colombia
- Country: Colombia
- Department: Quindío Department
- Founded: 14 August 1916
- Founder: Luís Arango Cardona

Government
  - Mayor: Rosa Patricia Buitrago Giraldo (2016-2019)

Area
  - Municipality and town: 89 km^{2} (34 sq mi)
- Elevation: 1,200 m (3,900 ft)

Population (2023)
  - Municipality and town: 35,010
  - Density: 390/km^{2} (1,000/sq mi)
  - Urban: 39,498
- Time zone: UTC-5 (Colombia Standard Time)
- Website: Official website

La Tebaida (Spanish pronunciation: [la teˈβajða]) is a municipality in the western part of the department of Quindío, Colombia. It's located 17 km southwest of the departmental capital Armenia.

== History ==
La Tebaida was founded by Luis Arango Cardona, born in Manizales, Caldas on February 19, 1879. He was one of the first people to undertake systematic archaeological studies of the indigenous tombs (guacas) in Quindío. His research led to the publication in 1924 of his two-volume book Recuerdos de la guaquería en el Quindío, the first study of its type in Colombia.

In 1899, Arango and his brother had started a farm with an area of 6.7 km^{2} in the south of Armenia. They named their farm La Tebaida, the name of a region in Egypt where Christian monks had sought solitude for contemplation and prayer. In order to increase the productivity of their land, they divided it into 10 hectare blocks. The brothers distributed these to approximately 60 families, who paid the owners with a proportion of their production.

Arango decided to set aside a portion of his farm so that all of the tenants could build their houses in a central location. He laid out a street plan including parks and the principal plaza, located one block from the main farm house. The sections went on sale on August 14, 1916, and is now considered the foundation date for the town. Within one week, 130 sections had been sold at a price of 20 pesos for each one. A competition was held to choose the name of the settlement. Although more than 1,000 names were suggested, the most popular choice was the original name of the farm.

In 1917 the settlement was elevated to the status of a corregimiento of Armenia. A census in that year showed there were 478 inhabitants (254 men and 224 women), including 45 married couples and 55 couples living together without being married.

The municipality of La Tebaida was created in 1953 with the separation of 85 km^{2} from Armenia. The first mayor of La Tebaida was Felipe Santiago Mejia. He helped this town get water.

== Climate ==
La Tebaida has an average annual temperature of 23 °C.

Climate data for La Tebaida (El Edén International Airport), elevation 1,229 m (4,032 ft), (1981–2010)
Month	Jan	Feb	Mar	Apr	May	Jun	Jul	Aug	Sep	Oct	Nov	Dec	Year
Mean daily maximum °C (°F)	27.8 (82.0)	28.0 (82.4)	27.9 (82.2)	27.5 (81.5)	27.3 (81.1)	27.4 (81.3)	27.9 (82.2)	28.3 (82.9)	27.7 (81.9)	27.1 (80.8)	26.9 (80.4)	27.2 (81.0)	27.6 (81.7)
Daily mean °C (°F)	22.2 (72.0)	22.4 (72.3)	22.2 (72.0)	22.0 (71.6)	22.0 (71.6)	22.2 (72.0)	22.4 (72.3)	22.6 (72.7)	22.0 (71.6)	21.5 (70.7)	21.5 (70.7)	21.9 (71.4)	22.1 (71.8)
Mean daily minimum °C (°F)	16.6 (61.9)	16.7 (62.1)	16.8 (62.2)	17.1 (62.8)	17.3 (63.1)	16.9 (62.4)	16.6 (61.9)	16.5 (61.7)	16.5 (61.7)	16.6 (61.9)	16.7 (62.1)	16.8 (62.2)	16.7 (62.1)
Average precipitation mm (inches)	136.1 (5.36)	144.2 (5.68)	194.1 (7.64)	262.6 (10.34)	219.6 (8.65)	153.1 (6.03)	105.2 (4.14)	95.6 (3.76)	182.9 (7.20)	249.7 (9.83)	264.1 (10.40)	175.2 (6.90)	2,164.7 (85.22)
Average precipitation days	13	13	16	20	20	15	13	12	17	21	20	16	190
Average relative humidity (%)	80	79	80	82	83	82	79	77	80	82	82	81	80
Mean monthly sunshine hours	170.5	146.8	139.5	126.0	127.1	138.0	176.7	189.1	150.0	136.4	135.0	148.8	1,783.9
Mean daily sunshine hours	5.5	5.2	4.5	4.2	4.1	4.6	5.7	6.1	5.0	4.4	4.5	4.8	4.9
Source: Instituto de Hidrologia Meteorologia y Estudios Ambientales
