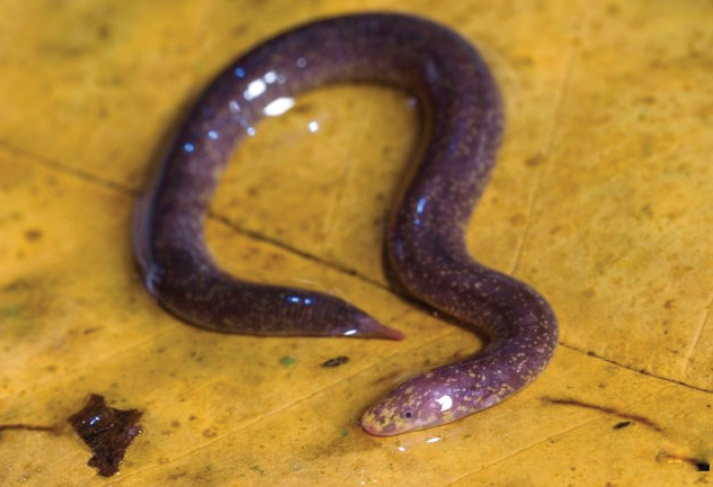
- Epicrionops sp.

Scientific classification
- Kingdom: Animalia
- Phylum: Chordata
- Class: Amphibia
- Order: Gymnophiona
- Clade: Apoda
- Family: Rhinatrematidae
- Genus: Epicrionops; Boulenger, 1883

= Epicrionops =

Genus of amphibians

Epicrionops is a genus of caecilians in the family Rhinatrematidae. Species in this genus are known from Colombia, Ecuador, Guyana and Peru, and are likely to occur in Venezuela and Brazil.

Species included (as of October 2019):

- Epicrionops bicolor Boulenger, 1883
- Epicrionops columbianus (Rendahl and Vestergren, 1939)
- Epicrionops lativittatus Taylor, 1968
- Epicrionops marmoratus Taylor, 1968
- Epicrionops parkeri (Dunn, 1942)
- Epicrionops peruvianus (Boulenger, 1902)
- Epicrionops petersi Taylor, 1968
