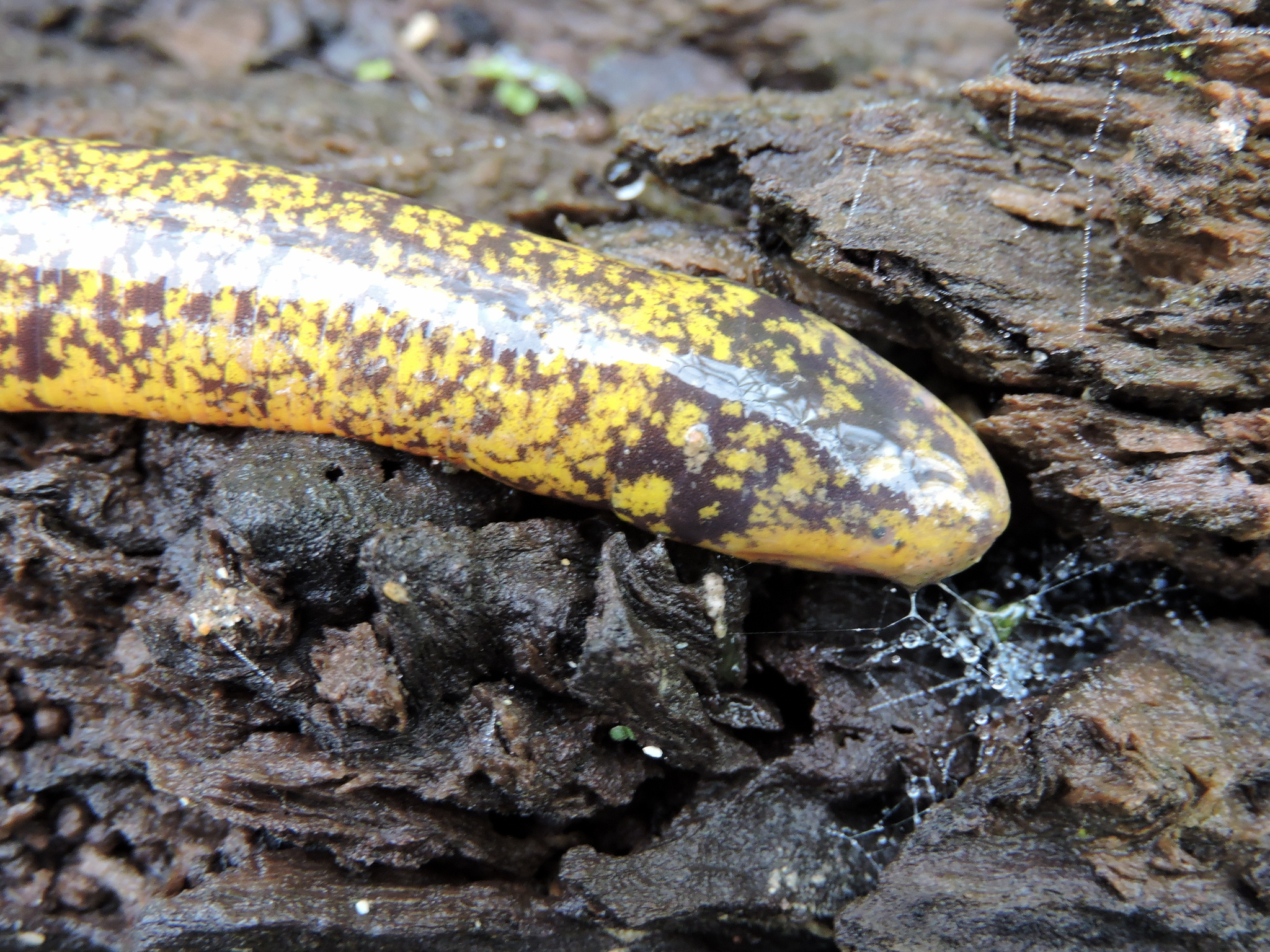

Conservation status
- Least Concern (IUCN 3.1)

Scientific classification
- Kingdom: Animalia
- Phylum: Chordata
- Class: Amphibia
- Order: Gymnophiona
- Clade: Apoda
- Family: Rhinatrematidae
- Genus: Epicrionops
- Species: E. bicolor

Binomial name
- Epicrionops bicolor Boulenger, 1883
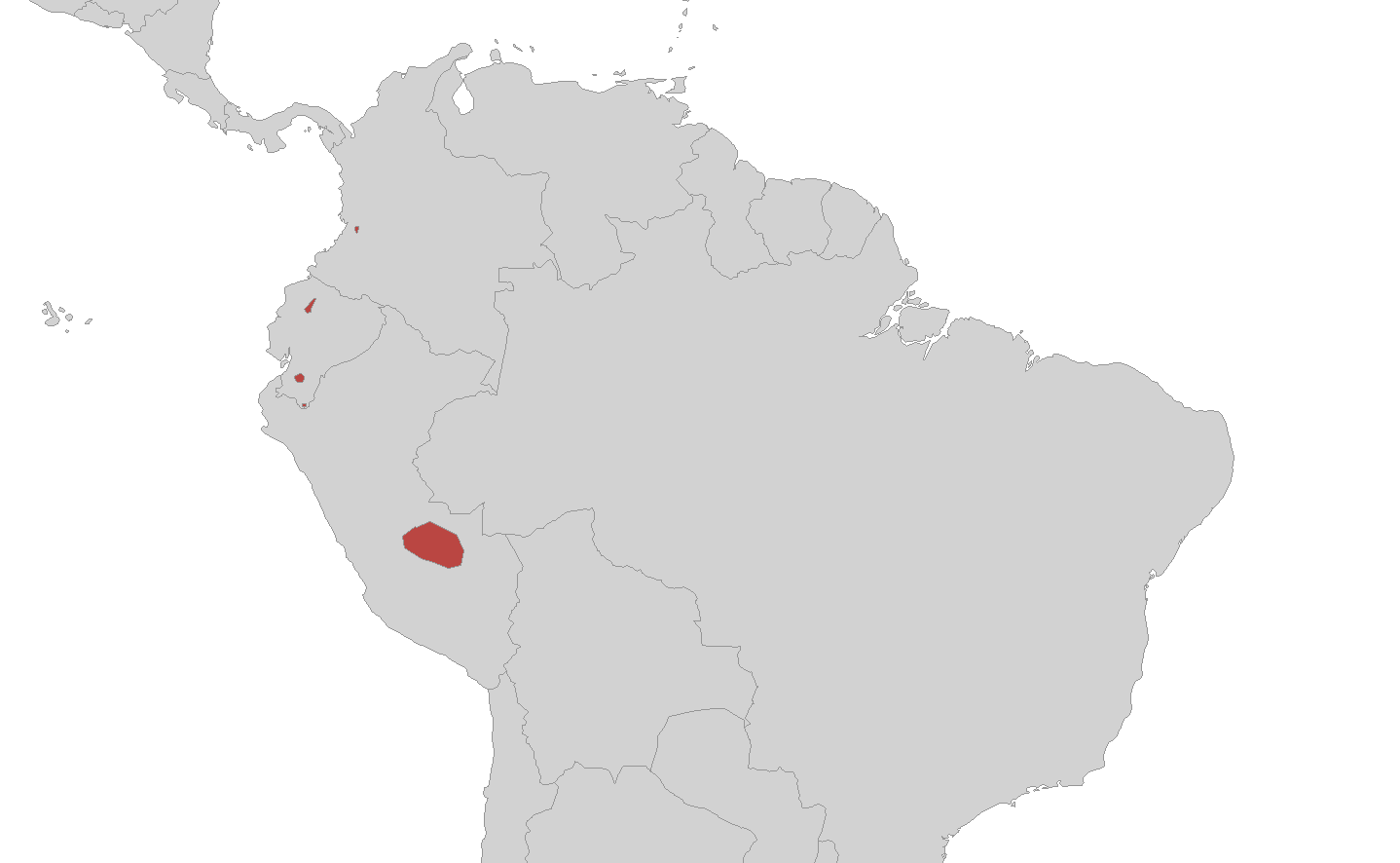
- Epicrionops bicolor range

= Two-coloured caecilian =

Species of amphibian

The two-coloured caecilian (Epicrionops bicolor) is a species of caecilian in the family Rhinatrematidae found in Colombia, Ecuador, and Peru. Its natural habitats are subtropical or tropical moist montane forests, rivers, and intermittent rivers.
