= Incilius melanochlorus =

Conservation status
- Least Concern (IUCN 3.1)

Scientific classification
- Kingdom: Animalia
- Phylum: Chordata
- Class: Amphibia
- Order: Anura
- Family: Bufonidae
- Genus: Incilius
- Species: I. melanochlorus

Binomial name
- Incilius melanochlorus (Cope, 1877)

Synonyms
- Bufo valliceps var. Cope, 1875; Bufo melanochlorus Cope, 1877; Bufo melanochloris (Cope, 1877), lapsus Cranopsis melanochlorus (Cope, 1877); Ollotis melanochlorus (Cope, 1877)

Species of Central American toad in the family Bufonidae

Incilius melanochlorus, formerly Bufo melanochlorus, is a mid-sized species of toad with a crested head in the family Bufonidae. It is primarily distinguished by its very long first finger with respect to the other fingers. It is found in southern Nicaragua, in the northern Cordillera Central (central highlands) and on the Atlantic slopes of eastern Costa Rica, and in western Panama.

== Vernacular names ==
Frank and Ramus (1995) give it the common name dark green toad, Panamanian herpetologists Jaramillo and Ibáñez (2009) use wet forest toad or west forest toad according to Darrel R. Frost (likely a misspelling). A local Spanish name from Costa Rica specifically for this species is sapo Costaricense de la selva, but it also just known as sapo.

== Taxonomy ==
The first article about this species was published in 1875 by Edward Drinker Cope who wrote of the toad as a particular but unnamed variety of Bufo valliceps from eastern Costa Rica. It was described as a novel species in its own right in 1877 by Cope under the name B. melanochlorus. The holotype is a specimen (undesignated in Cope's original publication, but thought to be USNM30592) taken in Limón Province sometime before 1877 by W. W. Gabb. The specific epithet melanochlorus is compounded from the Ancient Greek μελανω (melanō), meaning "blackened" and χλωρός (khlōrós) meaning "(yellowish) green". The English name invented by Frank and Ramus is thus a simple transliteration.

In 2004 O'Neill and Mendelson moved this species from Bufo to Incilius, and while doing so split the taxon into two species, a western I. aucoinae and the nominate taxon. Earlier publications use Bufo melanochlorus. In 2006 Darrel Frost et al. moved the species to the old genus Cranopsis originally erected by Cope in 1875 with C. fastidiosus as the type species. It was controversial and this approach was not followed by everyone. It subsequently necessitated moving Cranopsis toads to the new genus Cranophryne as the genus name Cranopsis proved to have already been used by Adams to describe a mollusc in 1860. In 2009 Pauly et al. suggested that because the recent partitioning of Bufo had made the formerly monophyletic genus paraphyletic and that the new genera were too imperfectly defined to be phylogeneticly stable, as the large number of recent (officially mandated) name changes caused by Frost in 2006 was evidencing, and that the hitherto done genetic analyses were yet too vague to properly resolve relationships, thus Incilius should be treated as a subgenus of Bufo. Frost refuted these criticisms in a 2009 response. A phylogenetic analysis by Mendelson based on morphology, life history, and molecular data was published 2011 which recommending sinking Cranopsis/Cranophryne, Ollotis and Crepidius/Crepidophryne back into Incilius.

Mendelson et al. (2011) suggest that this species is part of an I. valliceps species group, or more specifically in what they termed the "Forest Group" subgroup, including the taxa I. aucoinae, I. cavifrons, I. campbelli, I. cristatus, I. leucomoyos, I. macrocristatus, I. spiculatus and I. tutelarius.

== Description ==
Incilius melanochlorus are moderately large toads, with males attaining 65 mm (2.6 in) to 74 mm (2.9 in) in snout–vent length, and females 103 mm (4.1 in) to 107 mm (4.2 in). There is marked sexual dimorphism, the females having more irregular dark colouration on their back and being larger, but the males having longer heads and more brawny forearms.

The head is wider than it is long. The head is crested, with the cranium sporting well-developed, thin and high crests. This crest ornamentation consists of canthal, supraorbital, and postpreorbital crests, and parietal crests with transverse folds between them (other species have crests on other locations). The crests run from the nostril, behind the eye, to the back of the head. The skin of the top of the head is hardened and stuck to the top of the skull. Males have a vocal sac. The vocal slits which hide the vocal sac inside the throat are small and bilateral, the sac has a single lobe, and is large, heavily pigmented with a greenish cast, and when calling inflates fully to a round shape. The eyes are large with a coppery bronze iris and a black pupil, the top half of the iris lighter than the bottom half, with a thin, dark line separating the two halves. The tongue is long and thin. The paratoid glands are small, smaller than the upper eyelid, and triangular in shape, and the toad has a small tympanum.

The hind legs are relatively short, as are the feet and the tibia, but the toes are long and have some webbing between them. The first finger is longer than the second. The fingers and toes have tubercles underneath them. Sometimes the tips of the fingers and toes are lighter-coloured, sometimes the same colour as the rest of the digit. The tarsus (heel) has two differently-shaped tubercles, one facing inwards, the other outwards.

The dorsum (back) is very warty, but is covered in a smooth skin except near the shoulders and hips, which has small, low and rounded protrusions. The ventral side has a minutely roughened surface. The lateral side of the toad is bordered along the upper part with a row of light-coloured, low to medium-sized, sharp but rounded, spine-shaped warts extending from the paratoid gland to the groin. The upper surface of the hind limbs is covered in many large, pointed warts.

In general the colour of this toad is brown or grey, mottled with irregular splotches of dark gray or black. There is a thin or thick, lighter coloured, mid-dorsal stripe down the back. The dorsal colouration is light brown, often with lighter brown or pale grey bands toward the sides of the back. In females and juveniles the dorsum has darker brown mottling. The sides are dark, with a broad, dark stripe below the row of lateral warts. The ventral surface has a yellowish base, while the throat and chest are black, and the underside of the lower jaw has white spots along the edge. The eyes have a tan-coloured, square-shaped patch below them, reaching to the lip. There is a mottled dark brown region from the eye to the edge of the paratoid gland, which appears somewhat like a mask. The legs are mottled with light and dark brown, with dark bars on the upper surface of the thighs. The juvenile is somewhat more brightly coloured.

=== Call ===
The call is a "short trill" with toads having a round, inflated vocal sac. The call is several seconds long, and is repeated several times, with the intervals between each trill lasting a few seconds.

=== Similar species ===
In the field it is most similar to Incilius coniferus, being most easily told apart by the length of the first finger of the hand being nearly as long as the third, longest finger in the species, whereas in I. coniferus the first finger is shorter. Incilius aucoinae is very similar, but males of that species are smaller, and this species has a black chest and throat, mottling on the flanks, transverse folds between parietal crests, cranial crests that are heightened vertically, and distinct pretympanic and preorbital crests.

According to Jay M. Savage (2002) the call is similar to I. luetkenii or I. valliceps.

== Distribution ==
In the 1960s the range was considered to include Nicaragua, but in 1972 Villa stated all earlier collections from this country were to be considered misidentified specimens of Incilius luetkenii or I. valliceps. It was subsequently believed to be endemic to Costa Rica. In 2004 similar toads from the Pacific slopes of Costa Rica were reassigned to a new species, I. aucoinae.

In Costa Rica it occurs throughout the northern section of the Cordillera Central at mid-latitudes, and throughout the Cordillera de Talamanca and the eastern Caribbean seaboard. As of 2008 it is unclear if I. melanochlorus also occurs on the Pacific slopes of Costa Rica, or if those are misidentified I. aucoinae. McDiarmid and Savage recorded it in 2005 in meadows of the Peninsula de Osa, extending the distribution to the Pacific slopes in the far southwest of the country. According to Pounds et al. in 1997, it disappeared from Monteverde, Costa Rica, in the late 1980s and then reappeared there in the 1990s.

In 2004 the toad was recorded in Nicaragua for first time (correctly) in the Indio Maíz Biological Reserve by Gunther Köhler and his team, in 2009 it was also recorded from Río San Juan under auspices of an expedition by Köhler and in 2014 it was reported in Rivas Department on the Pacific coast by a Nicaraguan team. In 2009 the distribution was extended to Panama following Jaramillo and Ibáñez (2009).

== Ecology ==
This toad is nocturnal and insectivorous. The toads may become more active during light rain showers.

=== Habitat ===
The native habitats of this species are wet lowland rainforests and the lower premontane wet forests at elevations to about 1,080 m (3,540 ft) asl. Its favourite locations are near large streams and at the edges of forests. In the northeastern rainforests of Costa Rica it occurs from sea level to 2,000 m (6,600 ft) in elevation, with frogs of the genus Eleutherodactylus being the few amphibians to occur at higher altitudes here. It is occasionally found amongst the leaf litter on the forest floor.

=== Reproduction ===
Reproduction happens during the dry season starting with the males calling from January to February from pools along rocky streams, or within 50 cm (20 in) of water. Males may call at odd times of the year. Males develop dark-brown nuptial pads on their first and second fingers during breeding season. Although some sources claim breeding (amplexus) takes place in large streams, according to Savage (2002) it occurs in small, somewhat rocky-bottomed streams which are at low water for the season.

=== Interspecific relationships ===
Male toads may share their pools with the larger Bufo marinus toads.

=== Diseases ===
The pathogenic fungus Batrachochytrium dendrobatidis has had no impact on this toad.

== Conservation ==
When the species had been less studied, earlier authors such as Bolaños & Chaves writing for the IUCN in 2004 mistakenly believed it to be endemic to Costa Rica. As such it was automatically added to the local Red List and considered threatened. It was described in 2004 as most likely not very tolerant of deforestation and siltation and pollution of its breeding habitat, but nonetheless it was downgraded to "least concern" in 2004. As of 2008 the IUCN describes it as "widespread and regularly encountered" and "common and somewhat adaptable with a presumed large population". It is regularly seen during the breeding period, and is common in wet forests at higher elevations at favoured habitats. It occurs at La Selva Biological Station, in the Monteverde Cloud Forest Reserve (if correctly identified) and throughout the Maquenque National Wildlife Refuge in Costa Rica, and in the Indio Maíz Biological Reserve and Río San Juan Wildlife Refuge in Nicaragua. It is kept in an ex situ collection at the Costa Rican Amphibian Research Center.
