= Incilius ibarrai =

Conservation status
- Least Concern (IUCN 3.1)

Scientific classification
- Kingdom: Animalia
- Phylum: Chordata
- Class: Amphibia
- Order: Anura
- Family: Bufonidae
- Genus: Incilius
- Species: I. ibarrai

Binomial name
- Incilius ibarrai (Stuart, 1954)

Synonyms
- Bufo ibarrai Stuart, 1954; Cranopsis ibarrai (Stuart, 1954); Ollotis ibarrai (Stuart, 1954)

Species of amphibian

Incilius ibarrai (common name: Jalapa toad) is a species of toad in the family Bufonidae. It is found in the central and southern highlands of Guatemala and adjacent Honduras. The specific name ibarrai honors Jorge Alfonso Ibarra (1921–2000), then-director of the Guatemalan National Natural History Museum.

== Systematics ==
Incilius ibarrai belongs to the monophyletic Incilius coccifer group, which, in addition to the said species, includes Incilius cycladen, Incilius pisinnus, Incilius porteri, and Incilius signifer.

== Description ==
Adult males measure 43–82 mm (1.7–3.2 in) and adult females 61–94 mm (2.4–3.7 in) in snout–vent length. The snout is weakly pointed in dorsal view and rounded laterally. The cranial crests are well-developed, while the parietal crests are low. The supra-tympanic crest is large and bulbous; the tympanum is visible. The parotoid glands are large. The toes are one-half to one-third webbed. Preserved specimens are pale yellowish gray mid-dorsally, becoming more yellow laterally and gradually shading into pale yellow ventrally.

== Habitat and conservation ==
Incilius ibarrai occurs in pine-oak, premontane, and lower montane moist forests at elevations of 1,360–2,020 m (4,460–6,630 ft) above sea level. It breeds in ponds, marshes, and wet meadows. It is threatened by habitat loss. Chytridiomycosis is also as a possible threat, and may have caused the decline of some formerly robust populations, e.g., in the Sierra de las Minas biosphere reserve.
