= Large-crested toad =

Large-crested toad is a common name for several amphibians and may refer to:

- Incilius cristatus, native to Puebla and Veracruz in Mexico
- Incilius macrocristatus, native to Guatemala and Chiapas in Mexico
