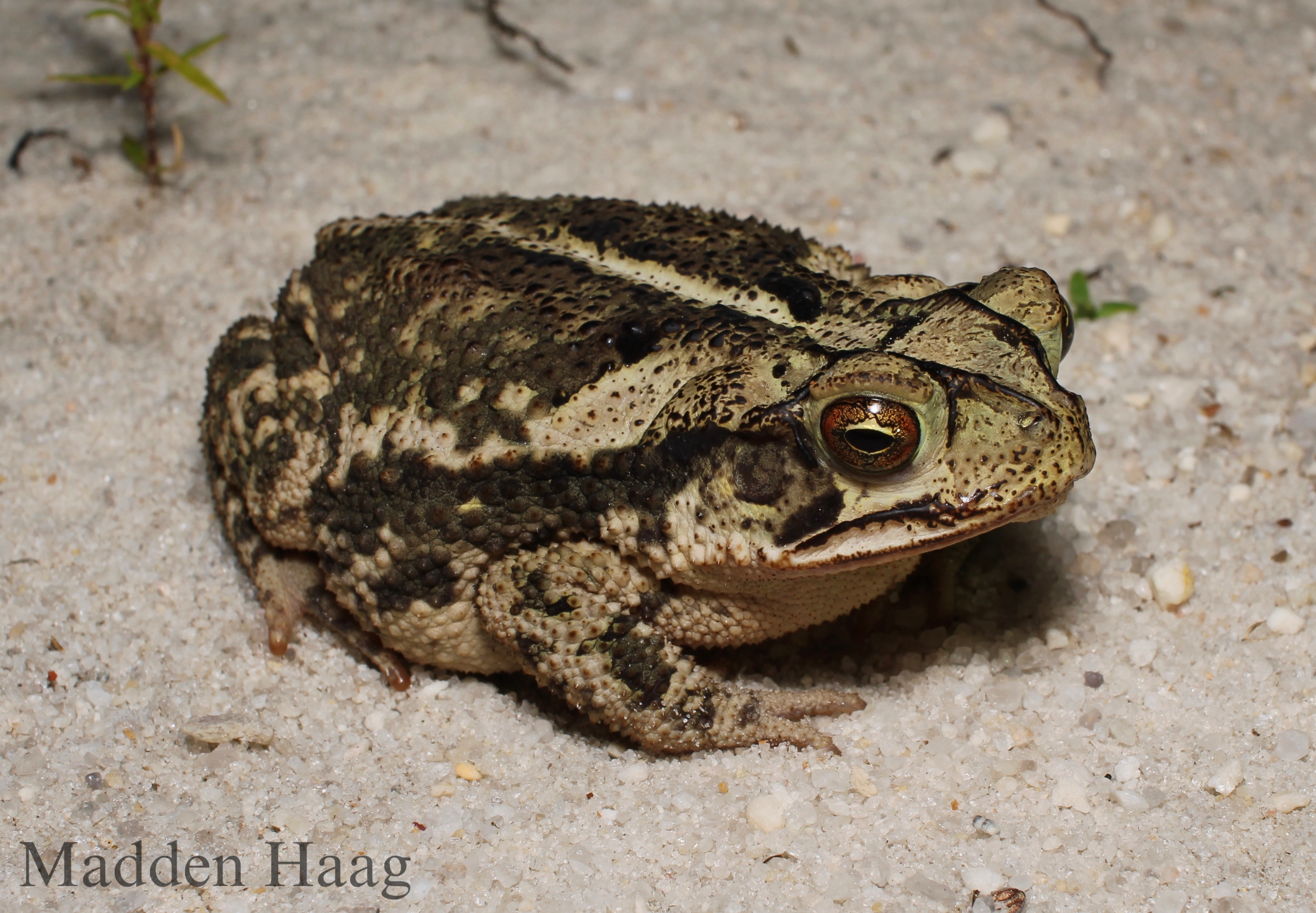
- This toad was found in an isolated Florida population.

Conservation status
- Least Concern (IUCN 3.1)

Scientific classification
- Kingdom: Animalia
- Phylum: Chordata
- Class: Amphibia
- Order: Anura
- Family: Bufonidae
- Genus: Incilius
- Species: I. nebulifer

Binomial name
- Incilius nebulifer (Girard, 1854)

Synonyms
- Bufo granulosus Baird and Girard, 1852 (preoccupied by Bufo globulosus Spix, 1824); Bufo nebulifer Girard, 1854; Cranopsis nebulifer (Girard, 1854)

= Incilius nebulifer =

Species of amphibian

Incilius nebulifer, also known as the coastal plains toad or Gulf coast toad, is a species of toad in the family Bufonidae. It is found on the coast of Gulf of Mexico from Veracruz in Mexico to Mississippi in the United States. It was removed from the synonymy of Incilius valliceps in 2000. It occurs in a wide range of habitats, both natural and human-altered: coastal prairies, barrier beaches, towns, etc. Breeding takes place in various kinds of pools, including roadside and irrigation ditches. This widespread and common toad is not threatened.

== Photos ==
Reference photos
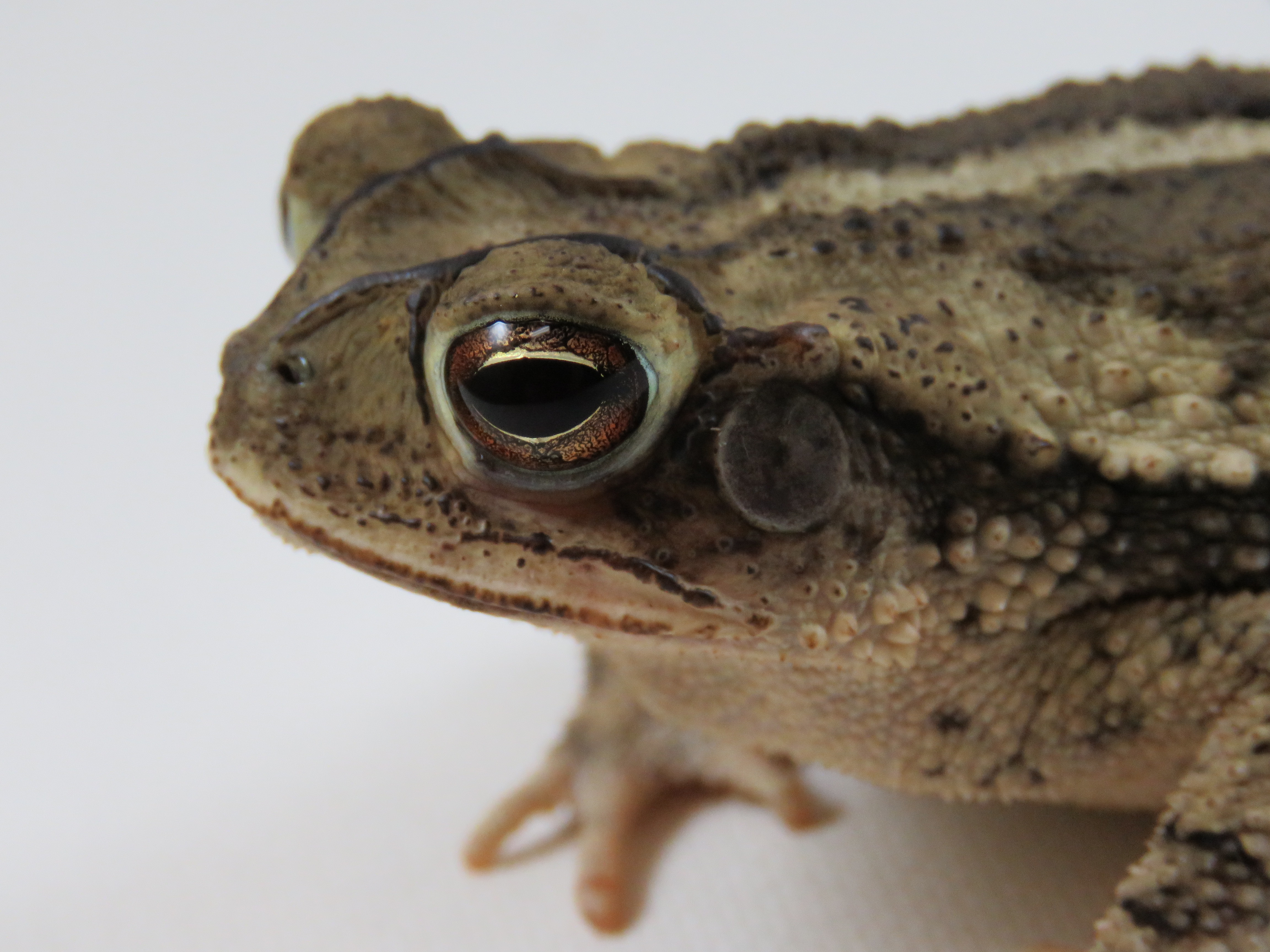
Coastal plains toad, head details

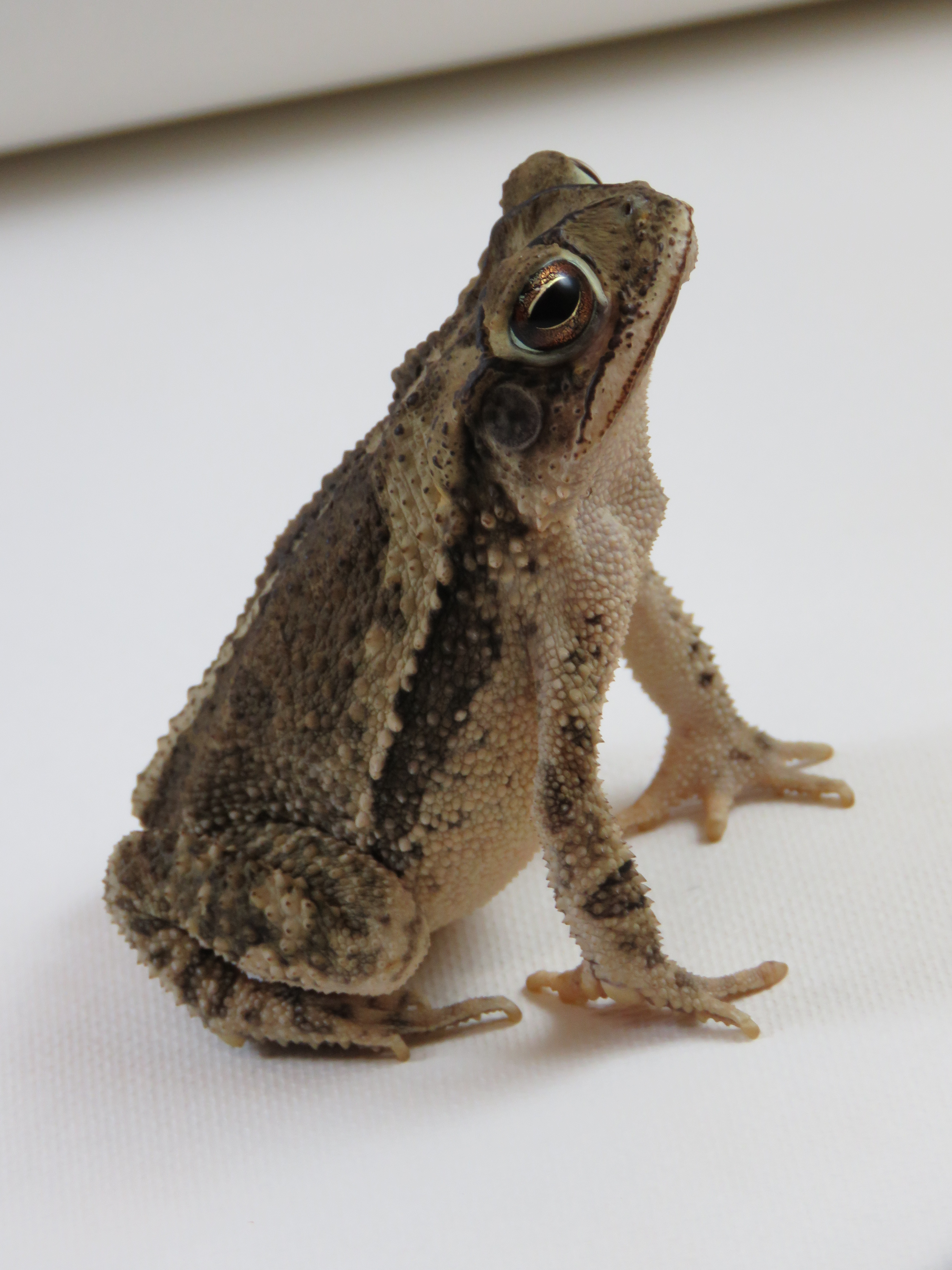
Coastal plains toad, lateral view

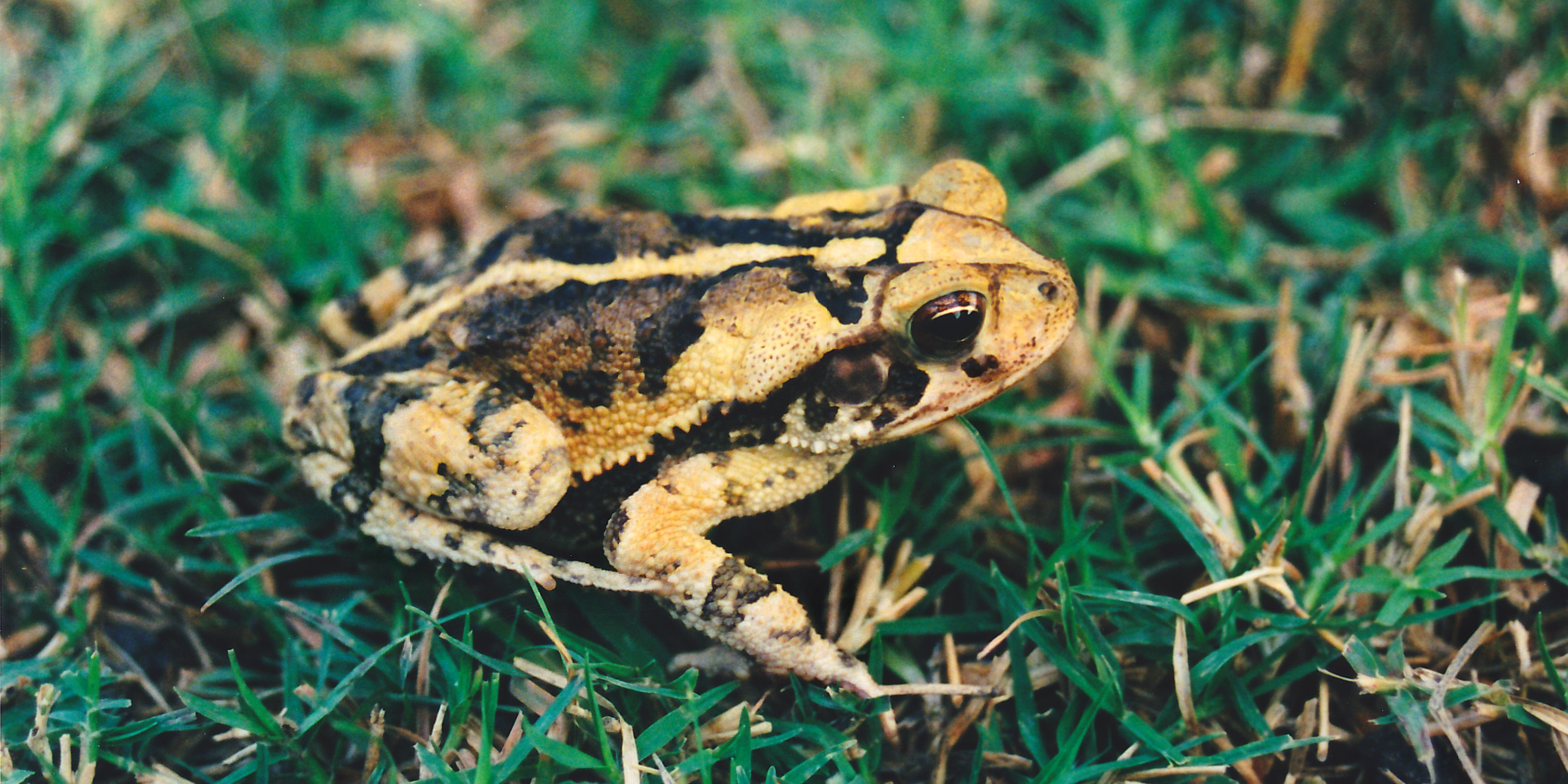
Gulf Coast Toad (Incilius nebulifer), Municipality of Soto La Marina, Tamaulipas, Mexico (17 May 2002).
