= Holdridge's toad =

Conservation status
- Critically Endangered (IUCN 3.1)

Scientific classification
- Kingdom: Animalia
- Phylum: Chordata
- Class: Amphibia
- Order: Anura
- Family: Bufonidae
- Genus: Incilius
- Species: I. holdridgei

Binomial name
- Incilius holdridgei (Taylor, 1952)

Synonyms
- Bufo holdridgei Taylor, 1952; Cranopsis holdridgei (Taylor, 1952)

Species of amphibian

Holdridge's toad (Incilius holdridgei), formerly Bufo holdridgei, is a species of toad endemic to Costa Rica. In October 2008, it was declared extinct by the International Union for Conservation of Nature because the species had not been seen since 1987, despite years of extensive searches. However, the species was rediscovered in 2010 by a Costa Rican herpetologist, and is now classified as critically endangered. The greatest conservation threat to the species is the presence of chytrid fungus in its habitat.

== Taxonomy ==
The species name holdridgei is in honour of Dr. Leslie Holdridge who assisted Dr. Edward Taylor during the expedition where the species was first described. It can be distinguished in classification from other toads by its morphological differences. For example, I. holdridgei differs from Incilius fastidiosus because of the different cranial crests and from Incilius peripetates due to the different sizes at the adult age.

== Description ==
The adult male is between 32 and 46 mm snout vent length (SVL). The adult female is slightly larger, measuring between 38 and 53 mm SVL.

Both the male and female have similar dorsum coloration ranging from black to light brown with a lighter colored venter. The limbs, as well as the dorsal and lateral surfaces are spotted with reddish warts of varying sizes. The head is broad with low crests, excluding the thicker supratympanic crest. The reddish colored parotoid gland is smooth and globular. Limbs are shortened and feature fleshy hands and feet that are moderately webbed and lack tubercles.

Both males and females of the species lack structures of the ear, causing deafness. Males lack vocal slits and sac, and have unusually hypertrophied testes.

Incilius holdridgei tadpoles are small in size with ovoid-shaped bodies that are dark brown in color and feature a lighter venter surface. The tail and caudal fins are rounded. The mouth is directed ventrally and the oral disc has beaks and 2 to 3 rows of denticles which are bordered by a row of large papillae.

== Habitat ==
Originally found on Barva Volcano in Cordillera Central, Costa Rica, the Holdridge's toad is still endemic to that small area of Costa Rica's montane rainforests. They occur in an elevation range of 1,900 to 2,200 m (6,200 to 7,200 ft). Holdridge's toads have been mainly observed in the rainforests of the Central Mountain Range of Costa Rica. The species has recently been found living in open grassy areas. This class of toads settles below the leaf litter inside the forest during the duration of excessive rainfall. They are classified as a fossorial species due to the act of digging or burrowing themselves. They favor mossy stream banks.

== Behavior ==
Incilius holdridgei are fossorial, and remain relatively inactive while burrowed underground. During seasons of heavy rain, they can be found underneath layers of forest floor debris. During dryer periods, they can be found near stream banks. Members of the species become more active during the daytime when they are above ground or crepuscular time. Due to their morphology, Incilius holdridgei are deaf and mute; they apparently do not communicate through sound or have mating calls- a rarity among frogs and toads. Before 1986, the species had been relatively easy to spot during its two-month mating season from April to May when males and females became more active and gathered in the hundreds. However, outside of the mating season, the toads were very difficult to locate.

=== Diet ===
The Holdridge's toads' diet includes a broad range of arthropod invertebrates, among them spiders, larval stages of moths and butterflies (lepidopterans), flies, beetles, earwigs (dermoptera), ants, and mites.

=== Reproduction ===
The average age for sexual maturity of Incilius holdridgei is about three years. Due to the lack of development of vocal slits and tympana Incilius holdridgei do not have a breeding call. This species is an explosive breeder that lays clutches of large eggs in pools of water on the forest floor, they are also known to lay eggs in man-made drainage ditches. Historically however, Incilius holdridgei were known to breed in more open areas such as pastures, and due to habitat conservation efforts these pastures are now evolving back into forests. The males are known to arrive to these breeding pools following periods of heavy rain around early to mid-April and wait for the arrival of the females. At one time there were so many of them that some of the toads would try to mate with other species during these mating frenzies. It is also believed that the females only stay at the breeding pool for about only an hour or so.

Egg clutches range from 45 to 137 eggs. Hatching occurs after 12 days and metamorphosis after another 27 days. After hatching, larval concentrations are small due to the small bodies of water they are laid in.

== History ==
Holdridge's toad was declared extinct in 2008 because it had not been observed since 1986. Between 1968 and 2009 there were no sightings of Holdridge's toad in their natural environment. Extensive searches were led to determine if the species was extinct. The searches lasted for seven years before the toad was declared extinct.

From 2008 to 2010, there was extensive searching efforts for the species. In 2009, tadpole and adult toads were discovered in two separate ponds that reclassified the species as critically endangered. The search suggested that the adult population is less than 50 mature individuals, leading to its listing as Critically Endangered. Juveniles were found, indicating relatively recent reproductive activity, but no large aggregations were seen; this species is considered Critically Endangered.

Multiple causes are believed to have led to the toad's presumed extinction, including chytridiomycosis, climate change, and deforestation. The main threat to Holdridge's toad is thought to be chytridiomycosis, a fungal pathogen, Batrachochytrium dendrobatidis, that causes an infections disease in amphibians. The fungus keratinizes any keratin-containing skin layers in both the tadpoles and adult frogs. High levels of this fungus were detected in the breeding grounds of Holdridge's toad before and after the species was presumed extinct.

Another proposed threat to I. holdridgei is predation. Samples of populations record a high percentage of toads with partially or entirely missing limbs.

=== Conservation efforts ===
The toad was added to the Red List of Endangered Species in 2006. Of the forty recorded visits, Holdridge's toad has been observed on twenty-two occasions, accounting for sixty-seven organisms. Much of the known range of this species is protected in Parque Nacional Braulio Carrillo, 20 km north-east of the capital of San José. However, breeding ponds in Alto El Roble are near the main road and may be under threat from increasing tourism. The two sites where the species is known to persist in 2010 are located in the Cerro Dantos and Jaguarundi Refuges, neither of which has the same protection status as a national park. Even with the lower protection status, the forest cover of these refuges remains intact and seemingly not threatened.

A monitoring project is being carried by the Foundation Mohamed Bin Zayed Species Conservation Fund.
