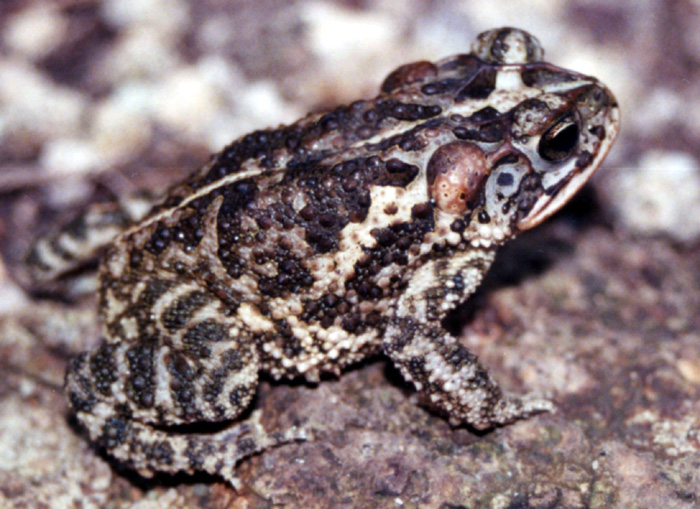

Conservation status
- Least Concern (IUCN 3.1)

Scientific classification
- Kingdom: Animalia
- Phylum: Chordata
- Class: Amphibia
- Order: Anura
- Family: Bufonidae
- Genus: Incilius
- Species: I. coccifer

Binomial name
- Incilius coccifer (Cope, 1866)

Synonyms
- Bufo coccifer Cope, 1866; Cranopsis coccifer (Cope, 1866); Bufo valliceps var. microtis Werner, 1896

= Incilius coccifer =

Species of amphibian

Incilius coccifer (common name: southern round-gland toad or southern roundgland toad) is a species of toad in the family Bufonidae. It is found in southern Mexico and southeastward in the Central America through Guatemala, El Salvador, Honduras, and Nicaragua to northwestern Costa Rica. Several species that were formerly included in this species have been named as distinct species: Incilius porteri, Incilius ibarrai, Incilius pisinnus, and Incilius signifer. Its natural habitats are lowland dry and moist forests, and it occurs also in disturbed areas such as pastures, roadside ditches, gardens, and vacant lots in urban areas. It is an abundant and widespread species that is not facing significant threats.
