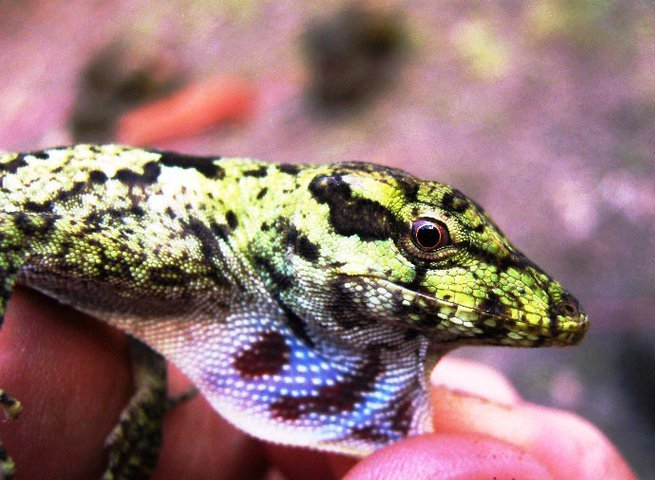

Conservation status
- Near Threatened (IUCN 3.1)

Scientific classification
- Kingdom: Animalia
- Phylum: Chordata
- Class: Reptilia
- Order: Squamata
- Suborder: Iguania
- Family: Anolidae
- Genus: Anolis
- Species: A. petersii

Binomial name
- Anolis petersii Bocourt, 1873

Synonyms
- Norops petersii (Bocourt, 1873)

= Anolis petersii =

Species of lizard

Anolis petersii, also known commonly as Peters's anole and el abaniquillo de Peters in New World Spanish, is a species of lizard in the family Anolidae. The species is native to Guatemala, Honduras, and Mexico.

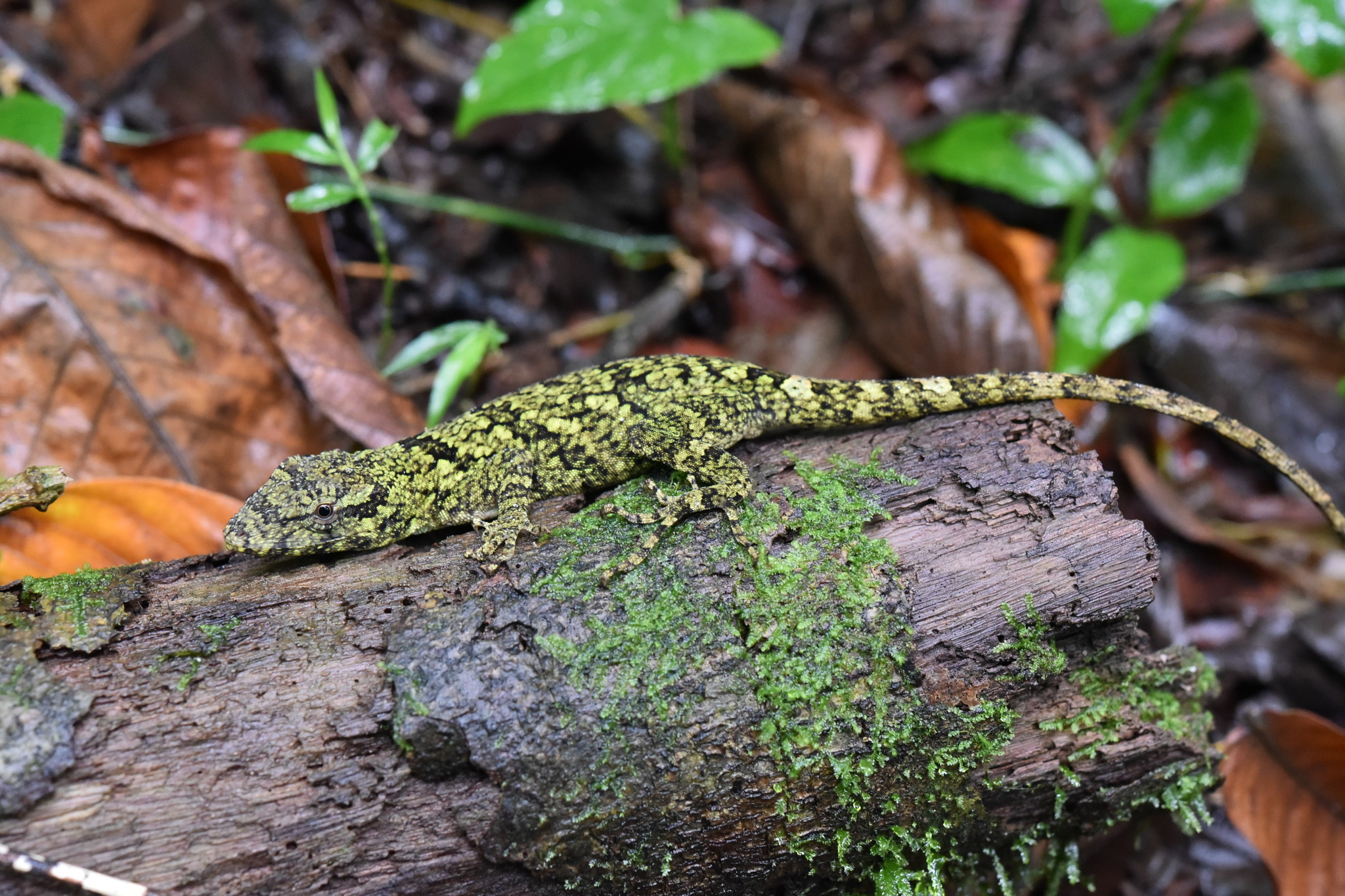
Peters' anole

== Etymology ==
The specific name, petersii, is in honor of German Herpetologist Wilhelm Peters.

== Habitat ==
The preferred natural habitat of Anolis petersii is forest, at elevations of 200–2,130 m (660–6,990 ft).

== Behavior ==
Anolis petersii is terrestrial, foraging on the forest floor, especially near streams.

== Reproduction ==
Anolis petersii is oviparous.
