= Incilius chompipe =

Conservation status
- Endangered (IUCN 3.1)

Scientific classification
- Kingdom: Animalia
- Phylum: Chordata
- Class: Amphibia
- Order: Anura
- Family: Bufonidae
- Genus: Incilius
- Species: I. chompipe

Binomial name
- Incilius chompipe (Vaughan and Mendelson, 2007)

Synonyms
- Crepidophryne chompipe Vaughan and Mendelson, 2007

Species of amphibian

Incilius chompipe is a species of toads in the family Bufonidae, known from several localities near Cascajal in the Cerro Chompipe and in the Reserva Dantas, both in the Cordillera Central of Costa Rica.

== Description ==
Males measure 22.5–27.3 mm (0.89–1.07 in) and females, based on a single specimen, 33.5 mm (1.32 in) in snout–vent length. The body is robust. The head bears canthal, supraorbital, supratympanic, and parietal crests, and the snout is acutely pointed. Parotoid glands are triangular and barely evident. Dorsal skin is, except for the nearly smooth mid-dorsum, roughened with numerous distinctly raised, rounded or pointed tubercles.

Skin secretions of Incilius chompipe can inflict notable irritation to human eyes.

== Habitat and conservation ==
Its natural habitats are primary and mature cloud forests with a closed canopy at elevations of 1,400–2,050 m (4,590–6,730 ft) asl. It seems to thrive in deep leaf litter.

It occurs on two protected areas.
