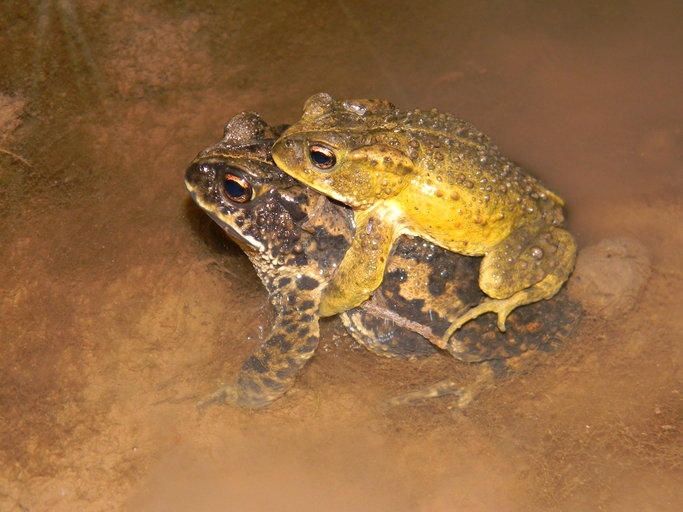
- Male and female in amplexus

Conservation status
- Least Concern (IUCN 3.1)

Scientific classification
- Kingdom: Animalia
- Phylum: Chordata
- Class: Amphibia
- Order: Anura
- Family: Bufonidae
- Genus: Incilius
- Species: I. bocourti

Binomial name
- Incilius bocourti (Brocchi, 1877)

Synonyms
- Bufo bocourti Brocchi, 1877; Cranopsis bocourti (Brocchi, 1877); Ollotis bocourti (Brocchi, 1877)

= Incilius bocourti =

Species of amphibian

Incilius bocourti (formerly Bufo bocourti; common name Bocourt's toad) is a species of toad in the family Bufonidae. The species is found in southwestern Guatemala and in adjacent Mexico in the state of Chiapas. Its phylogenetic position is uncertain. It may not to belong to the genus Incilius, but rather to the sister taxon Anaxyrus instead. It is named after Marie Firmin Bocourt, a French zoologist and artist.

== Habitat ==
The natural habitats of Incilius bocourti are coniferous highlands, but it can also occur heavily disturbed, treeless areas.

== Reproduction ==
Breeding of Incilius bocourti takes place in temporary ponds.

== Conservation status ==
There are no major threats to Incilius bocourti.
