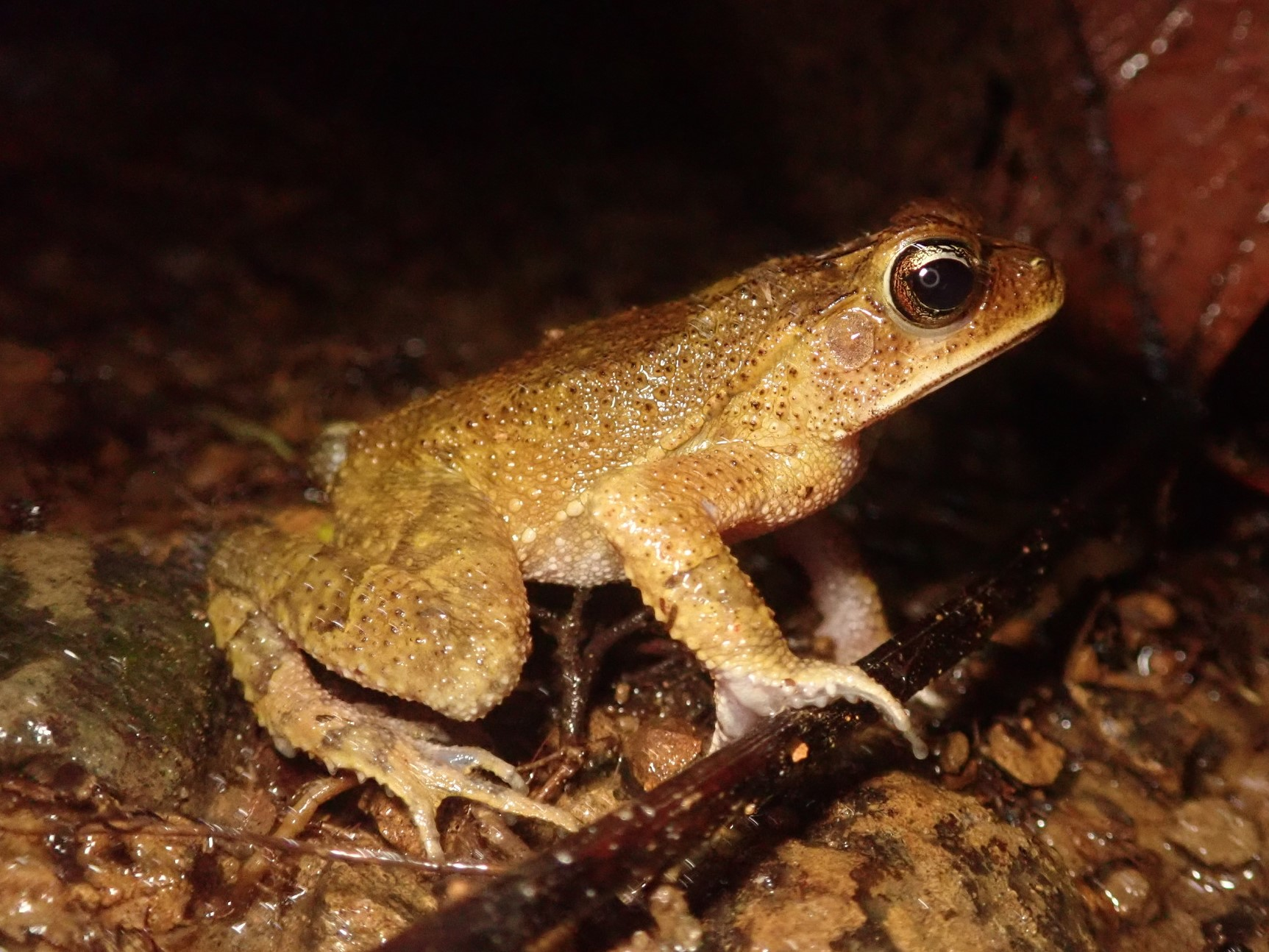

Conservation status
- Least Concern (IUCN 3.1)

Scientific classification
- Kingdom: Animalia
- Phylum: Chordata
- Class: Amphibia
- Order: Anura
- Family: Bufonidae
- Genus: Incilius
- Species: I. aucoinae

Binomial name
- Incilius aucoinae (O'Neill and Mendelson, 2004)

Synonyms
- Bufo aucoinae O'Neill and Mendelson, 2004; Cranopsis aucoinae (O'Neill and Mendelson, 2004)

= Incilius aucoinae =

Species of amphibian

Incilius aucoinae is a species of toads in the family Bufonidae. It is found in south-western Costa Rica and adjacent western Panama. Before its description in 2004, it was confused with Incilius melanochlorus.

== Etymology ==
The specific name aucoinae honors Lisa Aucoin (1971–2001), an American herpetologist who died in a car accident shortly after returning from a trip to Costa Rica.

== Habitat and conservation ==
It is a very abundant species living in forested habitats, from tree plantations to primary forests. Reproduction takes place in broad, low-gradient streams and rivers during the dry season. There are no important threats to this adaptable species; it also occurs in several protected areas.
