= Incilius perplexus =

Conservation status
- Least Concern (IUCN 3.1)

Scientific classification
- Kingdom: Animalia
- Phylum: Chordata
- Class: Amphibia
- Order: Anura
- Family: Bufonidae
- Genus: Incilius
- Species: I. perplexus

Binomial name
- Incilius perplexus (Taylor, 1943)

Synonyms
- Bufo perplexus Taylor, 1943; Cranopsis perplexa (Taylor, 1943); Ollotis perplexa (Taylor, 1943)

Species of amphibian

Incilius perplexus (common name: confusing toad) is a species of toad in the family Bufonidae. It is endemic to southern Mexico and found in the Tepalcatepec River basin in the state of Michoacán and western Balsas River basin in the state of Guerrero. Its natural habitats are seasonal tropical forests near streams. It breeds in pools. It is threatened by habitat loss caused by infrastructure development and agricultural expansion.
