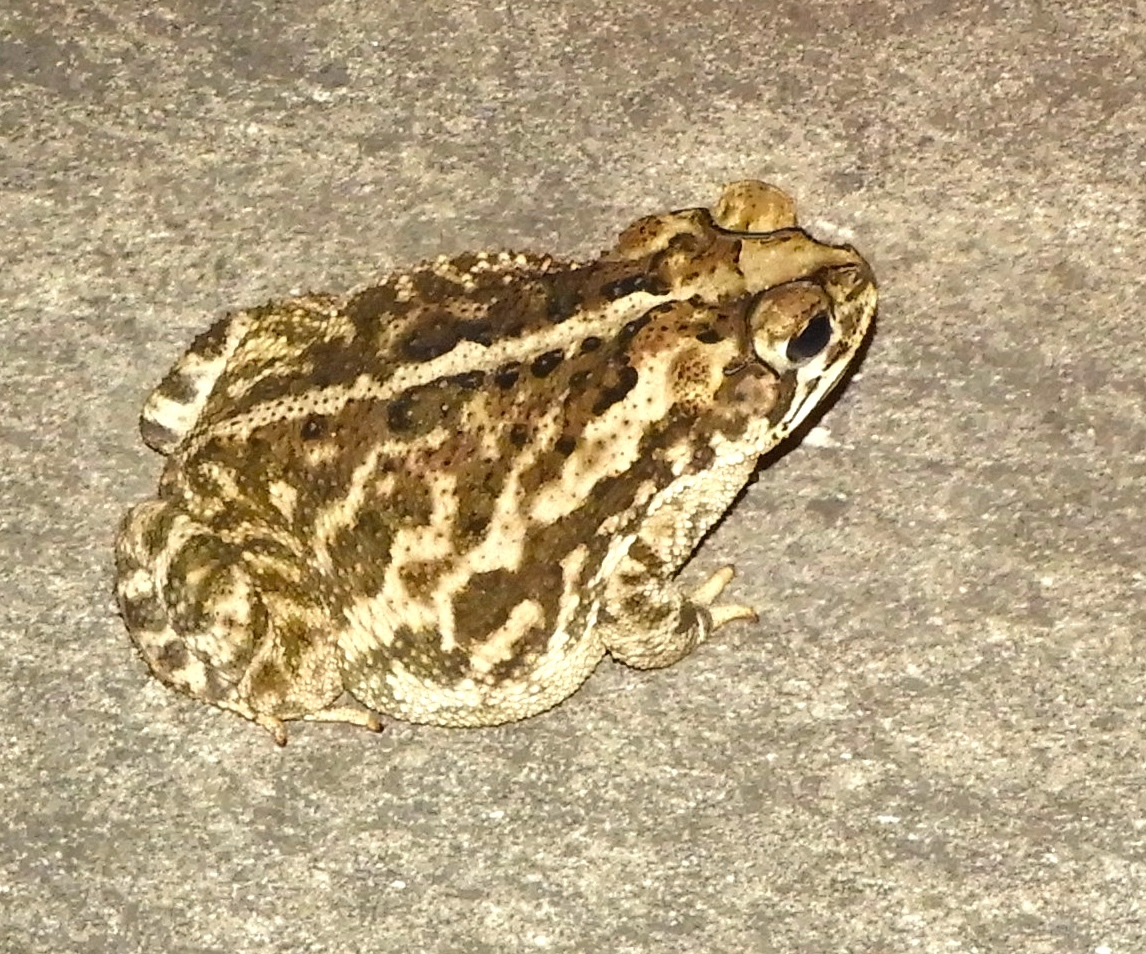

Conservation status
- Least Concern (IUCN 3.1)

Scientific classification
- Kingdom: Animalia
- Phylum: Chordata
- Class: Amphibia
- Order: Anura
- Family: Bufonidae
- Genus: Incilius
- Species: I. mazatlanensis

Binomial name
- Incilius mazatlanensis (Taylor, 1940)

Synonyms
- Bufo mazatlanensis Taylor, 1940 "1939"; Cranopsis mazatlanensis (Taylor, 1940); Ollotis mazatlanensis (Taylor, 1940); Bufo nayaritensis Taylor, 1943

= Incilius mazatlanensis =

Species of amphibian

Incilius mazatlanensis (common name: Sinaloa toad) is a species of toad in the family Bufonidae. It is endemic to Mexico and found in the Pacific coastal plain and slopes from southwestern Chihuahua and northern Sonora south to Colima.

Its natural habitats are tropical deciduous and semi-deciduous forests, riparian environments, and lowland pine forests. It is a common species. It is not threatened although it can be locally impacted by desiccation of water systems.
