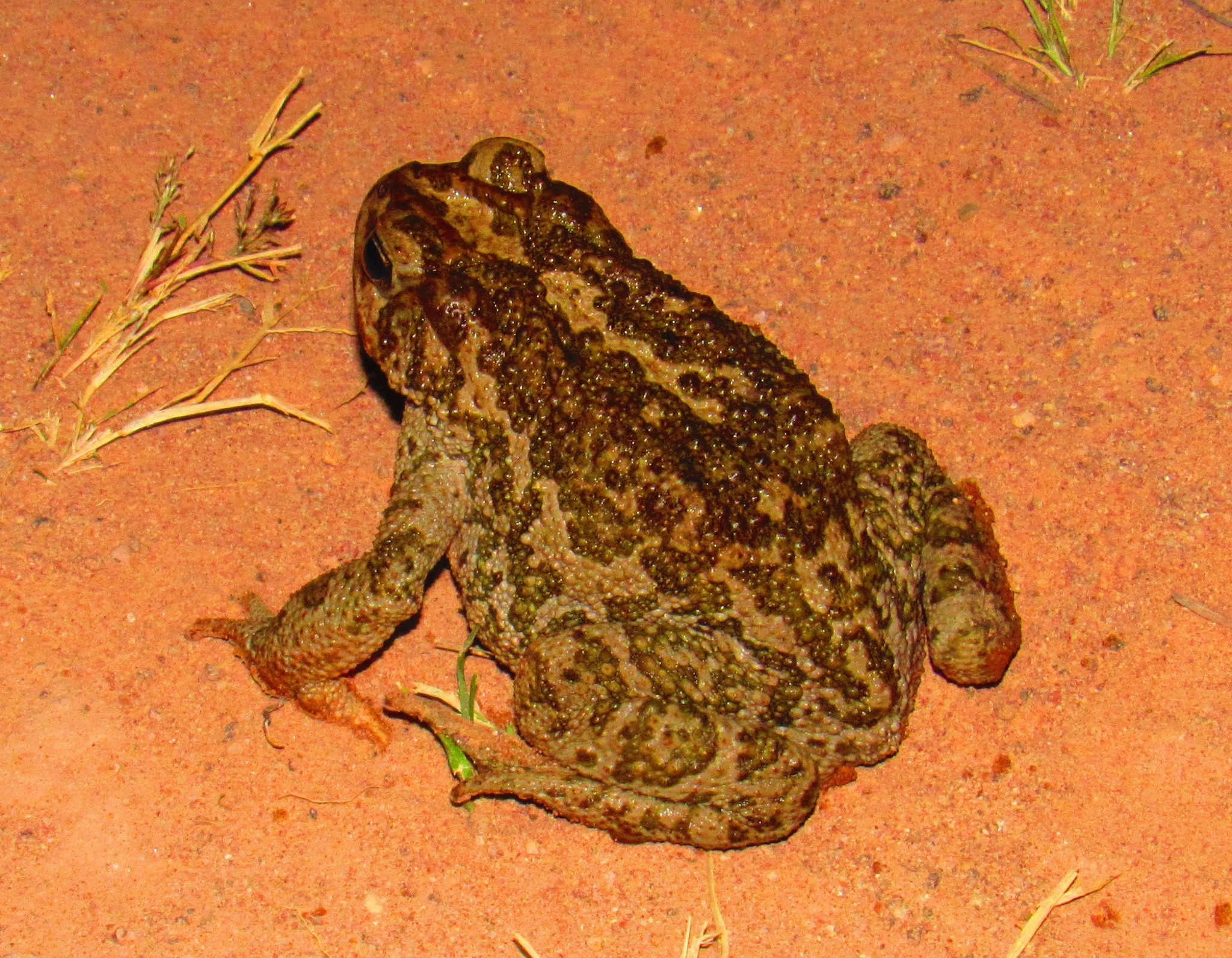

Conservation status
- Least Concern (IUCN 3.1)

Scientific classification
- Kingdom: Animalia
- Phylum: Chordata
- Class: Amphibia
- Order: Anura
- Family: Bufonidae
- Genus: Incilius
- Species: I. occidentalis

Binomial name
- Incilius occidentalis (Camerano, 1879)

Synonyms
- Bufo occidentalis Camerano, 1879; Bufo monksiae Cope, 1879; Cranopsis occidentalis (Camerano, 1879); Bufo intermedius Günther, 1858; Cranopsis intermedia (Günther, 1858); Rhinella intermedia (Günther, 1858); Incilius intermedius (Günther, 1858)

= Pine toad =

Species of amphibian

The pine toad (Incilius occidentalis) is a species of toad in the family Bufonidae. It is endemic to Mexico and found on the Central Mexican Plateau.

== Taxonomy ==
The species was conspecific with Incilius mccoyi until that species was described separately in 2011.

=== Bufo intermedius ===
In 2016, the enigmatic Bufo intermedius, known only from old museum specimens supposedly collected from Ecuador and long suspected to be related to some Mexican species, was found to be synonym of Incilius occidentalis. The decisive piece of evidence were the stomach contents that revealed two beetle species that do not occur in Ecuador.

== Habitat and conservation ==
It is a common toad that lives in a wide variety of habitats, including lowland xeric scrubs, deciduous forest, coniferous forests, and oak forests. It can also occur in disturbed environments. Breeding takes place in streams, and desiccation, alteration and pollution of its breeding habitat are the main threats to this species.
