= Incilius guanacaste =

Conservation status
- Endangered (IUCN 3.1)

Scientific classification
- Kingdom: Animalia
- Phylum: Chordata
- Class: Amphibia
- Order: Anura
- Family: Bufonidae
- Genus: Incilius
- Species: I. guanacaste

Binomial name
- Incilius guanacaste (Vaughan and Mendelson, 2007)

Synonyms
- Crepidophryne guanacaste Vaughan and Mendelson, 2007

Species of amphibian

Incilius guanacaste is a species of toads in the family Bufonidae. It is endemic to the Cordillera de Guanacaste in northern Costa Rica. The species is only known from the slopes of Miravalles Volcano and Rincón de la Vieja Volcano.

Its natural habitats are cloud forests and wind-swept elfin forests, presumably in association with deep leaf litter.

The known range of this little-known species is fully within protected areas.
