= Jeweled toad =

Conservation status
- Endangered (IUCN 3.1)

Scientific classification
- Kingdom: Animalia
- Phylum: Chordata
- Class: Amphibia
- Order: Anura
- Family: Bufonidae
- Genus: Incilius
- Species: I. gemmifer

Binomial name
- Incilius gemmifer (Taylor, 1940)

Synonyms
- Bufo gemmifer Taylor, 1940; Cranopsis gemmifer (Taylor, 1940); Ollotis gemmifer (Taylor, 1940)

Species of amphibian

The jeweled toad (Incilius gemmifer) is a species of toad in the family Bufonidae. It is endemic to Mexico and known from the Pacific Coast between Acapulco (Guerrero state) and Jamiltepec (Oaxaca state). Its natural habitats are xeric and deciduous forests. It is a rare species threatened by habitat loss caused by agricultural expansion, wood extraction, and the expansion of plantations.
