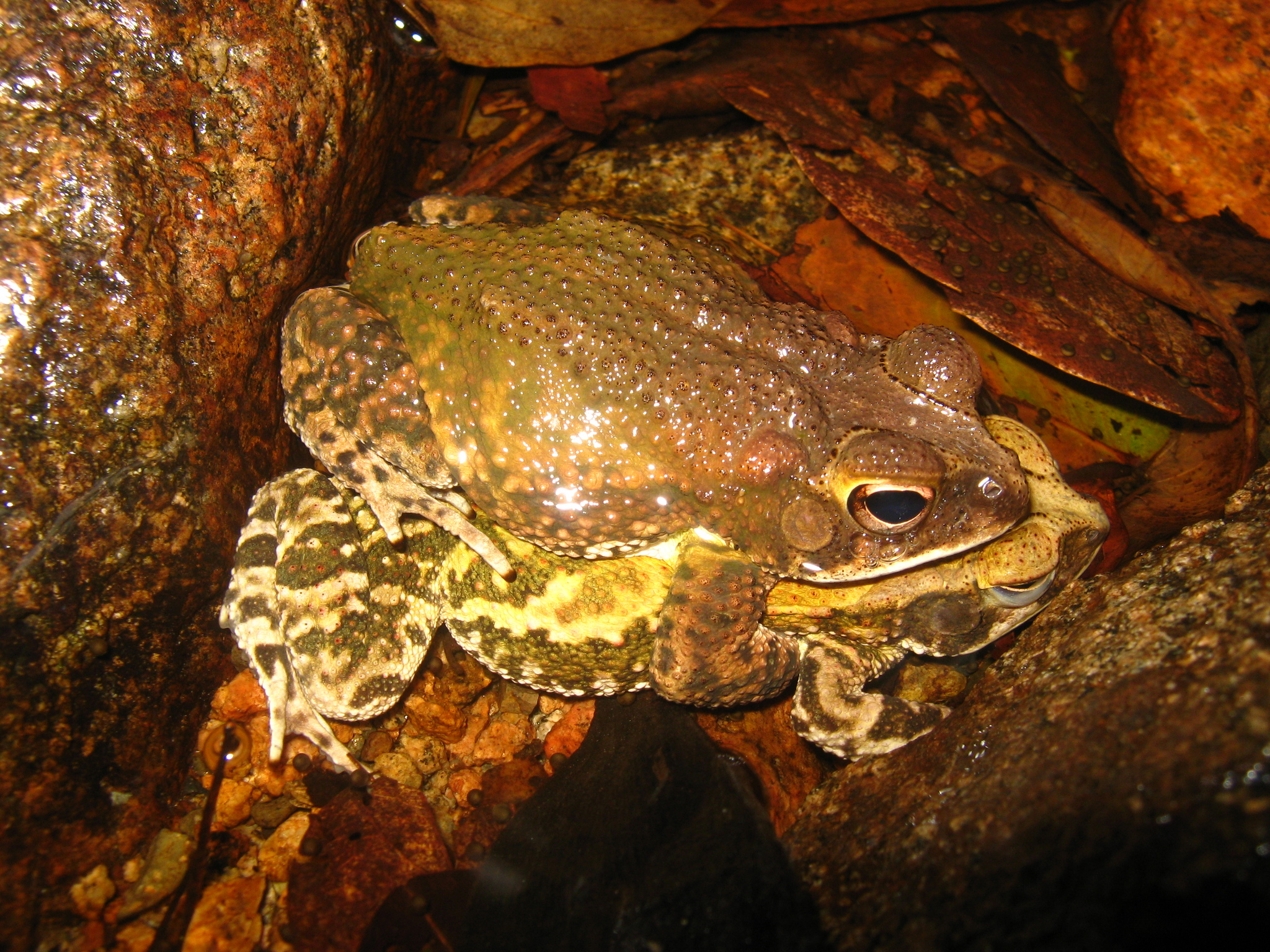

Conservation status
- Least Concern (IUCN 3.1)

Scientific classification
- Kingdom: Animalia
- Phylum: Chordata
- Class: Amphibia
- Order: Anura
- Family: Bufonidae
- Genus: Incilius
- Species: I. marmoreus

Binomial name
- Incilius marmoreus (Wiegmann, 1833)

Synonyms
- Bufo marmoreus Wiegmann, 1833; Bufo argillaceus Cope, 1868; Bufo lateralis Werner, 1894; Bufo eiteli Ahl, 1927 "1926"; Cranopsis marmorea (Wiegmann, 1833); Ollotis marmorea (Wiegmann, 1833)

= Incilius marmoreus =

Species of amphibian

Incilius marmoreus, commonly known as Wiegmann's toad or marbled toad, is a species of toad in the family Bufonidae. It is endemic to Mexico and found along the Pacific coastal plain between northern Sinaloa and Chiapas. There is also an isolated population in the region of Veracruz on the Atlantic coast, and a record from Hidalgo.

Its natural habitats are tropical deciduous and semi-deciduous forests; it also occurs in disturbed habitats that remain relatively closed. Breeding takes place in streams. It is a very common species that might locally be affected by extreme habitat alteration.

== Diet ==
The Marbled toad's main prey items are Ants, Beetles, and termites. They were found to have significantly less diverse diets in disturbed areas. Size, abundance, and weight were not affected by disturbance level.

== Reproduction and Development ==
Found to be opportunistic breeders, reproducing when there is adequate rainfall to fill breeding ponds. Marbled toads lay single adhesive eggs in temporary bodies of water.

I. marmoreus tadpoles have black coloration on their cheeks and on the top of the head and body. The dorsal tail fin has a black reticulation, and the ventral tail fin is clear except near the tip. The tail muscle is black dorsally and laterally, and white ventrally. The throat is clear. The anal tube is medial and the spiracle is single and sinistra.
