= Almirante Trail toad =

Conservation status
- Critically Endangered (IUCN 3.1)

Scientific classification
- Kingdom: Animalia
- Phylum: Chordata
- Class: Amphibia
- Order: Anura
- Family: Bufonidae
- Genus: Incilius
- Species: I. peripatetes

Binomial name
- Incilius peripatetes (Savage, 1972)

Synonyms
- Bufo peripatetes Savage, 1972; Cranopsis peripatetes (Savage, 1972)

Species of amphibian

The Almirante Trail toad (Incilius peripatetes) is a species of toad endemic to Panama. It is only known from its type locality near Boquete, Chiriquí, in western Panama. Another population from Cerro Bollo that has been referred to this species was described in 2013 as a separate species, Incilius majordomus.

== Etymology ==
The specific name peripatetes is Greek for "one who walks" and alludes to Charles F. Walker, a student of herpetology at the University of Michigan.

== Description ==
Incilius peripatetes is a medium-sized toad, with the holotype, an adult male, reported to be 70 mm (2.8 in) in snout–vent length. Dorsal coloration is uniformly light brown or grey. The dorsum is rugose, without enlarged warts. The cranial crests are very prominent, whereas the paratoid glands are slightly small, smaller than the eye. The ventral surface is light brown. The rear surfaces of the thighs and the groin are dark brown or black, with some light spots in the groin. The hands and feet have fleshy webbing between the fingers and toes. There is no vocal sack in the males.

== Habitat and conservation ==
This is a little known terrestrial toad inhabiting premontane wet forest at elevation of 1,500 m (4,900 ft) asl. It is likely to be affected by chytridiomycosis. Also some habitat destruction is taking place. It is listed as a critically endangered species due to an expected population decline in coming years.
