= Incilius epioticus =

Conservation status
- Vulnerable (IUCN 3.1)

Scientific classification
- Kingdom: Animalia
- Phylum: Chordata
- Class: Amphibia
- Order: Anura
- Family: Bufonidae
- Genus: Incilius
- Species: I. epioticus

Binomial name
- Incilius epioticus (Cope, 1875)

Synonyms
- Crepidius epiotica Cope, 1875 "1876"; Bufo epioticus (Cope, 1875); Crepidophryne epiotica (Cope, 1875); Nannophryne epiotica (Cope, 1875)

Species of amphibian

Incilius epioticus (common name: Cerro Utyum toad) is a species of toad in the family Bufonidae. It is found on the Atlantic versant of the Cordillera de Talamanca in south-eastern Costa Rica and north-eastern Panama. Its natural habitats are primary and mature secondary forests, cloud forests, and highland oak forests. It is diurnal and found over dead leaves on the forest floor.
