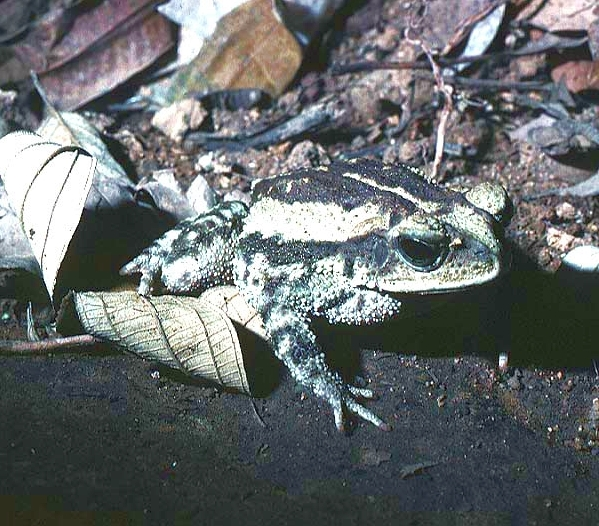

Conservation status
- Least Concern (IUCN 3.1)

Scientific classification
- Kingdom: Animalia
- Phylum: Chordata
- Class: Amphibia
- Order: Anura
- Family: Bufonidae
- Genus: Incilius
- Species: I. luetkenii

Binomial name
- Incilius luetkenii (Boulenger, 1891)

Synonyms
- Bufo luetkenii Boulenger, 1891; Cranopsis luetkenii (Boulenger, 1891); Ollotis luetkenii (Boulenger, 1891)

= Incilius luetkenii =

Species of amphibian

Incilius luetkenii (formerly Bufo luetkenii, common name yellow toad) is a species of toad in the family Bufonidae. It is found in Mesoamerica along the Pacific versant from central Costa Rica to extreme southern Chiapas, Mexico (including the intervening Guatemala, El Salvador, Honduras, and Nicaragua), as well as dry interior valleys of Guatemala and Honduras and San Juan River drainage in Costa Rica on the Atlantic versant. It occurs in open areas, including disturbed pasturelands in lowland dry forests, and to a lesser extent, in lowland moist and premontane moist forests. It breeds in temporary pools. It is a common species that is not facing major threats. Additionally, this species of toad is known for using their vocal behaviors in order to call for mating. This can sometimes lead to aggression between those who are male in the species.
