= Cranopsis =

The Latin word Cranopsis has been used to name animal genera of frogs, mollusks and branchiopods. Cranopsis (Cope 1875), was used for an anuran, and is a junior homonym of Cranopsis (Adams 1860), for a mollusk; and Cranopsis (Dall 1871), for a branchiopod. Cranopsis currently describes a mollusk genus in the family Fissurellidae.

The name was very briefly resurrected for a subgroup of toads (Bufo) by Frost et al. (2006a). However, Frost et al. (2006b) noted that this was a mistake, because Cranopsis was preoccupied, and they proposed Ollotis (Cope, 1975) as a replacement. Unfortunately, Ollotis is a subjective junior synonym of Incilius (Cope, 1863).

== See also ==
Data related to Cranopsis at Wikispecies

- Bufo
