= Incilius spiculatus =

Conservation status
- Endangered (IUCN 3.1)

Scientific classification
- Kingdom: Animalia
- Phylum: Chordata
- Class: Amphibia
- Order: Anura
- Family: Bufonidae
- Genus: Incilius
- Species: I. spiculatus

Binomial name
- Incilius spiculatus (Mendelson, 1997)

Synonyms
- Bufo spiculatus Mendelson, 1997; Cranopsis spiculatus (Mendelson, 1997); Ollotiis spiculatus (Mendelson, 1997)

Species of amphibian

Incilius spiculatus (common name: spiculate toad) is a species of toad in the family Bufonidae. It is endemic to Oaxaca, Mexico, and known from the northern slopes of the Sierra de Juárez and the adjacent Sierra Mixe. Its natural habitats are cloud forests and lowland rainforests. It breeds in streams. It is threatened by habitat loss.
