= Incilius tutelarius =

Conservation status
- Vulnerable (IUCN 3.1)

Scientific classification
- Kingdom: Animalia
- Phylum: Chordata
- Class: Amphibia
- Order: Anura
- Family: Bufonidae
- Genus: Incilius
- Species: I. tutelarius

Binomial name
- Incilius tutelarius (Mendelson, 1997)

Synonyms
- Bufo tutelarius Mendelson, 1997; Cranopsis tutelarius (Mendelson, 1997); Ollotis tutelarius (Mendelson, 1997)

Species of amphibian

Incilius tutelarius (Chimalapas toad) is a species of toad in the family Bufonidae. It is found in the Sierra Chimalapa and Sierra Madre de Chiapas (including Volcán Tacaná) in Guatemala and Chiapas, Mexico. Its natural habitats are cloud forests and pine-oak (broadleaf) forests. It is closely associated with streams, its breeding habitat. It is threatened by habitat loss.
