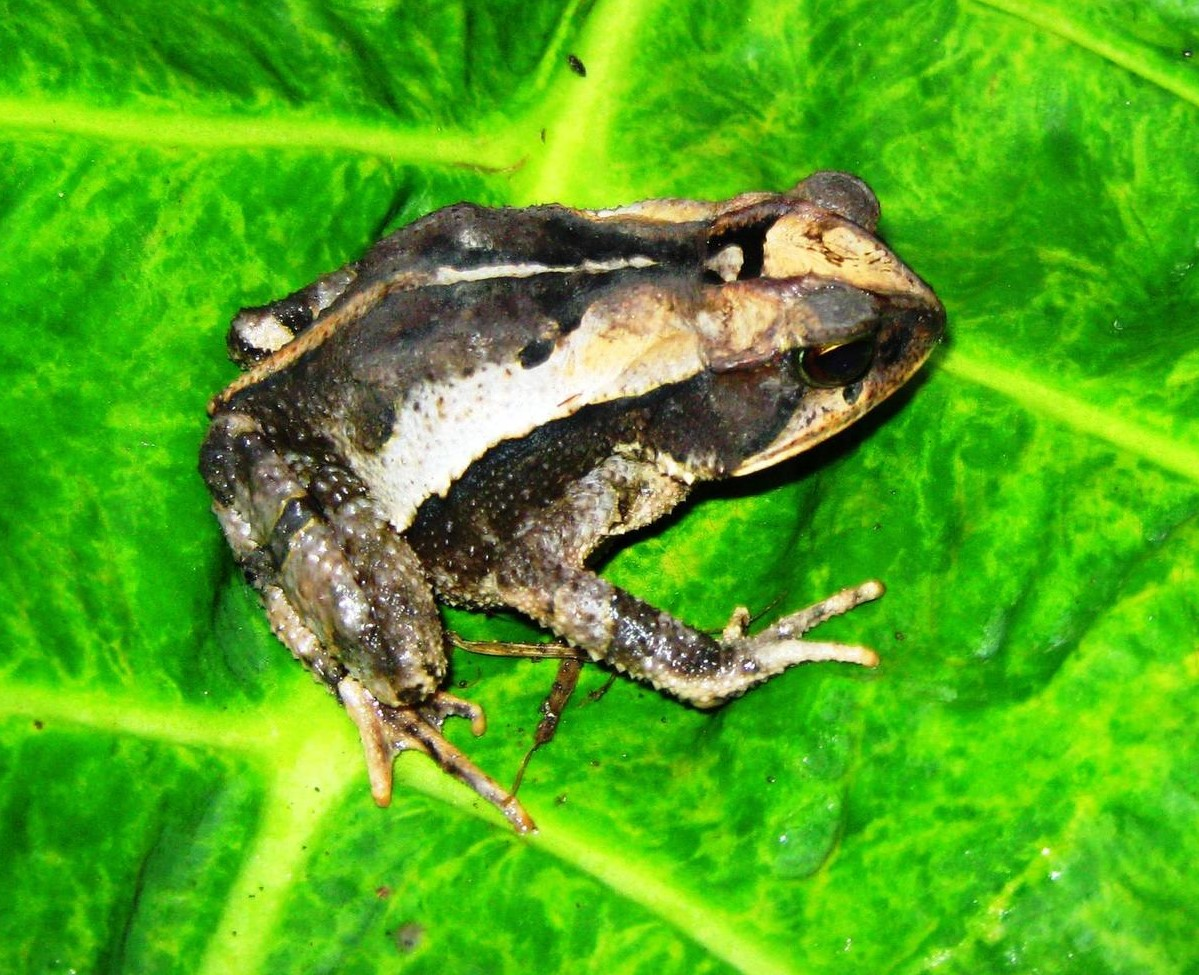

Conservation status
- Endangered (IUCN 3.1)

Scientific classification
- Kingdom: Animalia
- Phylum: Chordata
- Class: Amphibia
- Order: Anura
- Family: Bufonidae
- Genus: Incilius
- Species: I. cavifrons

Binomial name
- Incilius cavifrons (Firschein, 1950)

Synonyms
- Bufo cavifrons Firschein, 1950; Cranopsis cavifrons (Firschein, 1950)

= Mountain toad =

Species of amphibian

The mountain toad (Incilius cavifrons) is a species of toad in the family Bufonidae. It is endemic to the Sierra de los Tuxtlas region in southern Veracruz state, Mexico.

Its natural habitats are tropical pine-oak forests. It breeds in streams.

This naturally rare species is threatened by habitat loss caused by agricultural activities, wood extraction, and infrastructure development.
