= Incilius signifer =

Conservation status
- Least Concern (IUCN 3.1)

Scientific classification
- Kingdom: Animalia
- Phylum: Chordata
- Class: Amphibia
- Order: Anura
- Family: Bufonidae
- Genus: Incilius
- Species: I. signifer

Binomial name
- Incilius signifer (Mendelson, Williams, Sheil & Mulcahy, 2005)

Synonyms
- Bufo signifer Mendelson, Williams, Sheil & Mulcahy, 2005

Species of amphibian

Incilius signifer is a species of toads in the family Bufonidae. It is endemic to Panama and known from the Pacific Coast to 800 m (2,600 ft) asl, west of the Canal Zone. Prior to its description in 2005, it was mixed with Incilius coccifer. Its natural habitats are tropical dry forests. It tolerates habitat modification but could be threatened by severe habitat modification.
