= Gulf Coast toad =

Conservation status
- Least Concern (IUCN 3.1)

Scientific classification
- Kingdom: Animalia
- Phylum: Chordata
- Class: Amphibia
- Order: Anura
- Family: Bufonidae
- Genus: Incilius
- Species: I. valliceps

Binomial name
- Incilius valliceps (Wiegmann, 1833)

Synonyms
- Bufo trachypus Wiegmann, 1833; Bufo valliceps Wiegmann, 1833; Cranopsis valliceps (Wiegmann, 1833); Ollotis valliceps (Wiegmann, 1833)

Species of amphibian

The Gulf Coast toad (Incilius valliceps) is a species of toad native to eastern and southeastern Mexico and Central America as far south as Costa Rica.

== Description ==
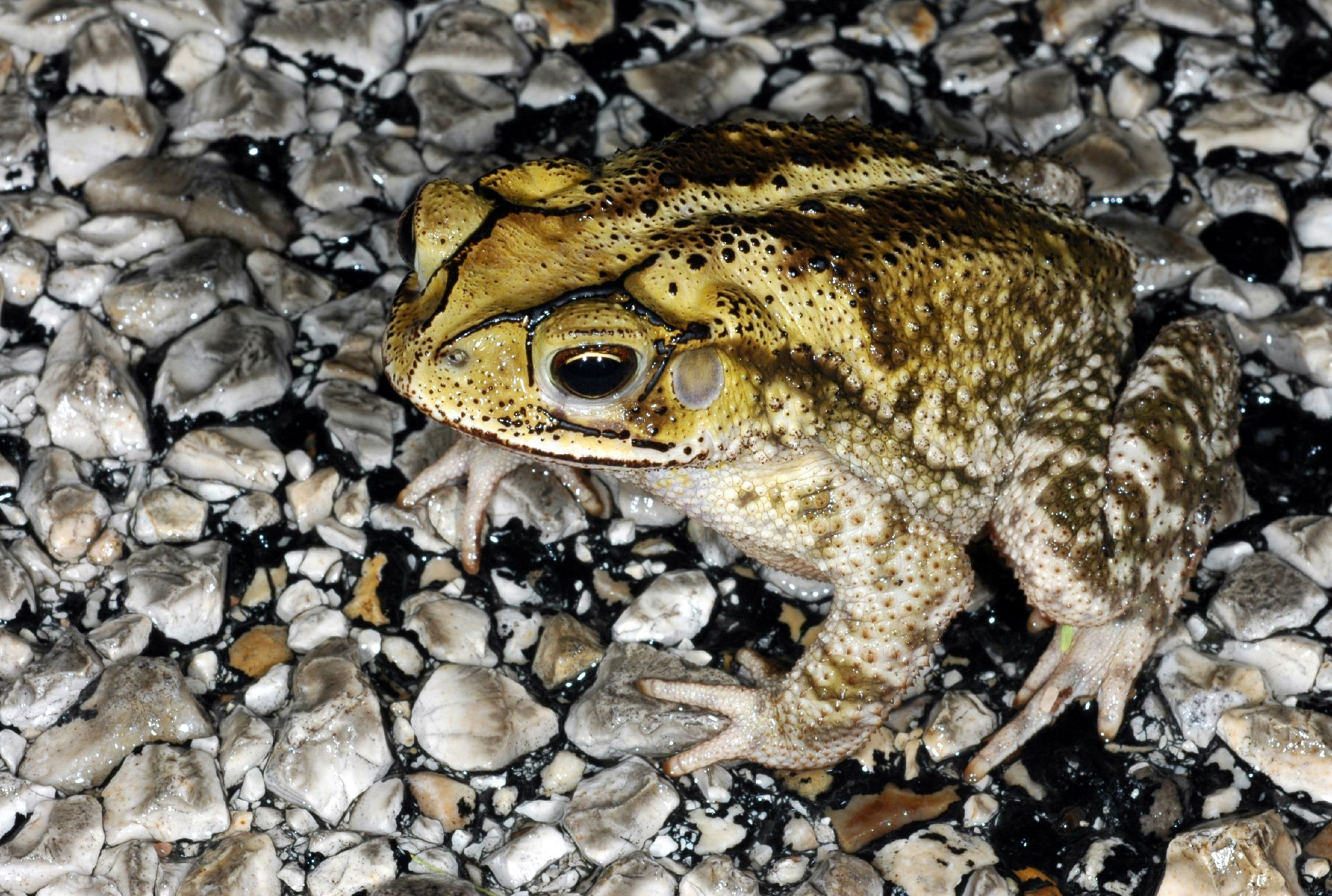
Yellow-backed I. valliceps

The Gulf Coast toad is a medium-sized toad species, ranging from 2.5 to 10.2 cm (1 to 4 in) in length. Their back varies in color from nearly black, to shades of brown and grey with a distinctive white or yellowish colored stripe down the center, and sometimes lighter colored patches on the sides. Their underside is yellow or cream colored. Their back is covered in small tubercles, while their underside is normally devoid of them.

I. valliceps has the most extensive ridging of any toad in its geographic range. The ridges extend from the nose, to the back of the head, and with a branch that wraps around the back side of the eye.

== Habitat ==
The Gulf Coast toad is found in a wide range of habitats, including open grassland, semi-arid regions, light forest, and even suburban backyards. They are typically found not far from a permanent water source, which they use for breeding in the spring, but they are capable of travelling long distances while foraging for food.

== Diet ==
Like most toads, the Gulf Coast toad is an opportunistic carnivore. It will eat almost any small arthropod it is able to overpower and swallow.
