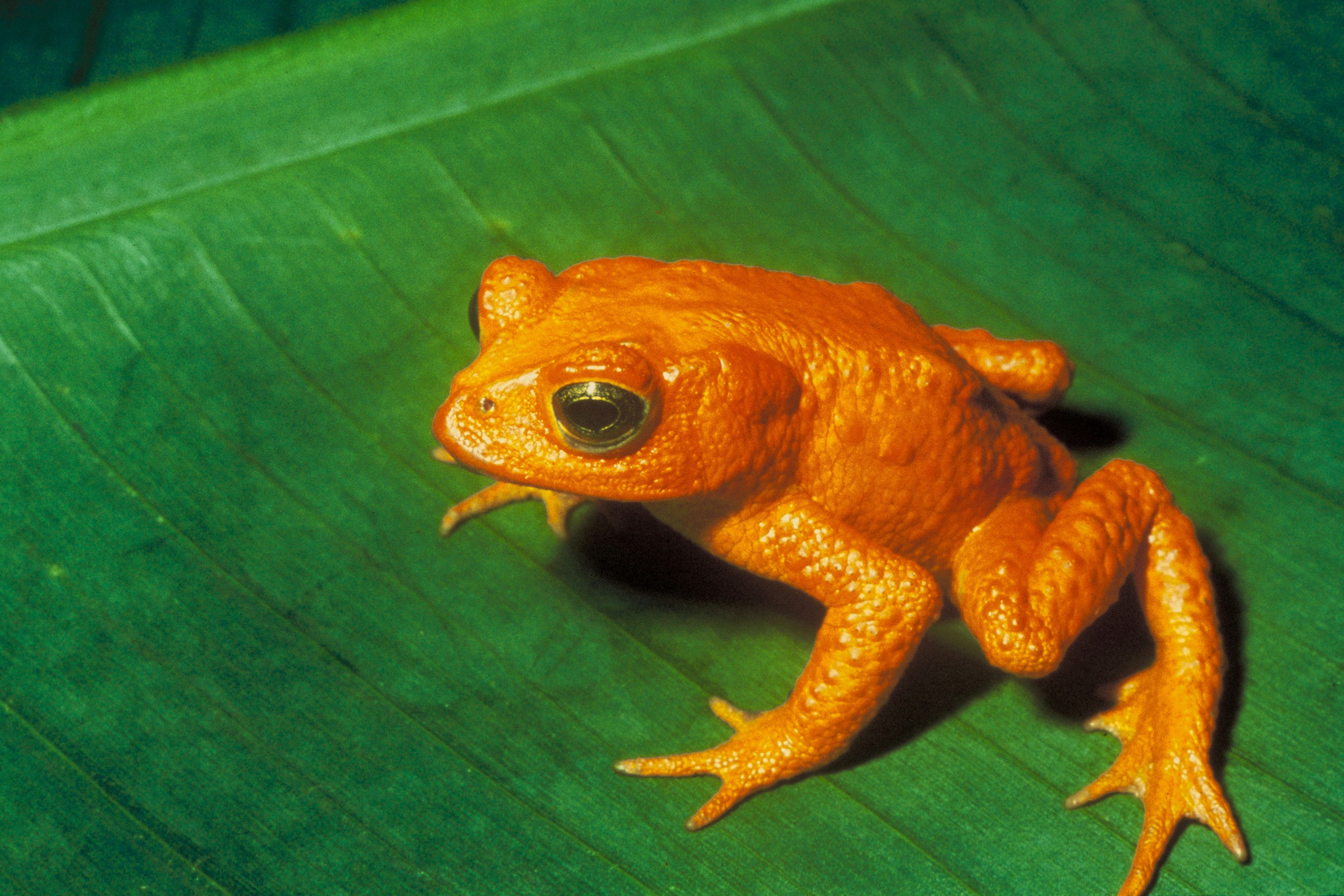
- A golden toad, an extinct species of toad in the Incilius genus

Scientific classification
- Kingdom: Animalia
- Phylum: Chordata
- Class: Amphibia
- Order: Anura
- Family: Bufonidae
- Genus: Incilius; Cope, 1863

Type species
- Bufo coniferus (Cope, 1862)

Synonyms
- Cranopsis Cope, 1875 "1876" (junior homonym of Cranopsis Adams, 1860 (Mollusca) and Cranopsis Dall, 1871 (Brachiopoda)); Ollotis Cope, 1875 "1876"; Crepidius Cope, 1875 "1876" (primary homonym of Crepidius Candeze, 1859 (Coleoptera)); Crepidophryne Cope, 1889 (replacement name for Crepidius); Cranophryne Cope, 1889 (replacement name for Cranopsis)

= Incilius =

Incilius Temporal range: Early Miocene–present

Genus of amphibians

Incilius is a genus of toads in the true toad family, Bufonidae. They are sometimes known as the Central American toads or Middle American toads and are found in southern USA, Mexico, Central America, and northern Pacific South America (Colombia and Ecuador). They are an ecologically and biogeographically diverse group of toads, including micro-endemic species such as Incilius spiculatus that are restricted to undisturbed cloud forests, and widespread lowland species such as Incilius valliceps that predominantly occur in disturbed habitats.

== Taxonomy and systematics ==
This genus was first described in 1863 by Edward Drinker Cope who designated the type species as Incilius coniferus. This proved unpopular and these toads were known under the genus Bufo until the early 2000s.

The current delineation of the genus follows Mendelson et al. (2011) who brought Cranopsis/Cranophryne/Ollotis and Crepidius/Crepidophryne into synonymy with Incilius, while providing evidence for removing Rhinella from Incilius. Taxonomy and systematics of the toads now considered to be classified in this genus had seen many changes after Incilius was resurrected to split Bufo in the less than a decade before this 2011 paper. I. coniferus went through some five name changes in less than a dozen years. However, the monophyly of Incilius continues to be threatened by Incilius bocourti, which might be the sister taxon of Anaxyrus.

Another discussion has been the taxonomic level at which the genus is recognized. Incilius did not see wide recognition before the large-scale revision of amphibian systematics by Darrel Frost and colleagues in 2006, then under the name Cranopsis, including the former "Bufo valliceps group" and some related species. However, others have argued that Incilius should be treated as a subgenus of Bufo.

== Species ==
There are at present 39 species:

- Incilius alvarius (Girard, 1859)
- Incilius aucoinae (O'Neill and Mendelson, 2004)
- Incilius aurarius Mendelson, Mulcahy, Snell, Acevedo, and Campbell, 2012
- Incilius bocourti (Brocchi, 1877)
- Incilius campbelli (Mendelson, 1994)
- Incilius canaliferus (Cope, 1877)
- Incilius cavifrons (Firschein, 1950)
- Incilius chompipe (Vaughan and Mendelson, 2007)
- Incilius coccifer (Cope, 1866)
- Incilius coniferus (Cope, 1862)
- Incilius cristatus (Wiegmann, 1833)
- Incilius cycladen (Lynch and Smith, 1966)
- Incilius epioticus (Cope, 1875)
- Incilius fastidiosus (Cope, 1875)
- Incilius gemmifer (Taylor, 1940)
- Incilius guanacaste (Vaughan and Mendelson, 2007)
- Incilius holdridgei (Taylor, 1952)
- Incilius ibarrai (Stuart, 1954)
- Incilius karenlipsae Mendelson and Mulcahy, 2010
- Incilius leucomyos (McCranie and Wilson, 2000)
- Incilius luetkenii (Boulenger, 1891)
- Incilius macrocristatus (Firschein and Smith, 1957)
- Incilius majordomus Savage, Ugarte, and Donnelly, 2013
- Incilius marmoreus (Wiegmann, 1833)
- Incilius mazatlanensis (Taylor, 1940)
- Incilius mccoyi Santos-Barrera and Flores-Villela, 2011
- Incilius melanochlorus (Cope, 1877)
- Incilius nebulifer (Girard, 1854)
- Incilius occidentalis (Camerano, 1879)
- †Incilius periglenes (Savage, 1967)
- Incilius peripatetes (Savage, 1972)
- Incilius perplexus (Taylor, 1943)
- Incilius pisinnus (Mendelson, Williams, Sheil, and Mulcahy, 2005)
- Incilius porteri (Mendelson, Williams, Sheil, and Mulcahy, 2005)
- Incilius signifer (Mendelson, Williams, Sheil, and Mulcahy, 2005)
- Incilius spiculatus (Mendelson, 1997)
- Incilius tacanensis (Smith, 1952)
- Incilius tutelarius (Mendelson, 1997)
- Incilius valliceps (Wiegmann, 1833)

The AmphibiaWeb recognizes Incilius intermedius (Günther, 1858) as a valid species, whereas the Amphibian Species of the World considers it a synonym of Incilius occidentalis (Camerano, 1879).

One fossil species, Incilius praevius (Tihen, 1951), is known from the Early Miocene (Hemingfordian) of Florida.
