= Incilius majordomus =

Conservation status
- Critically endangered, possibly extinct (IUCN 3.1)

Scientific classification
- Kingdom: Animalia
- Phylum: Chordata
- Class: Amphibia
- Order: Anura
- Family: Bufonidae
- Genus: Incilius
- Species: I. majordomus

Binomial name
- Incilius majordomus Savage, Ugarte & Donnelly, 2013

Species of amphibian

Incilius majordomus, also known as the Chief's toad, is a species of frog in the family Bufonidae. It has not been seen since 1980, and is believed to be possibly extinct.

== Taxonomy ==
The species was first described in 2013. Its specific epithet comes from the Latin phrase majordomus and honors the herpetologist Charles W. Myers.

== Description ==
Incilius majordomus is a moderately sized toad, with males reaching 78mm in length and females growing up to 91mm. Males and females also differ in coloration; males are a bright yellow and females are duller shades of tan and brown.
