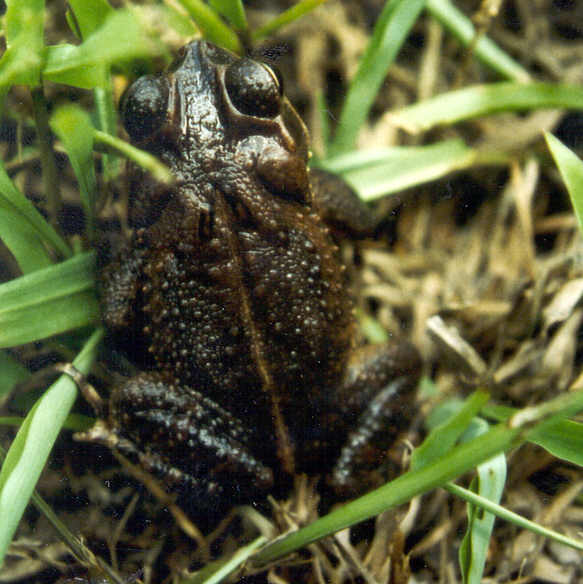

Conservation status
- Least Concern (IUCN 3.1)

Scientific classification
- Kingdom: Animalia
- Phylum: Chordata
- Class: Amphibia
- Order: Anura
- Family: Bufonidae
- Genus: Incilius
- Species: I. campbelli

Binomial name
- Incilius campbelli (Mendelson, 1994)

Synonyms
- Bufo campbelli Mendelson, 1994; Cranopsis campbelli (Mendelson, 1994); Ollotis campbelli (Mendelson, 1994)

= Incilius campbelli =

Species of amphibian

Incilius campbelli (commonly known as Campbell's rainforest toad or Campbell's forest toad) is a species of toad in the family Bufonidae. It was first described in 1994. It is found in eastern Chiapas (Mexico), Guatemala, western Honduras, and Maya Mountains, Belize. Its natural habitats are lowland moist and premontane wet forests, and pristine forests in mountainous regions. It is threatened by habitat loss.
