= Incilius pisinnus =

Conservation status
- Endangered (IUCN 3.1)

Scientific classification
- Kingdom: Animalia
- Phylum: Chordata
- Class: Amphibia
- Order: Anura
- Family: Bufonidae
- Genus: Incilius
- Species: I. pisinnus

Binomial name
- Incilius pisinnus (Mendelson, Williams, Sheil, and Mulcahy, 2005)

Synonyms
- Bufo pisinnus Mendelson, Williams, Sheil, and Mulcahy, 2005; Cranopsis pisinna (Mendelson et al., 2005); Ollotis pisinnus (Mendelson et al., 2005)

Species of amphibian

Incilius pisinnus (common name: Michoacan toad) is a species of "true" toads in the family Bufonidae. It is endemic to Mexico and known from the Tepalcatepec Valley in Michoacán. Prior to its description in 2005, it was mixed with Incilius coccifer and Incilius cycladen. The specific name pisinnus, from the Latin word for "small", refers to the comparatively small size of this species among its close relatives.

== Description ==
Adult males measure 39–51 mm (1.5–2.0 in) and adult females 55–62 mm (2.2–2.4 in) in snout–vent length. The body is robust. The snout is pointed in dorsal view and rounded in profile. The tympanum is distinct. The fingers are short, slender, and have no webbing nor fringes, whereas the toes have some webbing and the inner toes have also lateral fringes. The canthal, supraorbital, supratympanic, postorbital, preorbital, pretympanic, and supralabial crests are present. The parietal crest is poorly developed or absent. The parotoid glands are ovoid. The dorsum is rugose. The dorsal ground color is yellowish tan. There are dark brown spots and a deep yellow or cream mid-dorsal stripe. The venter is whitish cream, possibly with black flecks. The iris is pale gold. Males have a single, heavily pigmented vocal sac.

== Habitat and conservation ==
Incilius pisinnus inhabit grassy areas with mesquite shrub, rocks, and barren areas at elevations around 335 m (1,099 ft) above sea level. Males have been observed calling in muddy ditches and flooded grass fields after heavy rains. Although believed adapt to disturbance, severe habitat change and agricultural chemicals remain threats. It is not known to occur in any protected areas.
