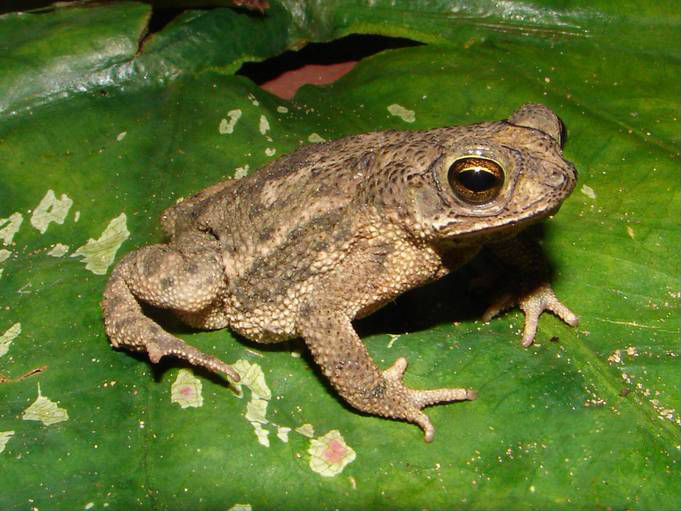

Conservation status
- Least Concern (IUCN 3.1)

Scientific classification
- Kingdom: Animalia
- Phylum: Chordata
- Class: Amphibia
- Order: Anura
- Family: Bufonidae
- Genus: Rhinella
- Species: R. granulosa

Binomial name
- Rhinella granulosa (Spix, 1824)

Synonyms
- Bufo granulosus Spix, 1824; Chaunus granulosus (Spix, 1824)

= Rhinella granulosa =

Species of amphibian

Rhinella granulosa, also known as granular toad and common lesser toad, is a species of toad in the family Bufonidae. The species was redelimited in 2009 and is now considered endemic to Brazil.

According to the International Union for Conservation of Nature (IUCN)—still using a broader definition for this species—the natural habitats of Rhinella granulosa are open areas, savanna, forests, and river shorelines. During the daytime they hide in holes in the ground. They feed on ants and termites. This adaptable species is not considered threatened.
