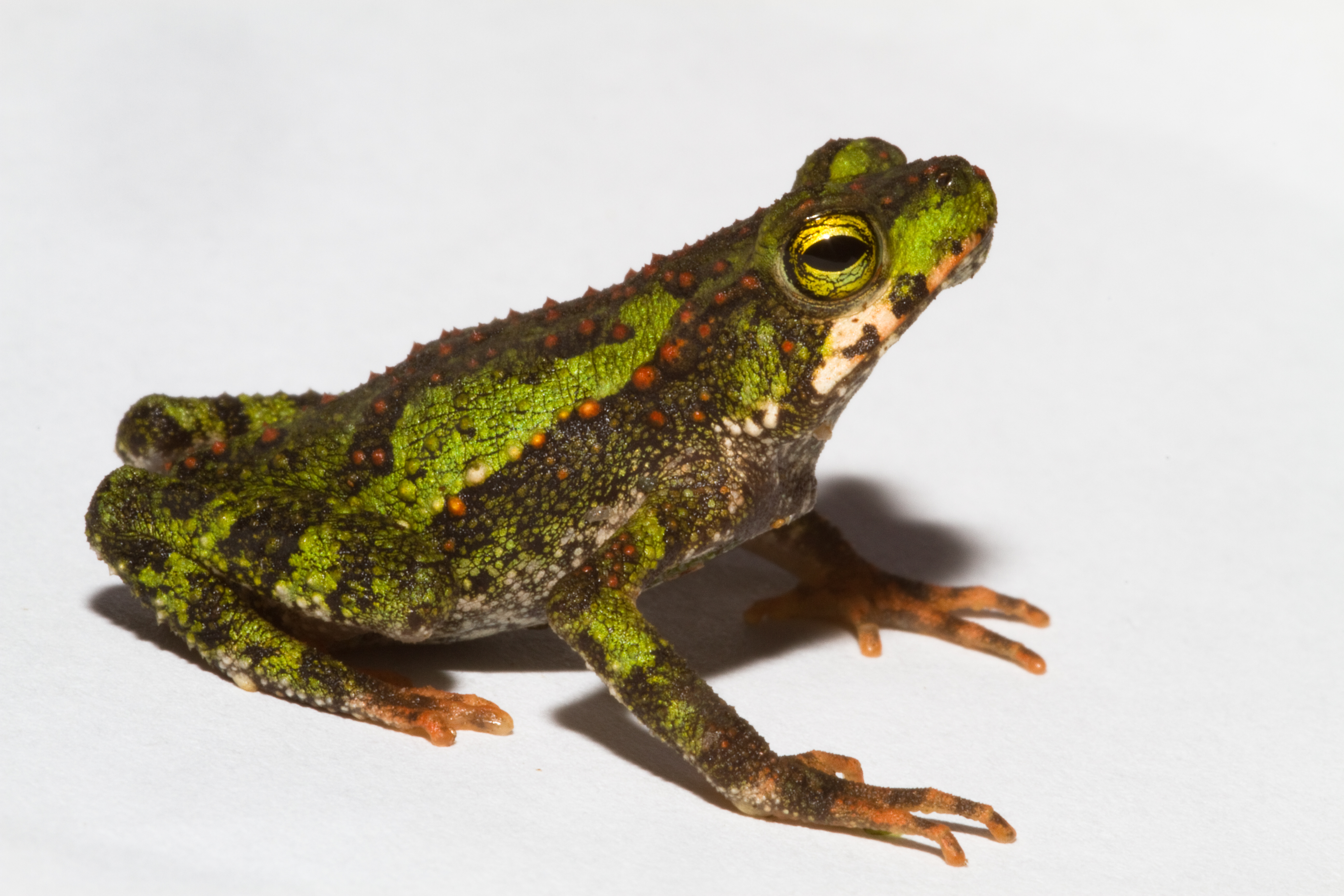

Conservation status
- Least Concern (IUCN 3.1)

Scientific classification
- Kingdom: Animalia
- Phylum: Chordata
- Class: Amphibia
- Order: Anura
- Family: Bufonidae
- Genus: Incilius
- Species: I. coniferus

Binomial name
- Incilius coniferus (Cope, 1862)
- Incilius coniferus range map. The range is displayed in green.

Synonyms
- Bufo ehlersi Werner, 1899; Bufo coniferus; Cranopsis coniferus

= Incilius coniferus =

Evergreen toad

Species of amphibian

The evergreen toad (Incilius coniferus) is a species of toad in the family Bufonidae.

== Conservation status ==
It is potentially threatened by habitat loss, but is still categorized as a least-concern species by the International Union for Conservation of Nature. A species cannot be assigned to the least-concern category unless it has had its population status evaluated.

== Description ==
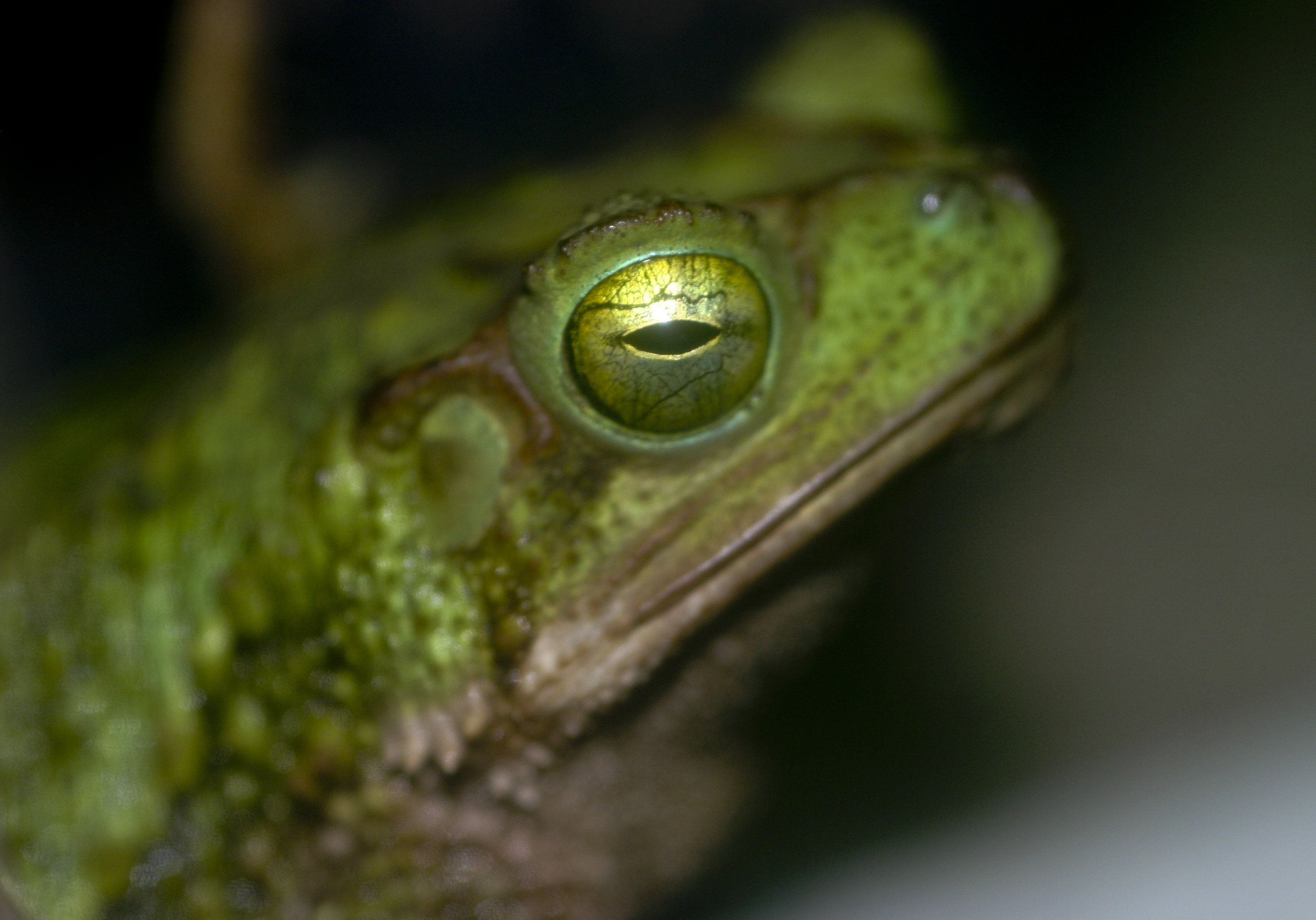
Side-view of one of these toads.

The evergreen toad (also known as the "green climbing toad") can be colored with browns, greens, and even yellows. These colors on its back and other areas of the body are arranged in a camouflage pattern that can be unique between each member of the species. Its eyes are green with vertically slit pupils.

Adult males of the species can measure approximately 53–72 mm and adult females 76–94 mm. Females and males in adulthood or easy to tell apart due to males usually having just abit brighter coloring. However, when they haven't metamorphosed yet, males and females are practically indistinguishable as all the tadpoles look identical.

== Distribution and habitat ==
It is found in Colombia, Costa Rica, Ecuador, Nicaragua, and Panama.

The toad is commonly found in lowland wet and moist forest zones, and is less frequently found in per-mountain wet forest and lower mountain wet forest zones. Its natural habitats are subtropical or tropical moist lowland forests, rivers, freshwater marshes, rural gardens, urban areas, and heavily degraded former forest. The Pacific Equatorial Forest is also this green toad's home.

=== Altitude ===
It is present up to 1,550 m (5,090 ft) above sea level.
