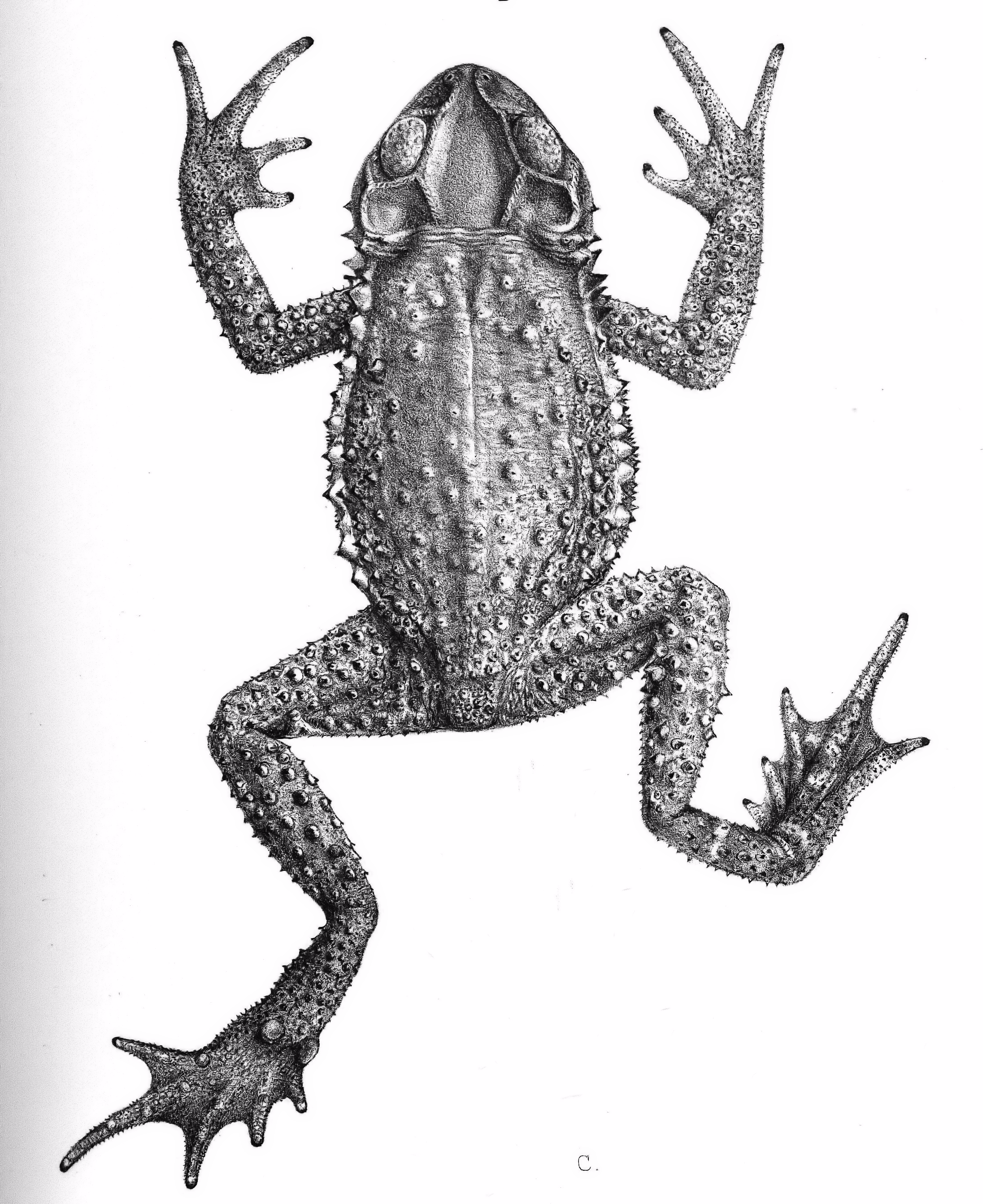

Conservation status
- Endangered (IUCN 3.1)

Scientific classification
- Kingdom: Animalia
- Phylum: Chordata
- Class: Amphibia
- Order: Anura
- Family: Bufonidae
- Genus: Incilius
- Species: I. cristatus

Binomial name
- Incilius cristatus (Wiegmann, 1833)

Synonyms
- Bufo cristatus Wiegmann, 1833; Cranopsis cristata (Wiegmann, 1833); Ollotis cristata (Wiegmann, 1833); Bufo occipitalis Camerano, 1879

= Incilius cristatus =

Species of amphibian

Incilius cristatus (formerly Bufo cristatus), the large-crested toad, is an endangered species of true toad that is endemic to cloud forests in the central Sierra Madre Oriental in Puebla and Veracruz, Mexico. Once feared extinct, it has recently been rediscovered at two sites in Puebla where it is uncommon. The reasons for its decline are habitat loss and pollution, and there are no recent records from Veracruz.
