= Incilius fastidiosus =

Pico Blanco toad

Conservation status
- Critically Endangered (IUCN 3.1)

Scientific classification
- Kingdom: Animalia
- Phylum: Chordata
- Class: Amphibia
- Order: Anura
- Family: Bufonidae
- Genus: Incilius
- Species: I. fastidiosus

Binomial name
- Incilius fastidiosus (Cope, 1875)

Synonyms
- Cranopsis fastidiosus Cope, 1875 "1976"; Ollotis coerulescens Cope, 1875 "1876"; Bufo fastidiosus (Cope, 1875); Ollotis fastidiosus (Cope, 1875)

Species of amphibian

Incilius fastidiosus, or the Pico Blanco toad, is a species of toad from western Panama and southeastern Costa Rica. It inhabits premontane and lower montane rainforest. It is largely a fossorial species that breeds explosively in temporary pools after heavy rains in late April–May. Juveniles occur on rocky stream margins the year round.

It is listed as a critically endangered species due to a drastic population decline, probably caused by chytridiomycosis, and to some extent, habitat loss.
