= Incilius macrocristatus =

Conservation status
- Near Threatened (IUCN 3.1)

Scientific classification
- Kingdom: Animalia
- Phylum: Chordata
- Class: Amphibia
- Order: Anura
- Family: Bufonidae
- Genus: Incilius
- Species: I. macrocristatus

Binomial name
- Incilius macrocristatus Firschein and Smith, 1957

Synonyms
- Bufo valliceps macrocristatus Firschein and Smith, 1957; Bufo macrocristatus Firschein and Smith, 1957; Cranopsis macrocristata (Firschein and Smith, 1957); Ollotis macrocristata (Firschein and Smith, 1957)

Species of amphibian

Incilius macrocristatus (formerly Bufo macrocristatus; common name large-crested toad or huge-crested toad) a species of toad in the family Bufonidae. It is found in Chiapas in southern Mexico and the adjacent Guatemala. Its natural habitats are cloud forests and pine-oak-Liquidambar forests. Breeding takes place in streams. It is a rare species that is threatened by habitat loss caused by agriculture and human settlement, and by water pollution.
