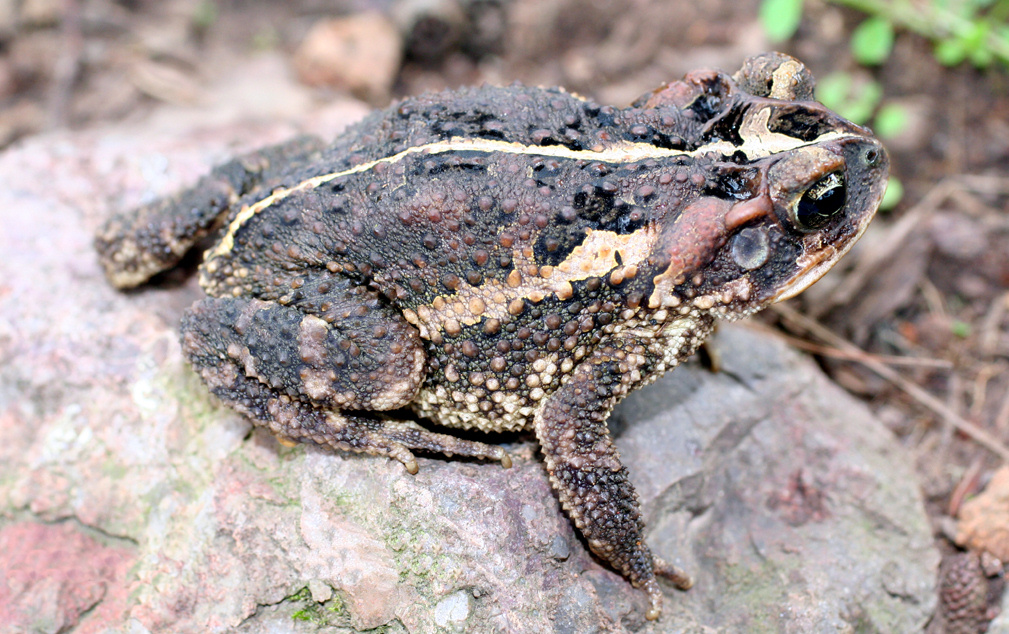

Conservation status
- Least Concern (IUCN 3.1)

Scientific classification
- Kingdom: Animalia
- Phylum: Chordata
- Class: Amphibia
- Order: Anura
- Family: Bufonidae
- Genus: Incilius
- Species: I. porteri

Binomial name
- Incilius porteri Mendelson, Williams, Sheil & Mulcahy, 2005

Synonyms
- Bufo porteri Mendelson, Williams, Sheil, and Mulcahy, 2005; Cranopsis porteri (Mendelson, Williams, Sheil, and Mulcahy, 2005)

= Incilius porteri =

Species of amphibian

Incilius porteri is a species of toads in the family Bufonidae. It is endemic to the Montañas de Comayagua region, Honduras. Its natural habitat is tropical moist montane forests. It is likely threatened by habitat loss and chytridiomycosis.
