= Marie Firmin Bocourt =

French zoologist and artist (1819-1904)

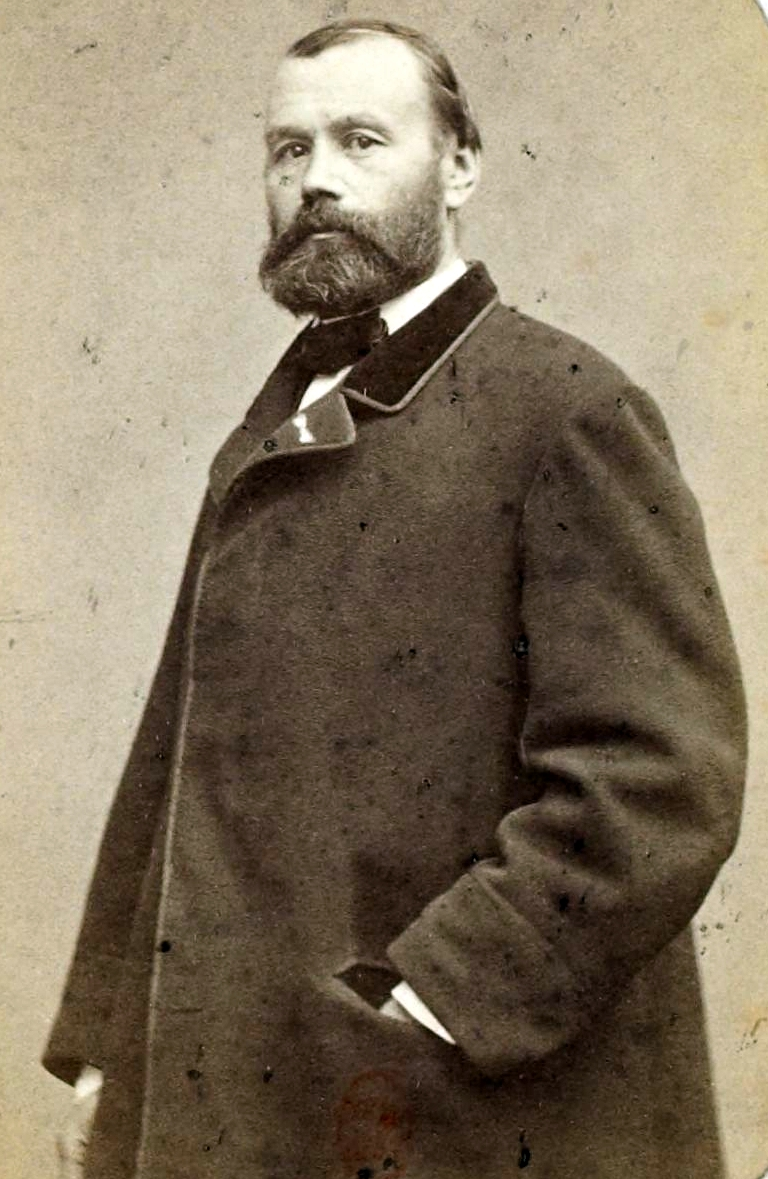
- Marie Firmin Bocourt
- Born: 19 April 1819; Paris, France
- Died: 4 February 1904 (aged 84); Paris, France
- Scientific career
- Fields: Zoology

Marie Firmin Bocourt (19 April 1819 – 4 February 1904) was a French zoologist and artist.

As a young man, he worked as a preparateur for the zoologist Gabriel Bibron (1805–1848), later serving as a museum artist. In 1861, he was sent to Thailand (then called Siam), where he explored the fauna and brought back an important collection of specimens.

He collaborated with Auguste Duméril (1812–1870) on a series called Mission scientifique au Mexique et dans l'Amérique Centrale, a result of Bocourt's scientific expedition to Mexico and Central America in 1864–1866, in one part during the French Intervention in Mexico led by Napoleon III. Auguste Duméril died in 1870, and the project was continued by Bocourt with assistance from Léon Vaillant (1834–1914), François Mocquard (1834–1917) and Fernand Angel (1881–1950). With Vaillant, he published a study on fishes, "Études sur les poissons ", that was included in Mission scientifique au Mexique et dans l'Amérique Centrale.

As an artist, he specialized in engravings, doing portraits of contemporary people as well as zoological illustrations.

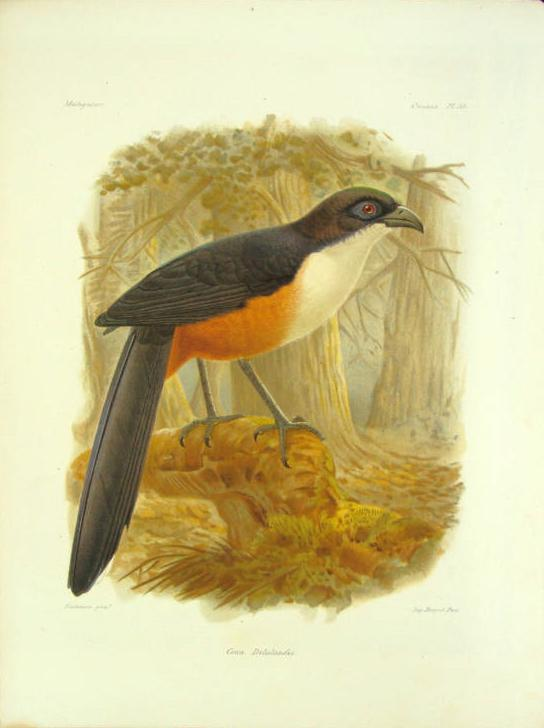
Delalande's coua (Coua delalandei ), chromolithic print by Bocourt et Fagnet, produced for Alfred Grandidier's L'Histoire Politique, Physique et Naturelle de Madagascar.

== Taxa named in honor of Bocourt ==
Bocourt has a number of zoological species and subspecies named after him, including the following.

- Bocourt's swimming crab, Callinectes bocourti A. Milne-Edwards, 1879, native to the Caribbean
- Bocourt's eyelid skink, Phoboscincus bocourti (Brocchi, 1876), native to New Caledonia
- Bocourt's black-headed snake, Tantilla bocourti (Günther, 1895), native to Mexico
- Incilius bocourti (Brocchi, 1877), a Central American toad
- Craugastor bocourti (Brocchi, 1877), a frog native to Guatemala
- Hyla bocourti (Mocquard, 1899), a frog native to Guatemala
- Cincelichthys bocourti (Vaillant & Pellegrin, 1902), a Central American cichlid
- Agama bocourti Rochebrune, 1884, a lizard native to West Africa
- Anolis bocourtii Cope, 1876, a lizard native to northern South America
- Atractus bocourti Boulenger, 1894, a snake native to northwestern South America
- Micrurus bocourti (Jan, 1872), a venomous snake native to northwestern South America
- Mystus bocourti (Bleeker, 1864), a catfish native to Southeast Asia
- Pangasius bocourti Sauvage, 1880, a catfish native to Southeast Asia
- Polemon bocourti Mocquard, 1897, a rear-fanged snake native to Central Africa
- Sceloporus occidentalis bocourtii Boulenger, 1885, a lizard native to California
- Subsessor bocourti (Jan, 1865), a snake native to Southeast Asia

Nota bene: A binomial authority in parentheses indicates that the species was originally described in a different genus.

== Works ==
- Bocourt, F. (1868) Descriptions de quelques crotaliens nouveaux appartenant au genre Bothrops, recueillis dans le Guatemala. Ann. Sci. Nat., Zool., ser. 5, vol. 10, p. 201–202.
- Duméril, A., Bocourt, F. Études sur les reptiles et les batraciens. en la serie "Mission scientifique au Mexique et dans l'Amérique centrale., recherches zoologiques", 3e partie, 1ère section. Paris: Imprimerie Impériale.
- Duméril, A., Bocourt, F. & Mocquard, F. (1870–1909). Mission scientifique au Mexique et dans l'Amérique Centrale. Recherches zoologiques. Paris: Imprimerie Impériale
- Bocourt, F. (1873a) Caractères d'une espèce nouvelle d'iguaniens le Sceleporus acathhinus. [Characters on a New Iguana Species, Sceleporus acathinus] Ann. Sci. Nat., Zool. (5) 17 (6): 1.
- Bocourt, F. (1873b) Deux notes sur quelques sauriens de l'Amérique tropicale. [Two Notes on Its Tropical (Pan-)American Lizards] Ann. Sci. Nat., Zool. Paleontol. (5) 19 (4): 1–5.
- Bocourt, F. (1873c) Note sur quelques espèces nouvelles d'iguaniens du genre Sceleporus. [Notes on the New Iguana Species of the Genre Sceleporus] Ann. Sci. Nat., Zool. (5) 17 (10): 1–2.
- Bocourt, F. (1873–1897) Études sur les reptiles. [Studies on Reptiles] Part 3, Sect. 1, Book. 2–15, pp. 33–860, Mission Scientifique au Mexique et dans l'Amérique Centrale - Recherches Zoologiques. Paris, Imprimerie Imperiale. p. 1012
- Bocourt, F. (1876a) Note sur quelques reptiles du Mexique. [Notes on Its Reptiles of Mexico] Ann. Sci. Nat., Zool. (6) 3 (12): 1–4.
- Bocourt, F. (1876b) Note sur quelques reptiles de l'Isthme de Tehuantepec (Mexique) donnés par M. Sumichrast au Muséum. J. Zool. (Paris) 5: 386–411.
- Bocourt, F. (1879) Etudes sur les reptiles. [Studies on Reptiles] Miss. Sci. Mexique, Rech. Zool. Book. 6: 361–440, p. 21–22, 22A–22D.
