= List of amphibians of New Mexico =

This is a list of amphibians of New Mexico: all frogs, toads, and salamanders native to the U.S. state of New Mexico.

New Mexico has extreme biomes, having mountain ranges down the east and west sides of the state, with forests in the west, desert in the central and eastern regions, and grasslands in the northeast near the border of Oklahoma. Despite its relatively, overall arid climate, it is home to a variety of amphibians.

New Mexico only protects a single species of amphibian, the Chiricahua leopard frog (Rana chiricahuensis). It is considered to be a threatened species.

== Toads ==
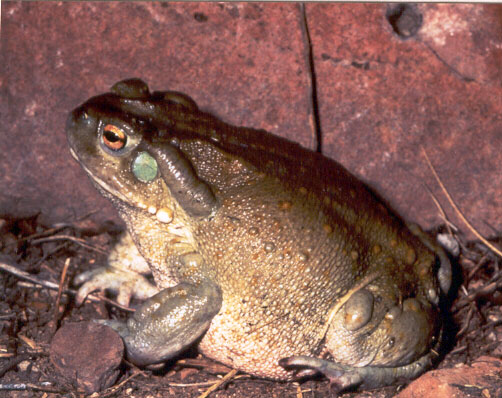
Colorado River toad

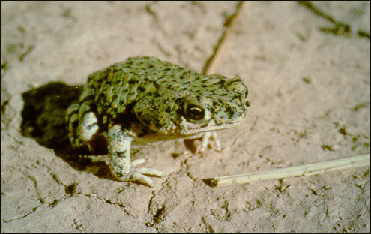
Green toad

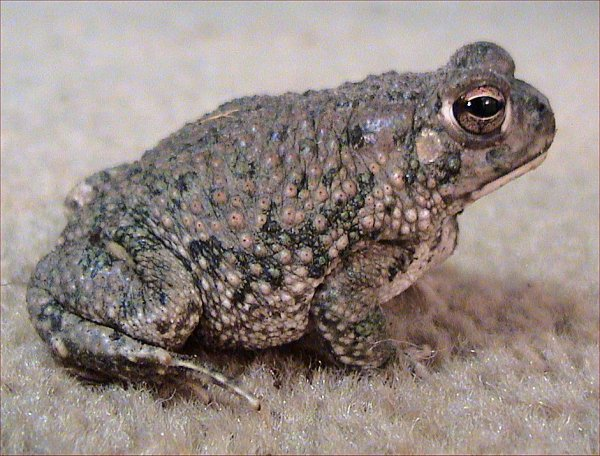
Texas toad

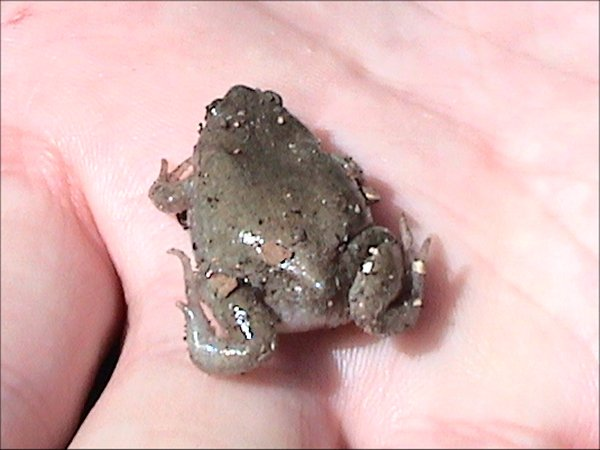
Great Plains narrowmouth toad

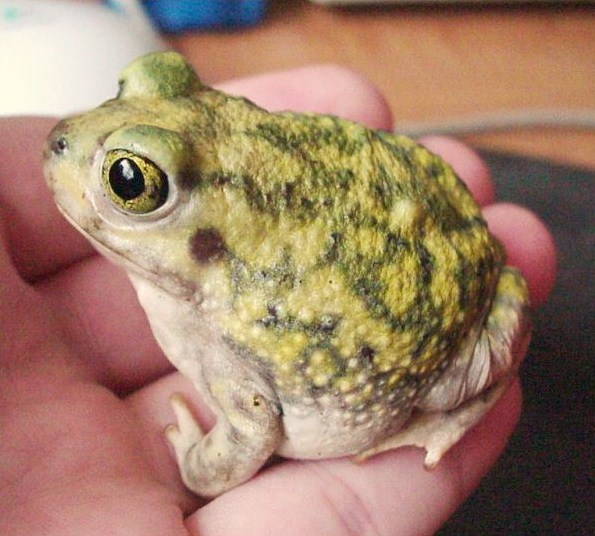
Couch's spadefoot toad

=== True toads ===
Family Bufonidae (true toads)

- Genus Bufo (toads)
  - Bufo alvarius (Colorado River toad)
  - Bufo boreas (western toad)
  - Bufo cognatus (Great Plains toad)
  - Bufo debilis (green toad)
  - Bufo microscaphus (southwestern toad)
  - Bufo punctatus (red-spotted toad)
  - Bufo speciosus (Texas toad)
  - Bufo woodhousii (Woodhouse's toad)

=== Narrowmouth toads ===
Family Microhylidae (narrowmouth toads)

- Genus Gastrophryne
  - Gastrophryne olivacea (Great Plains narrowmouth toad)

=== Spadefoot toads ===
Family Scaphiopodidae (spadefoot toads)

- Genus Scaphiopus (spadefoot toads)
  - Scaphiopus couchii (Couch's spadefoot toad)
- Genus Spea (western spadefoot toads)
  - Spea bombifrons (Plains spadefoot toad)
  - Spea multiplicata (New Mexico spadefoot toad)

== Frogs ==
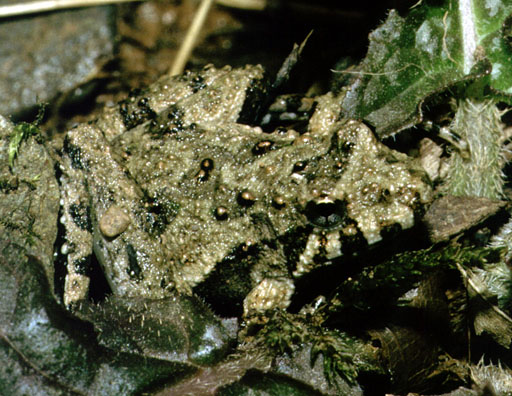
Northern cricket frog

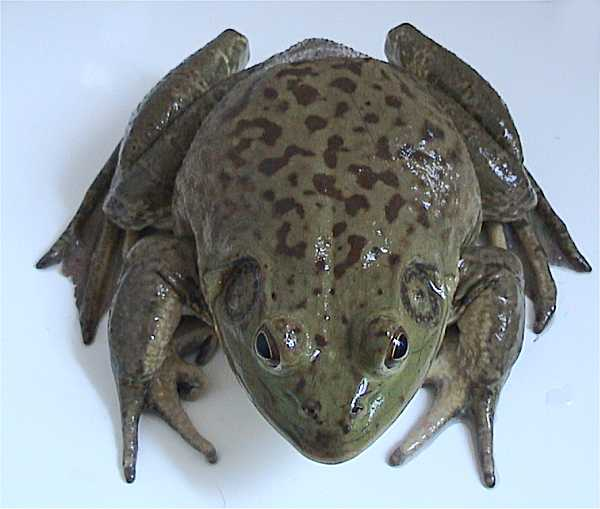
American bullfrog

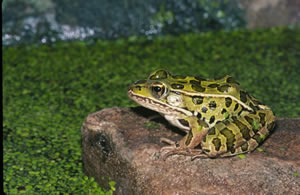
Northern leopard frog

=== Tree frogs ===
Family Hylidae (tree frogs)

- Genus Acris (cricket frogs)
  - Acris crepitans (northern cricket frog)
- Genus Hyla (tree frogs)
  - Hyla arenicolor (canyon tree frog)
  - Hyla eximia (mountain tree frog)
- Genus Pseudacris (chorus frogs)
  - Pseudacris triseriata (western chorus frog)

=== Barking frogs ===
Family Leptodactylidae (tropical frogs)

- Genus Eleutherodactylus (chirping frogs)
  - Eleutherodactylus augusti (eastern barking frog)

=== True frogs ===
Family Ranidae (true frogs)

- Genus Rana (true frogs)
  - Rana catesbeiana (bullfrog)
  - Rana berlandieri (Rio Grande leopard frog)
  - Rana blairi (Plains leopard frog)
  - Rana chiricahuensis (Chiricahua leopard frog) (T)
  - Rana pipiens (northern leopard frog)

== Salamanders ==
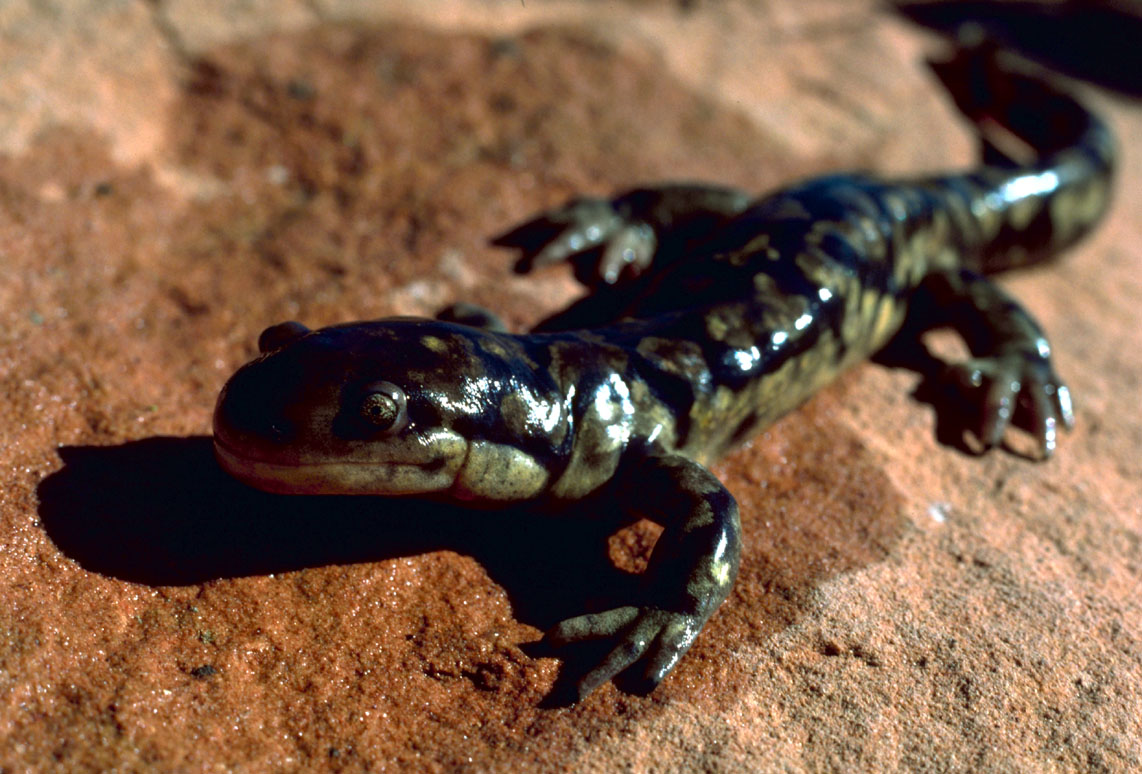
Tiger salamander

=== Mole salamanders ===
Family Ambystomatidae (mole salamanders)

- Genus Ambystoma
  - Ambystoma tigrinum (tiger salamander)

=== Lungless salamanders ===
Family Plethodontidae (lungless salamanders)

- Genus Aneides (climbing salamanders)
  - Aneides hardii (Sacramento Mountain salamander)
- Genus Plethodon (woodland salamanders)
  - Plethodon neomexicanus (Jemez Mountains salamander)
