= Hot Creek toad =

Conservation status
- Critically Endangered (IUCN 3.1)

Scientific classification
- Kingdom: Animalia
- Phylum: Chordata
- Class: Amphibia
- Order: Anura
- Family: Bufonidae
- Genus: Anaxyrus
- Species: A. monfontanus

Binomial name
- Anaxyrus monfontanus (Gordon, Simandle, Sandmeier & Tracy, 2020)

Synonyms
- Bufo monfontanus

Species of toad

The Hot Creek toad (Anaxyrus monfontanus) is a species of toad in the family Bufonidae. It is endemic to Nye County in the state of Nevada in the United States.

== Taxonomy ==
It was formerly considered an isolated population of the common western toad (A. boreas) until morphological and phylogenetic analyses found it to be a separate species, and described it as such (alongside the Railroad Valley toad, A. nevadensis) in 2020. The Dixie Valley toad (A. williamsi) was described a few years earlier for the same reasons. Hydrological analysis indicates that the White River likely had a historical connection to the Colorado River, allowing western toads from modern-day Colorado and Utah to disperse into the southern Great Basin; changes in river flow led to this isolation of these populations and allowed them to diverge into A. monfontanus and A. nevadensis.

== Distribution and habitat ==
It is known only from the Hot Creek Canyon, a narrow east-to-west canyon in the Hot Creek Range in Nye County, Nevada. Here, it inhabits marsh habitats fed by hot springs. This is an extremely restricted and remote habitat surrounded otherwise by sagebrush steppe, restricting toad dispersal.

== Description ==
It is one of the smallest species in the A. boreas species complex, with only A. williamsi being smaller. It can be distinguished from A. boreas by its shorter head and limbs, large parotoid glands, and weakly warted body. It has an olive gray coloration with brown warts and black flecks across the dorsum.

== Threats ==
Very little is known about the population size, reproduction, and dispersal of this species, warranting major conservation concern. The American bullfrog (Lithobates catesbianus), which outcompetes and preys upon much smaller frogs and toads, in addition to being a major vector of chytridomycosis, has been introduced to the habitat of this species, which is likely a major factor in its endangerment and rarity.
