= Railroad Valley toad =

Conservation status
- Vulnerable (IUCN 3.1)

- Critically Imperiled (NatureServe)

Scientific classification
- Kingdom: Animalia
- Phylum: Chordata
- Class: Amphibia
- Order: Anura
- Family: Bufonidae
- Genus: Anaxyrus
- Species: A. nevadensis

Binomial name
- Anaxyrus nevadensis (Gordon, Simandle, Sandmeier & Tracy, 2020)

Synonyms
- Bufo nevadensis

Species of toad

The Railroad Valley toad (Anaxyrus nevadensis) is a species of toad in the family Bufonidae. It is endemic to Nye County in the state of Nevada in the United States.

== Taxonomy ==
It was formerly considered an isolated population of the common western toad (A. boreas) until morphological and phylogenetic analyses found it to be a separate species, and described it as such (alongside the Hot Creek toad, A. monfontanus) in 2020. The Dixie Valley toad (A. williamsi) was described a few years earlier for the same reasons. Phylogenetic evidence indicates that A. nevadensis and A. monfontanus are more closely related to A. boreas from modern-day Colorado and Utah than they are to any other members of the complex; hydrological analysis indicates that this may be because the White River and Colorado River likely had a historical connection, allowing western toads from those regions to colonize the southern Great Basin, and diverging into distinct species when the area dried up.

== Distribution and habitat ==
It is endemic to the spring-fed wetlands of Lockes Ranch in Railroad Valley, Nye County, Nevada. This is an extremely restricted and remote habitat surrounded otherwise by sagebrush steppe, restricting toad dispersal.

== Description ==
It is one of the smallest species in the A. boreas species complex. It can be distinguished from A. boreas by its longer head and limbs, shorter and more narrow parotoid glands, and distinctive mottling on the undersides. It is brownish gray in coloration, flecked with dark brown, irregular spots.

== Threats ==
Railroad Valley is Nevada's primary oil reservoir and the majority of the state's petroleum production comes from here. These extractive activities are of major threat to the species, compounded by its severely restricted range. The toad would be imperiled even more by further anthropogenic modifications that would degrade its habitat.
