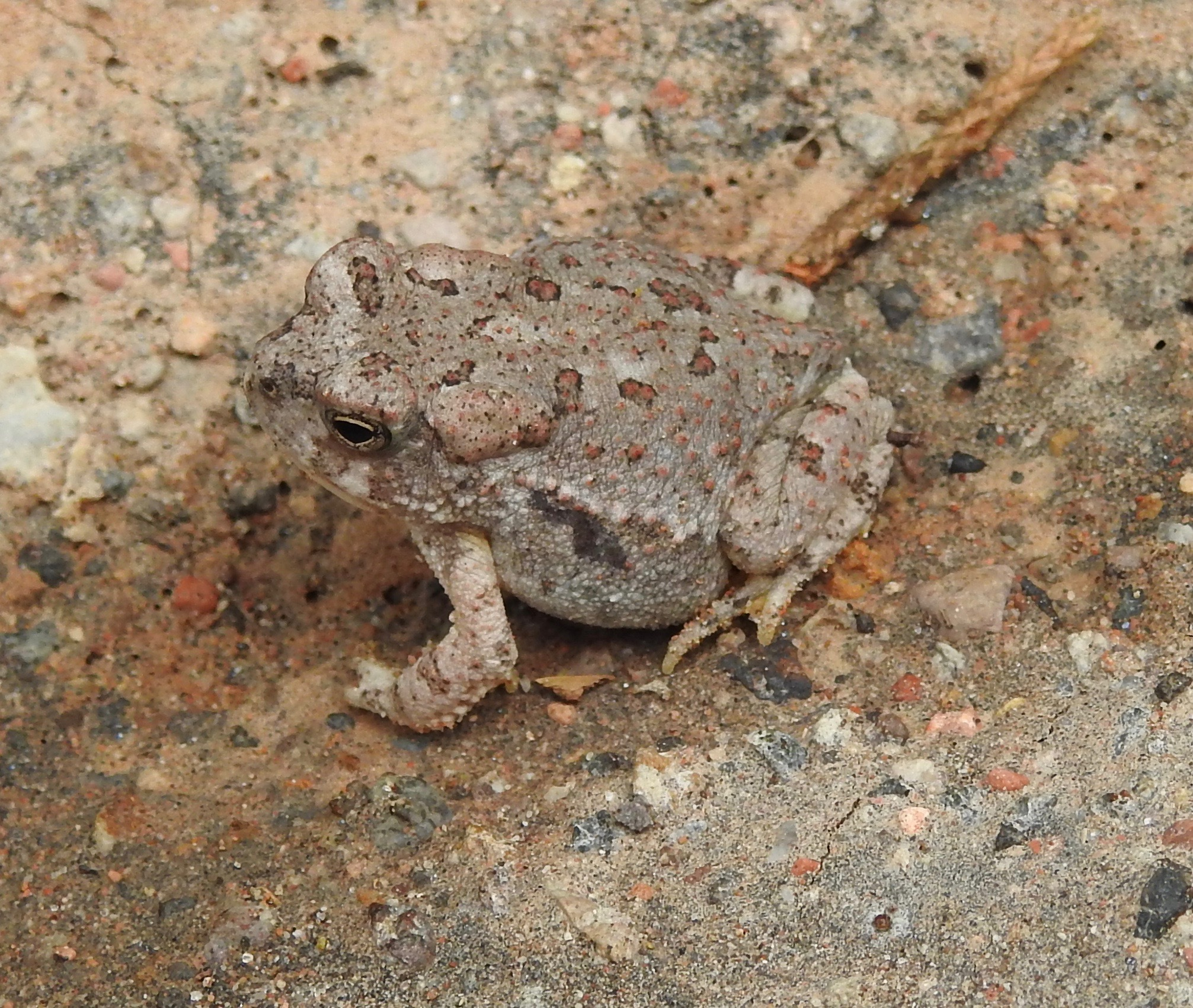

Conservation status
- Least Concern (IUCN 3.1)

Scientific classification
- Kingdom: Animalia
- Phylum: Chordata
- Class: Amphibia
- Order: Anura
- Family: Bufonidae
- Genus: Anaxyrus
- Species: A. microscaphus

Binomial name
- Anaxyrus microscaphus (Cope, 1867)

Synonyms
- Bufo microscaphus Cope, 1867

= Arizona toad =

Species of amphibian

The Arizona toad (Anaxyrus microscaphus) is a species of toad in the family Bufonidae. It is endemic to the south-western United States, where its natural habitats are temperate lowland forests, rivers and streams, swamps, freshwater marshes, freshwater springs, ponds, open excavations, irrigated land, and seasonally flooded agricultural land.

== Taxonomy ==
The Arizona toad was first described by the American herpetologist Edward Drinker Cope in 1867. He named it Bufo microscaphus and the type locality was Fort Mohave, Arizona. It was commonly known as the southwestern toad and for many years, three subspecies were recognized, B. m. microscaphus, B. m. californicus and B. m. mexicanus. In 1998, the American herpetologist A. W. E. Gergus raised all three to full species status on the basis of allozyme evidence, allopatry and morphology. The large genus Bufo was split by Frost et al. in 2006, with the North American species being included in the genus Anaxyrus.

== Description ==
The Arizona toad grows to a snout-to-vent length of 53 to 79 mm (2 to 3 in). The dorsal colour is variable but is often gray or beige with reddish-brown warts. The parotoid glands are oval and widely separated and there is often a pale stripe or patch on the head or spine. Juveniles are often salmon-coloured or greenish-brown.

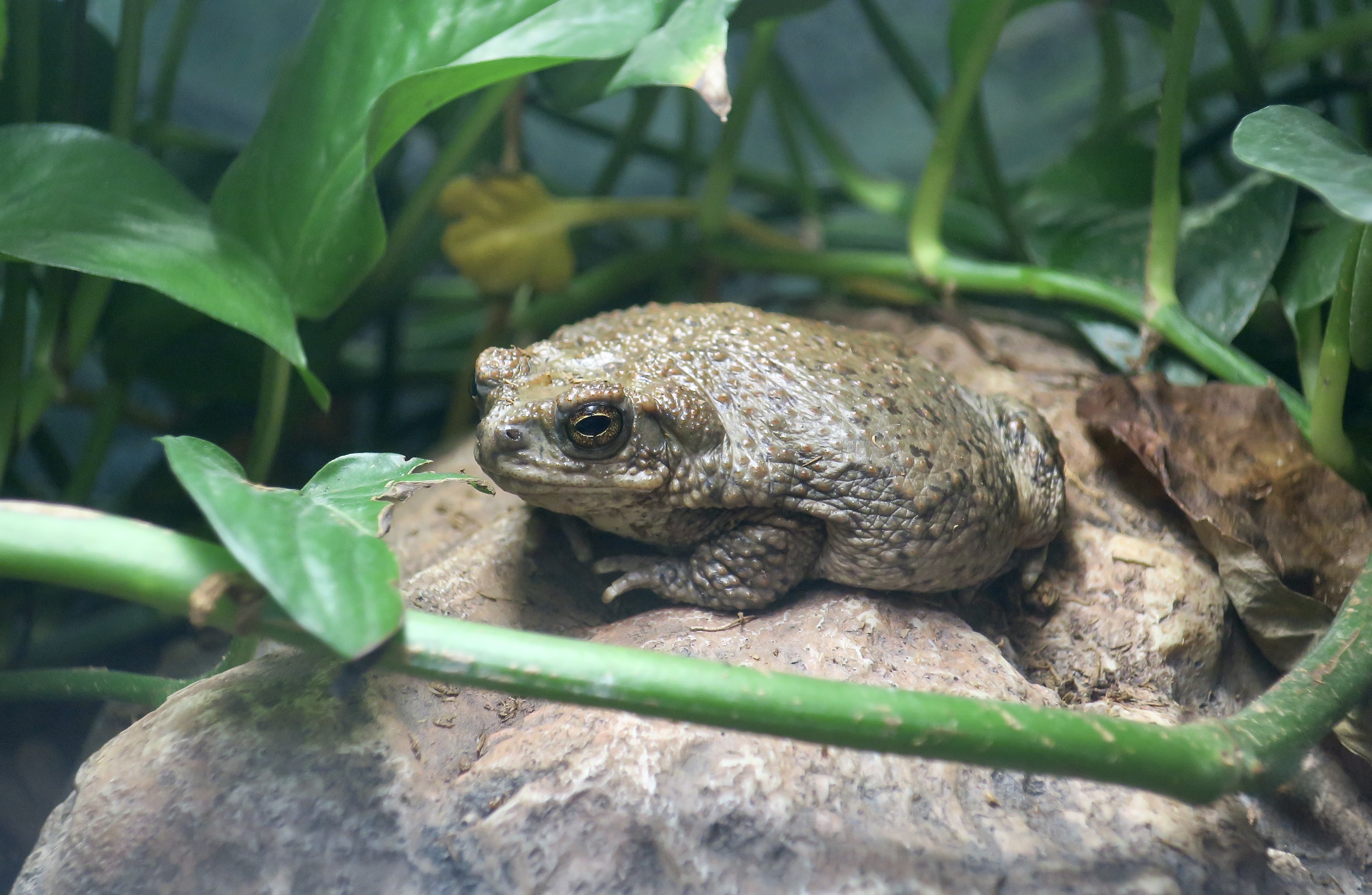
An Arizona toad at Phoenix Herpetological Sanctuary.

== Distribution and habitat ==
This species' range is continuous along the Virgin River and its tributaries in southwestern Utah, and southern Nevada, and in locations across Arizona and western New Mexico. It is a protected species in Utah, Nevada and Arizona. Protected populations occur in the Virgin River and its tributaries in Zion National Park. The toads are usually found in sandy areas within about 100 metres (330 ft) of streams, often in locations with flood channels and dense clumps of willow, or on nearby sandy terraces with live oaks and cottonwoods. In Arizona and New Mexico they sometimes occur at higher altitudes, up to about 2,000 metres (6,600 ft) in forested areas in riparian corridors during rainy periods in summer. They also move into irrigated fields after the breeding season is over, and are found around reservoirs, ponds and other impounded areas.

== Behavior ==
Breeding takes place in backwaters, the edges of streams and side-pools. Trees and shrubs growing at the streamside include Fremont's cottonwood (Populus fremontii), willows (Salix spp.), and seep willows (Baccharis salicifolia). Breeding starts in late February in Arizona but does not commence at higher altitudes in Arizona and in Utah until several weeks later. The male's call is a trill lasting about six seconds. Calling males are often outnumbered by satellite males which opportunistically mate with approaching females. Amplexus takes place and a clutch of about 4,500 eggs is laid in shallow water. The eggs take three to six days to hatch and the development period of the tadpoles before metamorphosis depends largely on the water temperature. The tadpoles probably feed on algae and other organisms attached to underwater surfaces but the diet of adults has not been studied. The toads are nocturnal, spending the day in sandy burrows. They enter a state of torpor and remain underground from about September to February. They may live for four or five years and the main cause of mortality is probably predation, with raccoons (Procyon lotor), a medium-sized plover the killdeer (Charadrius vociferus), and the wandering garter snake (Thamnophis elegans vagrans) feeding on the toads.

== Status ==
The population size of the Arizona toad is believed to be decreasing at a slow rate, probably due to human disturbance of their habitat, and in some localities, such as central Arizona, they are being replaced by Woodhouse's toad (Anaxyrus woodhousii). One threat faced by the Arizona toad is hybridization between these two species. They occupy similar habitat but theoretically should not hybridise because they breed at different seasons. However the male Arizona toad has occasionally been observed to mate with the female Woodhouse's toad. The Arizona toad has also been known to attempt mating with the Great Basin spadefoot toad (Spea intermontana), the Great Plains toad (Bufo cognatus), the red-spotted toad (Bufo punctatus), the canyon tree frog (Hyla arenicolor), the American bullfrog (Lithobates catesbeiana), and the lowland leopard frog (Lithobates yavapaiensis). The Arizona toad has a wide range and is assumed to have a large total population. It is an adaptable species and able to tolerate some degree of habitat modification so the International Union for Conservation of Nature has assessed it as being of "least concern".
