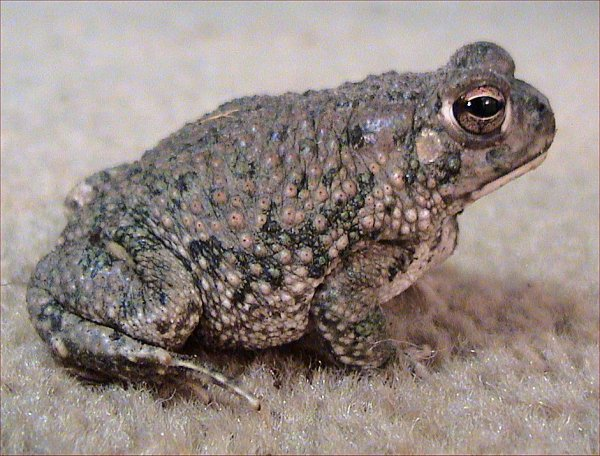

Conservation status
- Least Concern (IUCN 3.1)

Scientific classification
- Kingdom: Animalia
- Phylum: Chordata
- Class: Amphibia
- Order: Anura
- Family: Bufonidae
- Genus: Anaxyrus
- Species: A. speciosus

Binomial name
- Anaxyrus speciosus (Girard, 1854)

Synonyms
- Bufo speciosus Girard, 1854

= Texas toad =

Species of amphibian

The Texas toad (Anaxyrus speciosus) is a species of medium-sized (to 9 cm (3.5 in)) toad that occurs in the southern United States and northern Mexico. It breeds in temporary water pools after heavy rains.

== Distribution and habitat ==
The Texas toad is native to the United States where it is found in the state of Texas, wherein 2009 it was designated as the Texas State Amphibian, its range also extends northward to Oklahoma, westward to New Mexico and southward to northern Mexico. It is a desert species and is found in dry grassland, savannahs with scattered mesquite and open woodland, usually on sandy or frequently inundated soils.

== Description ==
Males measure 52–78 mm (2.0–3.1 in) and females 54–91 mm (2.1–3.6 in) in snout–vent length.

== Ecology ==
The Texas toad feeds on insects such as beetles, ants and bugs. It digs a burrow in soft soil and can bury itself in mud. It sometimes conceals itself in a gopher burrow, under a log or in a deep crack in the mud to prevent desiccation, spending much of its time dormant in prolonged dry weather.

Breeding occurs after heavy rains when male frogs congregate at temporary pools, ditches, cattle tanks and other wet places and call continuously, especially at night. The call is described as being a "series of explosive trills", each lasting for about one and a half seconds with intervals of one second. The females seem to be attracted to the largest males with the loudest calls. The eggs are laid in the water, often entangled in submerged vegetation. They hatch in two days and the tadpoles feed on algae growing on underwater plants. They may retreat to deeper water when disturbed. They spend between eighteen and sixty days as tadpoles depending on circumstances such as water temperature, after which time they undergo metamorphosis and leave the water as juvenile toads.

Other toads using the same water bodies for breeding include the Gulf Coast toad (Incilius nebulifer), the green toad (Anaxyrus debilis), the Great Plains narrow-mouthed toad (Gastrophryne olivacea) and Couch's spadefoot toad (Scaphiopus couchii). The Texas toad sometimes hybridizes with Woodhouse's toad (Anaxyrus woodhousii) or the Great Plains toad (Anaxyrus cognatus).

== Predation ==
Texas toads are eaten by boat-tailed grackles, larvae of Dytiscidae and Hydrophilidae, and yellow mud turtles. Multiple species of garter snakes can prey on adults.

== Status ==
The Texas toad has a wide range and a large total population and is one of the most common toads in the southern United States. It is tolerant of changes in its habitat and is present in cultivated areas as well as grasslands and savannahs. No particular threats have been identified and the International Union for Conservation of Nature has assessed it as being of "least concern".

== Reference Photos ==
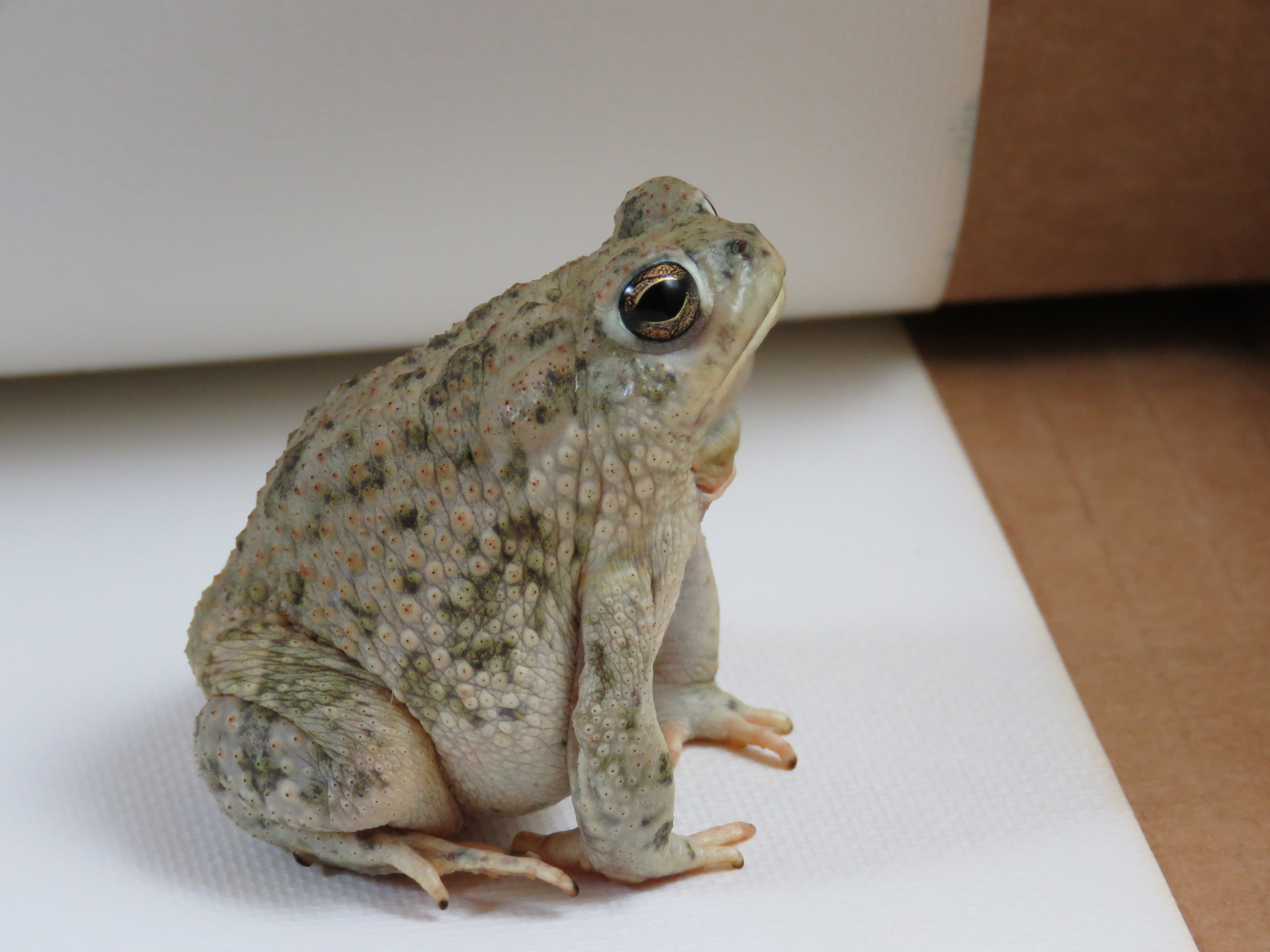
Texas Toad, lateral view, Val Verde Co., Texas.

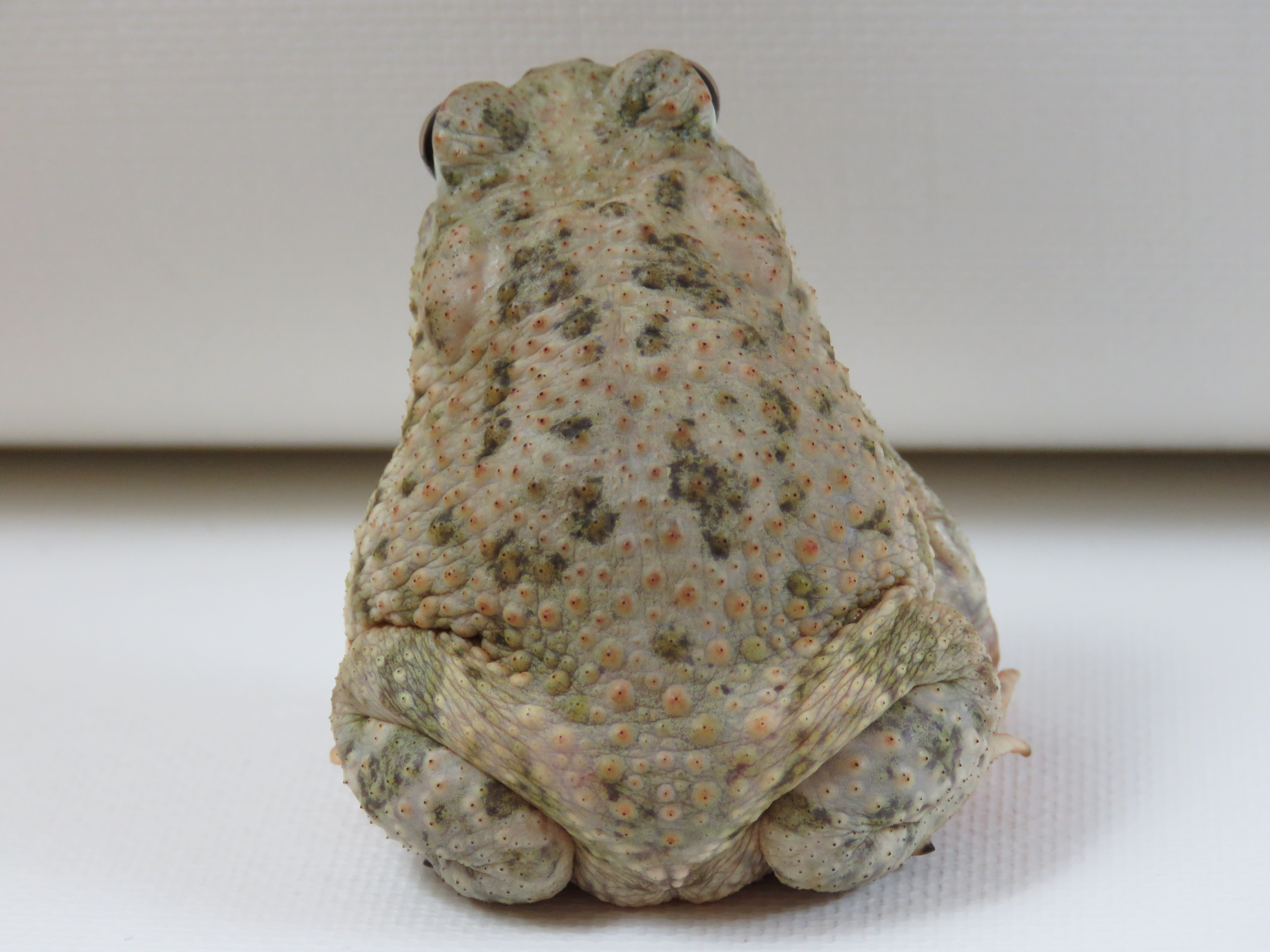
Texas Toad, dorsal view, Val Verde Co., Texas.
