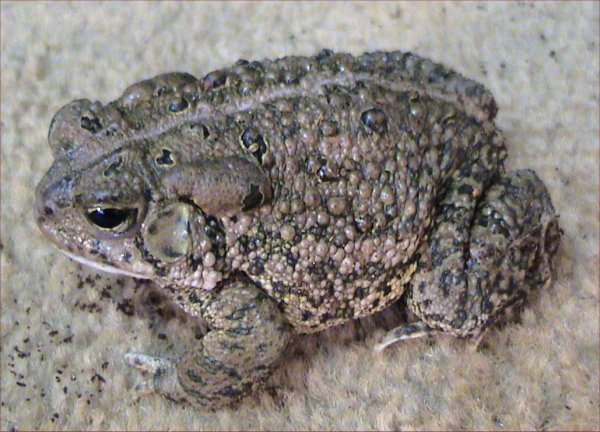
- Woodhouse's toad (Anaxyrus woodhousii)
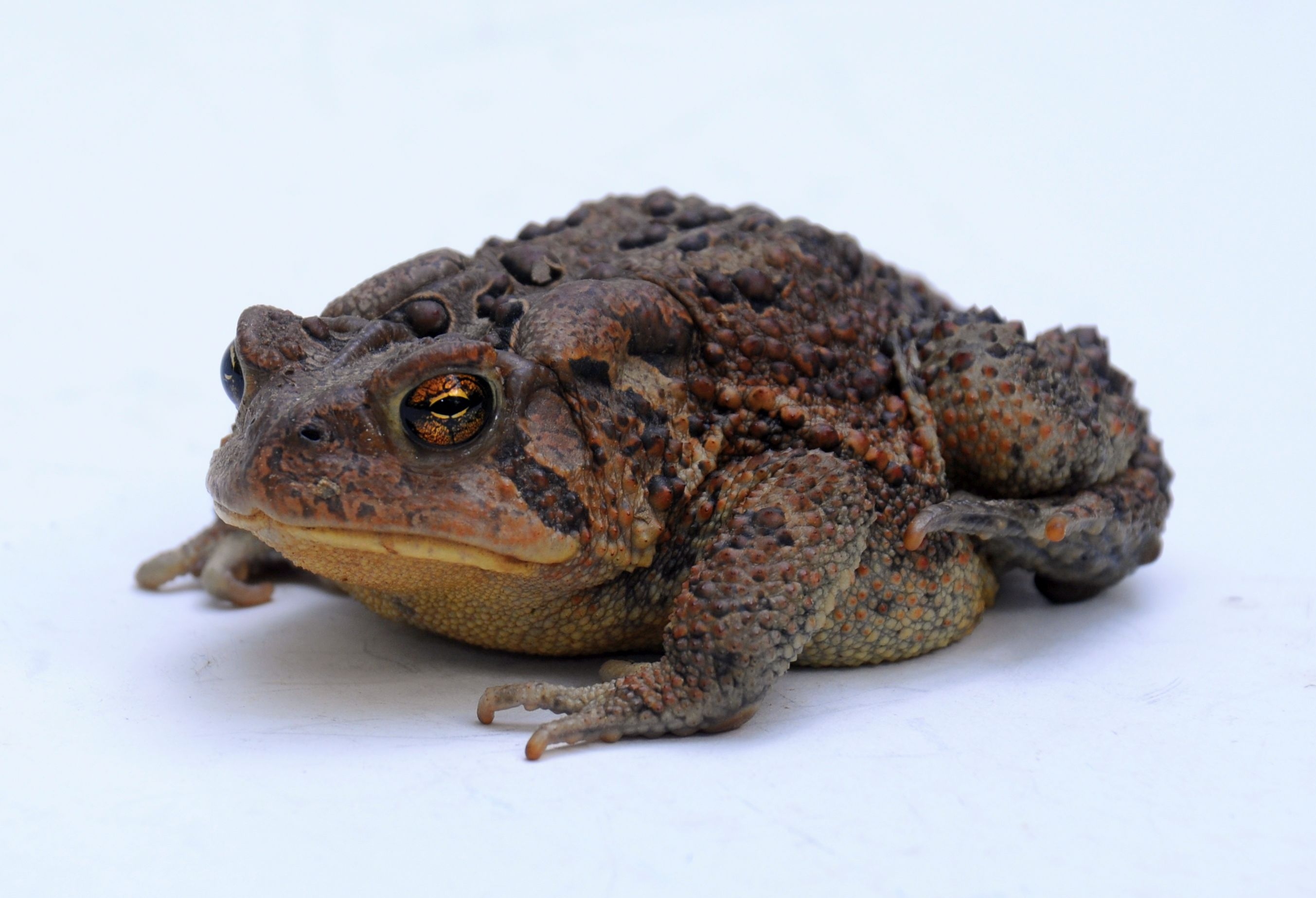
- American toad (Anaxyrus americanus)

Scientific classification
- Kingdom: Animalia
- Phylum: Chordata
- Class: Amphibia
- Order: Anura
- Family: Bufonidae
- Genus: Anaxyrus; Tschudi, 1845

Species
- 25, see text.

= Anaxyrus =

Anaxyrus Temporal range: Middle Miocene–present

Genus of true toads in the family Bufonidae

Anaxyrus, containing the North American toads, is a genus of true toads in the family Bufonidae. The genus is endemic to North and Central America, and contains many familiar North American toad species such as the American toad, Woodhouse's toad, and the western toad.

Most species in this genus were initially classified in Bufo, but were split due to their genetic divergence and geographic separation. Some authorities still consider Anaxyrus to be a subgenus within Bufo. However, other authorities have disputed this classification, as doing so would also require all morphologically distinct Old World toad species to also be placed in Bufo.

== Species ==
Binomial name	Described by, year	Common name
Anaxyrus americanus ↔ Bufo americanus	Holbrook, 1836	American toad
Anaxyrus baxteri ↔ Bufo baxteri	Porter, 1968	Wyoming toad
Anaxyrus boreas ↔ Bufo boreas	Baird & Girard, 1852	western toad
Anaxyrus californicus ↔ Bufo californicus	Camp, 1915	arroyo toad
Anaxyrus canorus ↔ Bufo canorus	Camp, 1916	Yosemite toad
Anaxyrus cognatus ↔ Bufo cognatus	Say, 1823	Great Plains toad
Anaxyrus compactilis ↔ Bufo compactilis	Wiegmann, 1833	plateau toad, Texas toad
Anaxyrus debilis ↔ Bufo debilis	Girard, 1854	North American green toad
Anaxyrus exsul ↔ Bufo exsul	G. Myers, 1942	black toad
Anaxyrus fowleri ↔ Bufo fowleri	Hinckley, 1882	Fowler's toad
Anaxyrus hemiophrys ↔ Bufo hemiophrys	Cope, 1886	Canadian toad
Anaxyrus houstonensis ↔ Bufo houstonensis	Sanders, 1953	Houston toad
Anaxyrus kelloggi ↔ Bufo kelloggi	Taylor, 1938	little Mexican toad
Anaxyrus mexicanus ↔ Bufo mexicanus	Brocchi, 1879	southwestern toad
Anaxyrus microscaphus ↔ Bufo microscaphus	Cope, 1867	Arizona toad
Anaxyrus monfontanus ↔ Bufo monfontanus	Gordon, Simandle, Sandmeier & Tracy, 2020	Hot Creek toad
Anaxyrus nelsoni ↔ Bufo nelsoni	Stejneger, 1893	Amargosa toad
Anaxyrus nevadensis ↔ Bufo nevadensis	Gordon, Simandle, Sandmeier & Tracy, 2020	Railroad Valley toad
Anaxyrus punctatus ↔ Bufo punctatus	Baird & Girard, 1852	red-spotted toad, Baird's spotted toad
Anaxyrus quercicus ↔ Bufo quercicus	Holbrook, 1840	oak toad
Anaxyrus retiformis ↔ Bufo retiformis	Sanders and H.M. Smith, 1951	Sonoran green toad
Anaxyrus speciosus ↔ Bufo speciosus	Girard, 1854	Texas toad
Anaxyrus terrestris ↔ Bufo terrestris	Bonnaterre, 1789	southern toad
Anaxyrus williamsi ↔ Bufo williamsi	Gordon, Simandle, and Tracy, 2017	Dixie Valley toad
Anaxyrus woodhousii ↔ Bufo woodhousii	Girard, 1854	Woodhouse's toad

The following fossil taxa are also known, all of which were also previously placed in Bufo:

- †Anaxyrus defensor (Meylan, 2005) (Pliocene/early Pleistocene of Florida)
- †Anaxyrus hibbardi (Taylor, 1937) (Late Miocene of Kansas)
- †Anaxyrus pliocompactilis (Wilson, 1968) (Late Miocene of Kansas, possibly synonymous with Anaxyrus compactilis or Anaxyrus speciosus)
- †Anaxyrus repentinus (Tihen, 1962) (Mid-Late Pleistocene (Rancholabrean) of Kansas, possibly synonymous with Anaxyrus woodhousii or Anaxyrus cognatus)
- †Anaxyrus rexroadensis (Tihen, 1962) (Pliocene/early Pleistocene of Kansas)
- †Anaxyrus spongifrons (Tihen, 1962) (Late Miocene of Kansas)
- †Anaxyrus suspectus (Tihen, 1962) (Pliocene/early Pleistocene (Blancan) of Kansas)
- †Anaxyrus tiheni (Auffenberg, 1957) (Late Miocene of Florida)
- †Anaxyrus valentinensis (Estes & Tihen, 1964) (Middle Miocene (Barstovian) of Nebraska)
