= Sonoran green toad =

Conservation status
- Least Concern (IUCN 3.1)

Scientific classification
- Domain: Eukaryota
- Kingdom: Animalia
- Phylum: Chordata
- Class: Amphibia
- Order: Anura
- Family: Bufonidae
- Genus: Anaxyrus
- Species: A. retiformis

Binomial name
- Anaxyrus retiformis (Sanders & Smith, 1951)

Synonyms
- Bufo debilis retiformis Sanders & Smith, 1951; Bufo retiformis Sanders & Smith, 1951

Species of amphibian

The Sonoran green toad (Anaxyrus retiformis; in Spanish "sapo verde de Sonora" or "sapo verde sonorense") is a species of toad in the family Bufonidae. It is found in northern Mexico and the southwestern United States.

== Distribution and habitat ==
The Sonoran green toad is endemic to the counties of Pima and Pinal in Arizona in the south western United States and to northern Mexico. In the United States its range extends from near Mobile southwards to the San Cristobal Wash and the Organ Pipe Cactus National Monument and eastwards to the Mission San Xavier del Bac and the Altar Valley. In Mexico its range is from the west-central part of Sonora State northwards. Its altitudinal range is from 150 to 900 metres (490 to 2,950 ft). Its typical habitat is arid and semi-arid plains with grass, creosote bush, mesquite and saguaro.

== Behavior ==
The Sonoran green toad is nocturnal and little is known of its behavior outside the breeding season. It is thought that it may be fossorial, living underground for most of the year and emerging only in wet conditions, and it is not clear whether or not it estivates. Breeding takes place in July and August, the males appearing at breeding sites one to two days after heavy rain has fallen. The sites chosen are ditches, temporary pools, creek beds and cattle tanks. The males call from low vegetation within a few metres of the water. The call has been described as resembling "the buzzer on an electric alarm clock". When a female arrives in response to the male, they move together into the water, amplexus occurs and a batch of eggs is laid. The temporary waterbodies tend to dry up rapidly and it is thought that the eggs hatch within three days and the tadpoles develop to metamorphosis in two to three weeks.

== Status ==
The Sonoran green toad is inactive for about ten months of the year so information on it is limited. The population is believed to be stable as it has been redetected in most of its historic locations and has been discovered in a number of new ones. Females are sometimes collected for the pet trade or research but otherwise it faces few particular threats and increased irrigation may create new habitats. The International Union for Conservation of Nature has assessed its conservation status as being of "least concern".
