= Dixie Valley =

Basin in Churchill and Pershing counties in Nevada, United States

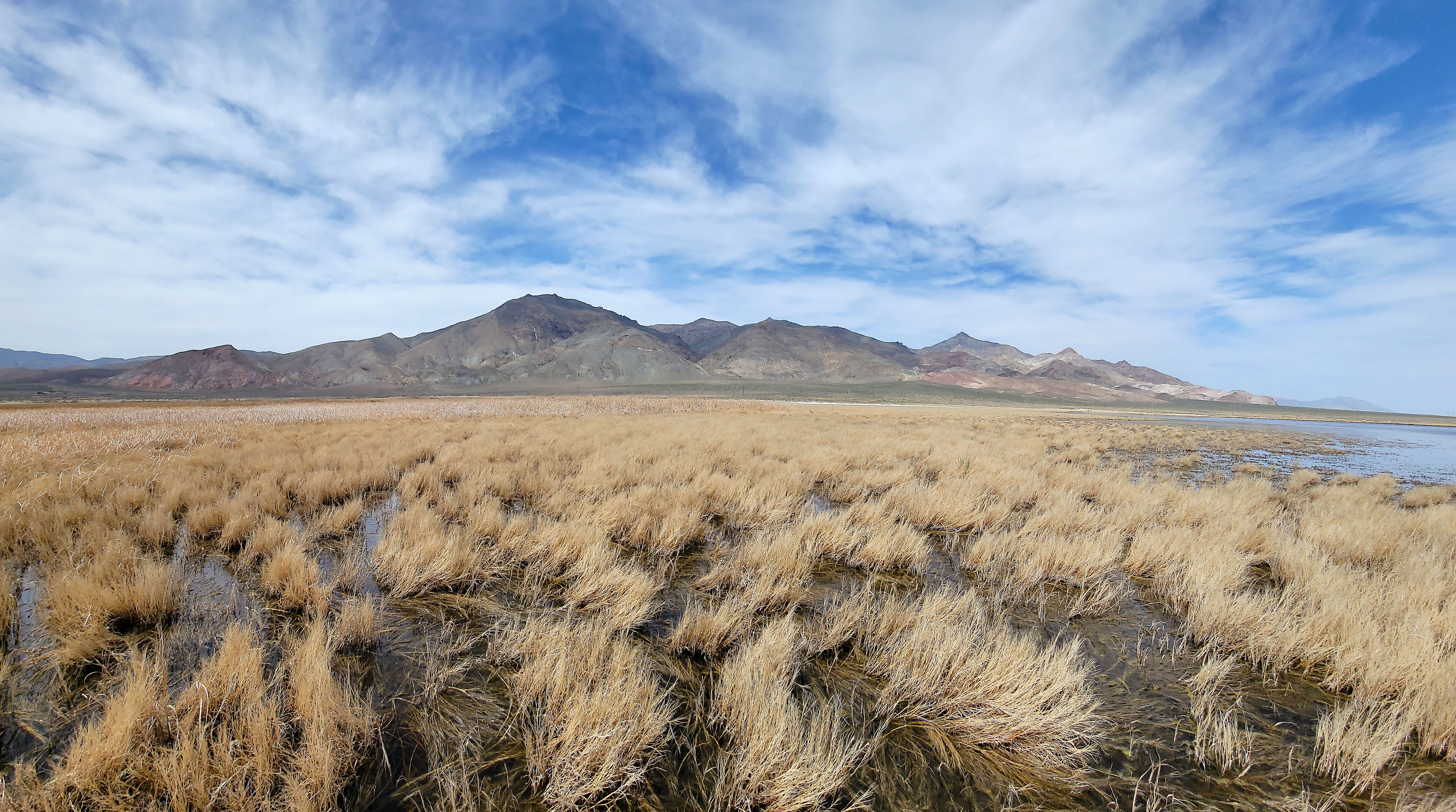
- Looking across the Dixie Valley, April 2022

- Location within Nevada
- Area: 2,990 mi^{2} (7,700 km^{2})

Geography
- State: Nevada
- Borders on: West: Stillwater Range; East: Clan Alpine Mountains; South: Pirouette Mountain
- Coordinates: 39°41′16″N 118°04′50″W
- Interactive map of Dixie Valley

The Dixie Valley is an endorheic basin in Churchill and Pershing counties in Nevada, United States, which had plentiful ground water (free-flowing artesian wells) around which ranches were built.

== Description ==
Prior to the US Navy TOPGUN school moving from California to Nevada, the valley was purchased in 1995 for $100 million and is used as an electronic warfare range for nearby Fallon Naval Air Station.

The watershed has a floor of greater than 3,000 ft (910 m) elevation which has both the Lahontan Salt Shrub Basin and Lahontan Playa ecoregions of the Central Basin and Range. At higher elevations the area has Lahontan Sagebrush Slope (west) and Central Nevada High Valley (east) ecoregions that respectively transition to the mountainous Lahontan Upland and Central Nevada Mid-Slope Woodland & Brushland ecoregions (the latter's summits are Central Nevada Bald Mountain ecoregions). Dixie Valley is distinguished from all of the other valleys in West Central Nevada because it sits at approximately 3300 feet at its lowest point, while even the lowest of the rest of the surrounding valleys are at least at 3800 feet. The Dixie Valley toad is an endemic species in the area.

== Dixie Valley military range ==
The military range in Dixie Valley is part of the Fallon Range Training Complex (FRTC) and contains a simulated air defense network, including approximately 20 operational radar installations and many demilitarized armored vehicles have been scattered throughout the area. Most of this area is publicly accessible, with the exception of areas immediately surrounding the radar installations.
