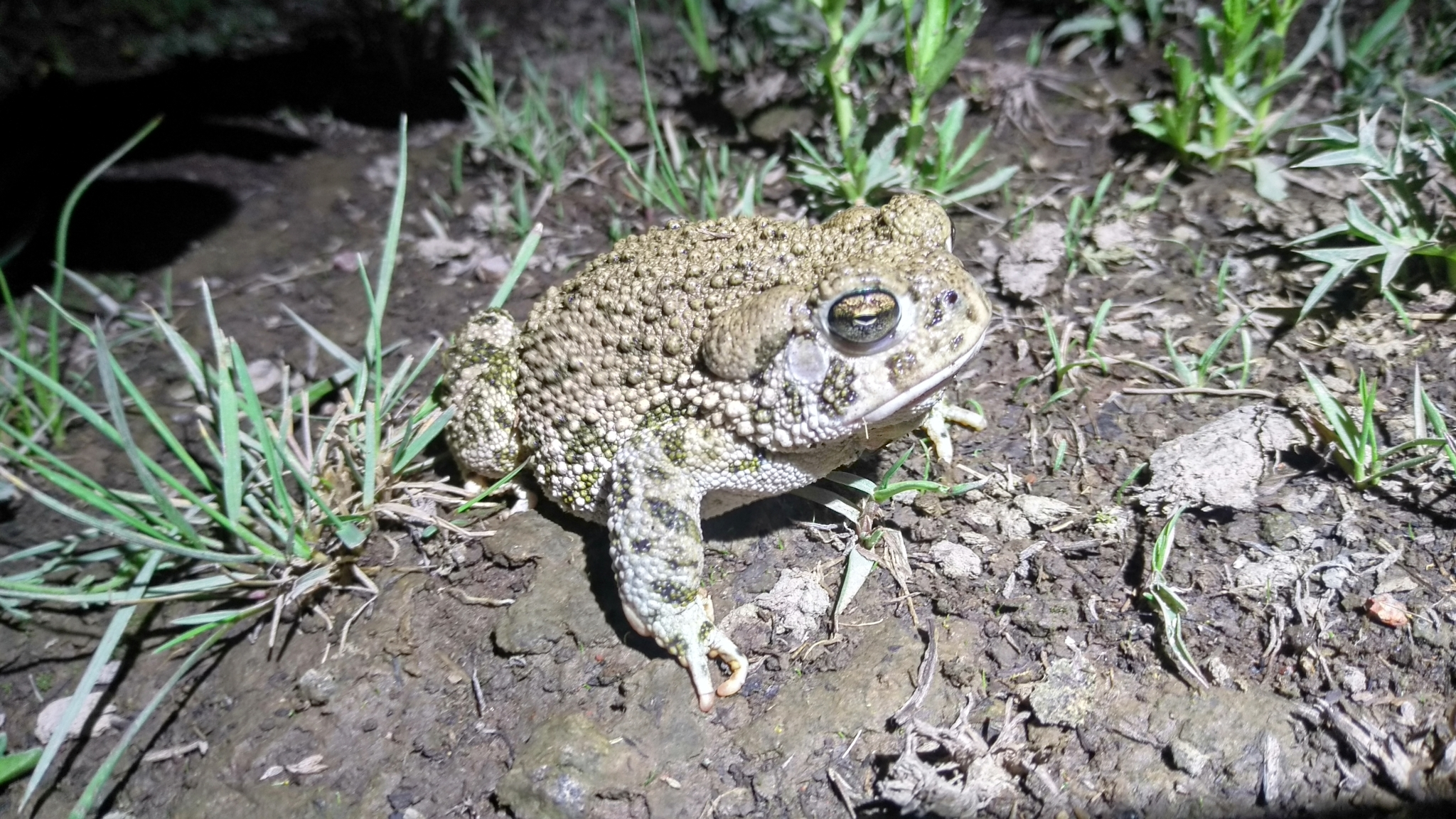

Conservation status
- Least Concern (IUCN 3.1)

Scientific classification
- Kingdom: Animalia
- Phylum: Chordata
- Class: Amphibia
- Order: Anura
- Family: Bufonidae
- Genus: Anaxyrus
- Species: A. compactilis

Binomial name
- Anaxyrus compactilis (Wiegmann, 1833)

Synonyms
- Bufo compactilis Wiegmann, 1833

= Anaxyrus compactilis =

Species of amphibian

Anaxyrus compactilis (common name: plateau toad) is a species of toad in the family Bufonidae. It is endemic to Mexico. It is a little known species associated with desert and shrubland. It is threatened by habitat loss caused by conversion of land for agriculture.
