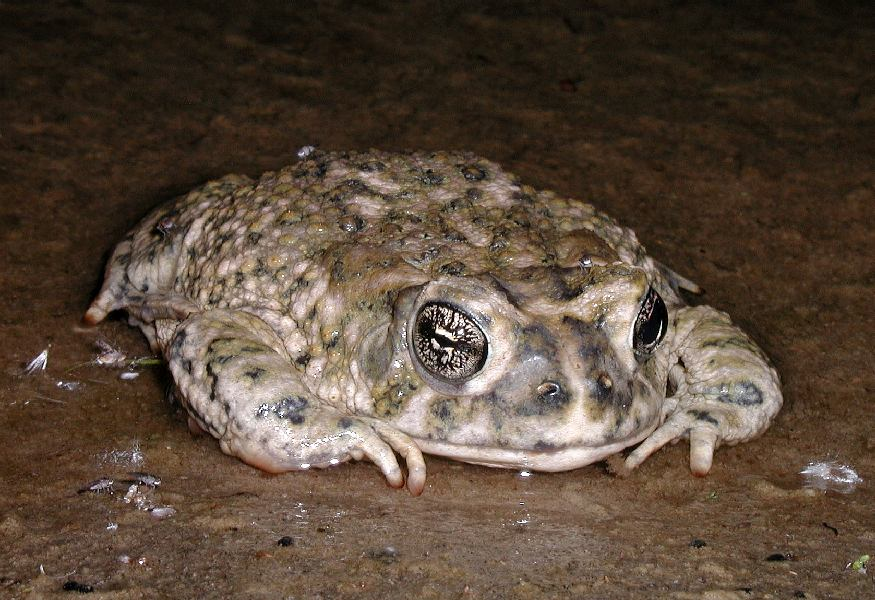

Conservation status
- Endangered (IUCN 3.1)

Scientific classification
- Kingdom: Animalia
- Phylum: Chordata
- Class: Amphibia
- Order: Anura
- Family: Bufonidae
- Genus: Anaxyrus
- Species: A. californicus

Binomial name
- Anaxyrus californicus (Camp, 1915)
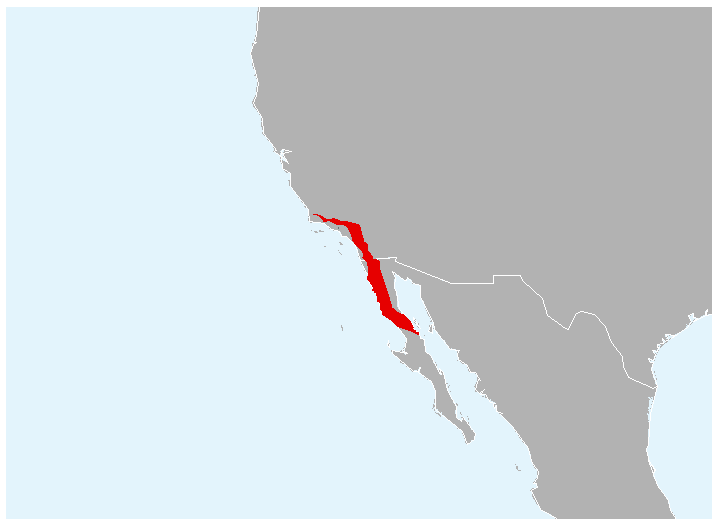

Synonyms
- Bufo cognatus californicus Camp, 1915; Bufo californicus Camp, 1915

= Arroyo toad =

Species of amphibian

The arroyo toad (Anaxyrus californicus) is a species of true toads in the family Bufonidae, endemic to California, U.S. and Baja California state, Mexico. It is currently classified as an Endangered species on the IUCN Red List of Threatened Species because of habitat destruction. The arroyo toad is at the intersection of ecological significance and conservation concern.

== Description ==
The arroyo toad is a stocky, blunt-nosed, warty-skinned species of toad, 5 to 7.5 cm (2.0 to 3.0 in) long. It has horizontal pupils, and is greenish, grey or salmon on the dorsum with a light-colored stripe across the head and eyelids. It has light sacral and mid-dorsal patches, large, oval and widely separated parotoid glands, and weak or absent cranial crests. The juvenile of this species are ashy-white, olive or salmon on the dorsal side, with or without black spotting. It has red-tipped tubercles on its back.

== Distribution and habitat ==
The arroyo toad prefers sandy or cobbly washes with swift currents and associated upland and riparian habitats, in Southern California from Santa Barbara County south into northwestern Baja California. The arroyo toad serves as an important indicator species in Southern California ecosystems. Its presence or absence can signal the overall health of its habitat. An arroyo, in the desert called a wash, is a predominantly dry creek or river bed. It fills and flows after sufficient rain, but only temporarily during specific seasons. The arroyo toad inhabits these areas alongside creeks and rivers with shallow pebble-like rocks near sandy terrains. Adults take refuge into the sandy soil for protection and shelter and for deposition of eggs. Areas with very little to no vegetation are the primary target.

== Behavior ==
The arroyo toad is nocturnal, spending most of the day underground with exception to mating season. Recent research has shown that the arroyo toad is highly sensitive to changes in water quality, making it a vital species for environmental monitoring. The arroyo toad has a unique mating call that distinguishes it from other toads in its range, contributing to its identification and study. During the mating season, the Arroyo Toad may be found during the day along the shallows of a pond. It travels by quickly hopping, as opposed to walking or striding. When hunting for food the toad lunges towards the targets, usually ants, and extends its large sticky tongue to trap and consume them.

During the dry season the arroyo toad goes into a state of hibernation called aestivation to prevent dehydration. This dormant state normally takes place within the soil or clay-like sand and is from August to January.

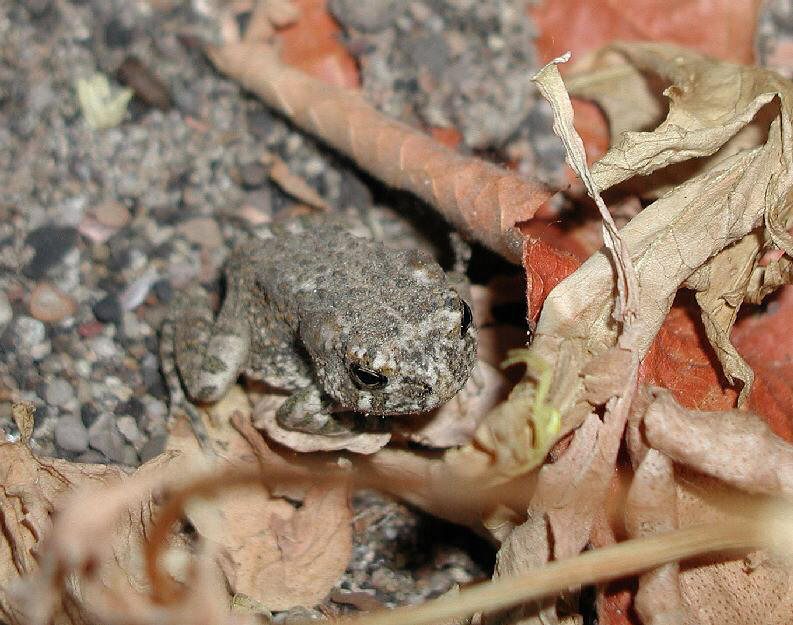
Arroyo toad

=== Reproduction ===
The breeding season of the arroyo toad revolves around the months of late winter and early spring after seasonal rains. The male toad will choose a spot near a river or water bank where he will make mating calls to attract a female toad. They mate in an amplexus position, and the female toad returns to the location to lay her eggs by the water. The eggs are laid in a two-row formation with an average of 4,700 eggs. The placement of the eggs by the water is very crucial due to the water flow: if some of the eggs are too far from hydration they will dry up and die; eggs can also drop into the depth of the water and be eaten by predators. The eggs that survive hatch in between four and six days.

=== Diet ===
Once the eggs hatch, the larvae feed on microbes found in the sand by the water where they hatch. The arroyo toad also plays a role in nutrient cycling within its habitat. Its activities help enrich the soil, which in turn supports plant growth. For the most part, young arroyo toads feed on ants and other small insects. When they grow their diet changes to include small beetles. The diet of an adult toad usually consists of caterpillars, moths, crickets, snails, and in some instances eggs and larvae of other Arroyo toads.

=== Defense mechanisms ===
The toad defends itself with a toxin found on its skin. The toxin is released from the parotid glands which can be identified as pale spots found towards the head. The main component found in the poison is called bufotoxin. All of the poison found on the toad's skin is enough to cause serious symptoms or even death in the attacker. Although some natural predators have built an immunity and regularly feed on the toads, their toxin should not be underestimated.

If a human comes in contact with the toad's skin symptoms include: serious irritation and pain to the throat, eyes, nose, and mouth, cardiovascular and respiratory systems, seizures and paralysis, vomiting, hallucinations or even death. There is no anti-venom and treatment varies based on the symptoms exhibited.

Another method of defense is hiding in vegetation or underwater from attackers.

=== Predators ===
The arroyo toad is fairly cryptic, but often vulnerable to a variety of predators. Eggs and larvae are susceptible to being preyed on by fish, other species of frogs (not excluding adult forms of the Arroyo toad), birds, snakes, and insects that inhabit the waters where the eggs and larvae are developing.

Adult arroyo toads are also vulnerable to predators such as American Bullfrogs and garter snakes. Although they may escape, they have a high likeliness of dying from wounds caused by their attackers. The American Bullfrog has a tendency to prey on males during their mating calls, and will attack toads while they are in amplex thereby preventing reproduction rates in the population. This has a great influence on the decrease in the species population number.

== Conservation ==
The total estimated breeding population is less than 3,000 individuals. In 1994 when the species was listed, only six of the 22 extant populations south of Ventura were known to contain more than a dozen adults. It has been extirpated from an estimated 75% of its former range in the U.S.

The most important threats to the arroyo toad stem from human activities. These activities include encroachment by agriculture, construction of roads, off-road vehicle use, grazing by livestock and mining. All can result in substantial habitat destruction and/or alteration of river hydrology. Other smaller threats are due to introduced non−native predators such as bullfrogs and predatory fish, non−native invasive plants, drought, wildfire and wildfire suppression, unseasonal water releases from dams, and light and noise pollution from adjacent developments.

The arroyo toad has been the subject of litigation related to its conservation status. Conservation initiatives are in place to mitigate the decline of the arroyo toad. These include habitat restoration projects and community education programs. In 2000, developer Rancher Viejo, which wished to build on a site that the toads used as a habitat, sued the Secretary of the Interior over whether the department was constitutionally authorized to apply the Endangered Species Act to prevent the development in order to protect a species that never crossed state lines. The developer's challenge to the law failed, but in his dissent to the ruling then-Judge and later-Chief Justice John Roberts famously expressed his puzzlement that "regulating the taking of a hapless toad that, for reasons of his own, lives its entire life in California constitutes regulating 'commerce...among the several states'."

On March 27, 2014, the Department of Fish and Wildlife recommended the arroyo toad's status be downgraded from Endangered to Threatened. The agency stated that the arroyo toad still faces "significant threats", in particular operation of dams and water diversions, urban development, introduced predator species, and drought. However, they felt that conditions had improved, saying, "The overall magnitude of threats impacting the arroyo toad has decreased since the time of listing, due in part to implementation of conservation and management actions."
