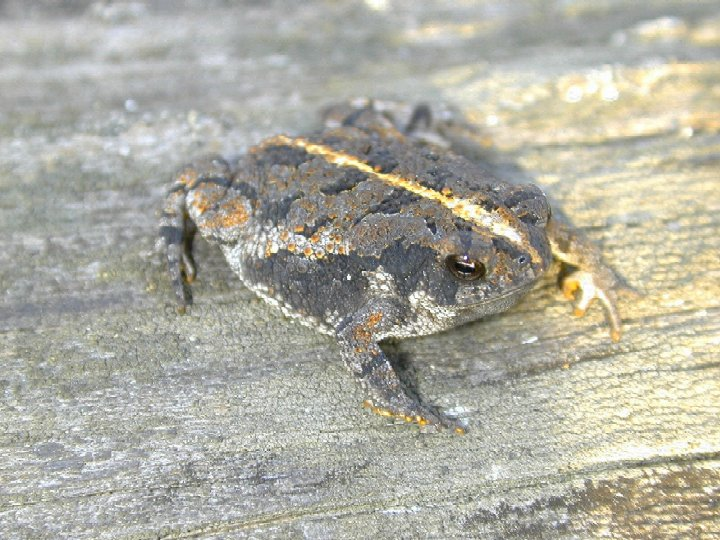

Conservation status
- Least Concern (IUCN 3.1)

Scientific classification
- Kingdom: Animalia
- Phylum: Chordata
- Class: Amphibia
- Order: Anura
- Family: Bufonidae
- Genus: Anaxyrus
- Species: A. quercicus

Binomial name
- Anaxyrus quercicus (Holbrook, 1840)
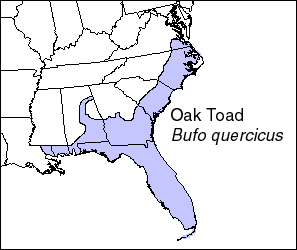
- Habitat range of A. quercicus

Synonyms
- Bufo quercicus Holbrook, 1840

= Oak toad =

Species of amphibian

The oak toad (Anaxyrus quercicus) is a species of toad in the family Bufonidae that is endemic to the coastal regions of southeastern United States. It is regarded as the smallest species of toad in North America, with a length of 19 to 33 mm (0.75 to 1.30 in).

== Description ==
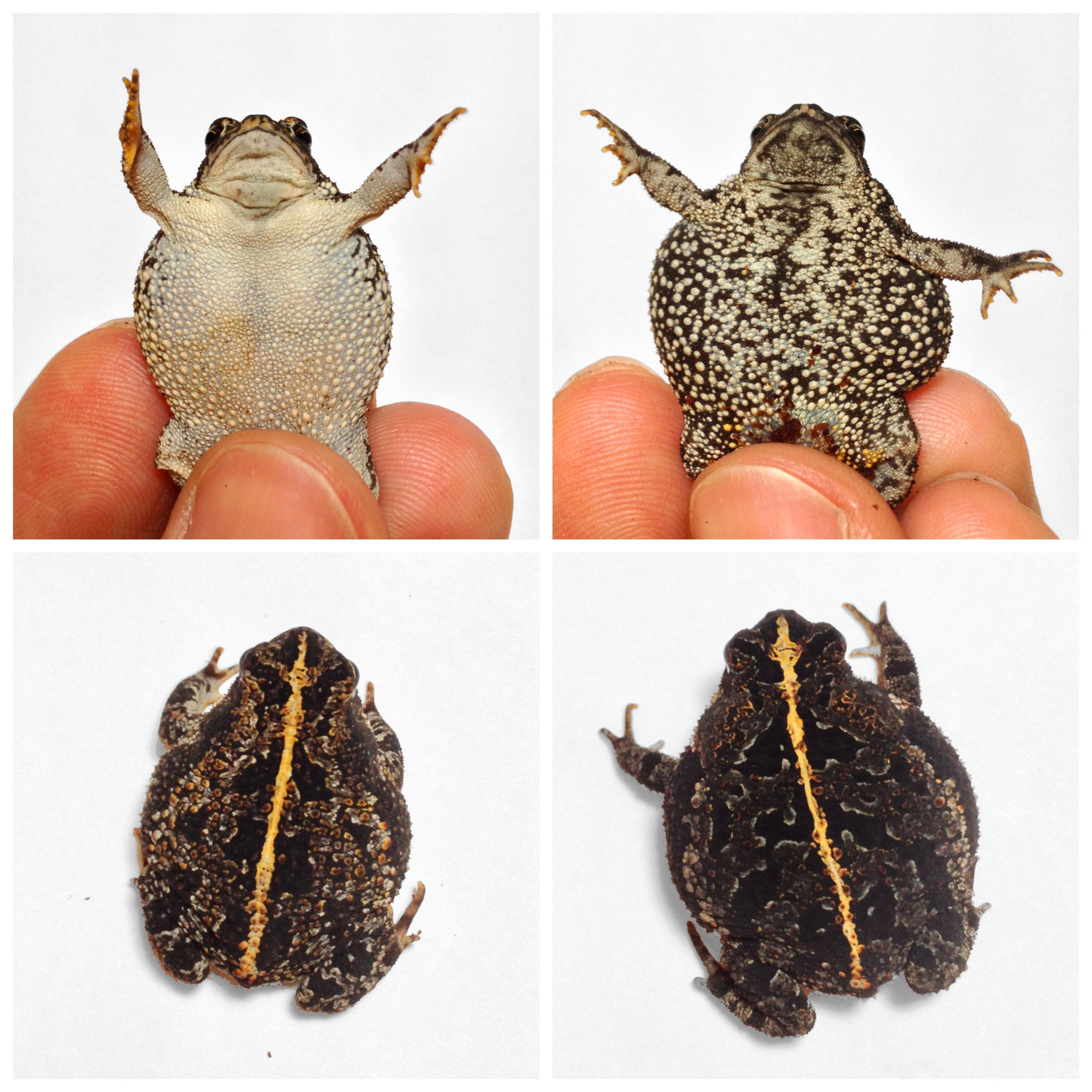
Adult male (left), female (right) - note the sharply contrasted ventral surface, the vocal sac on the male's throat, and the female's larger size

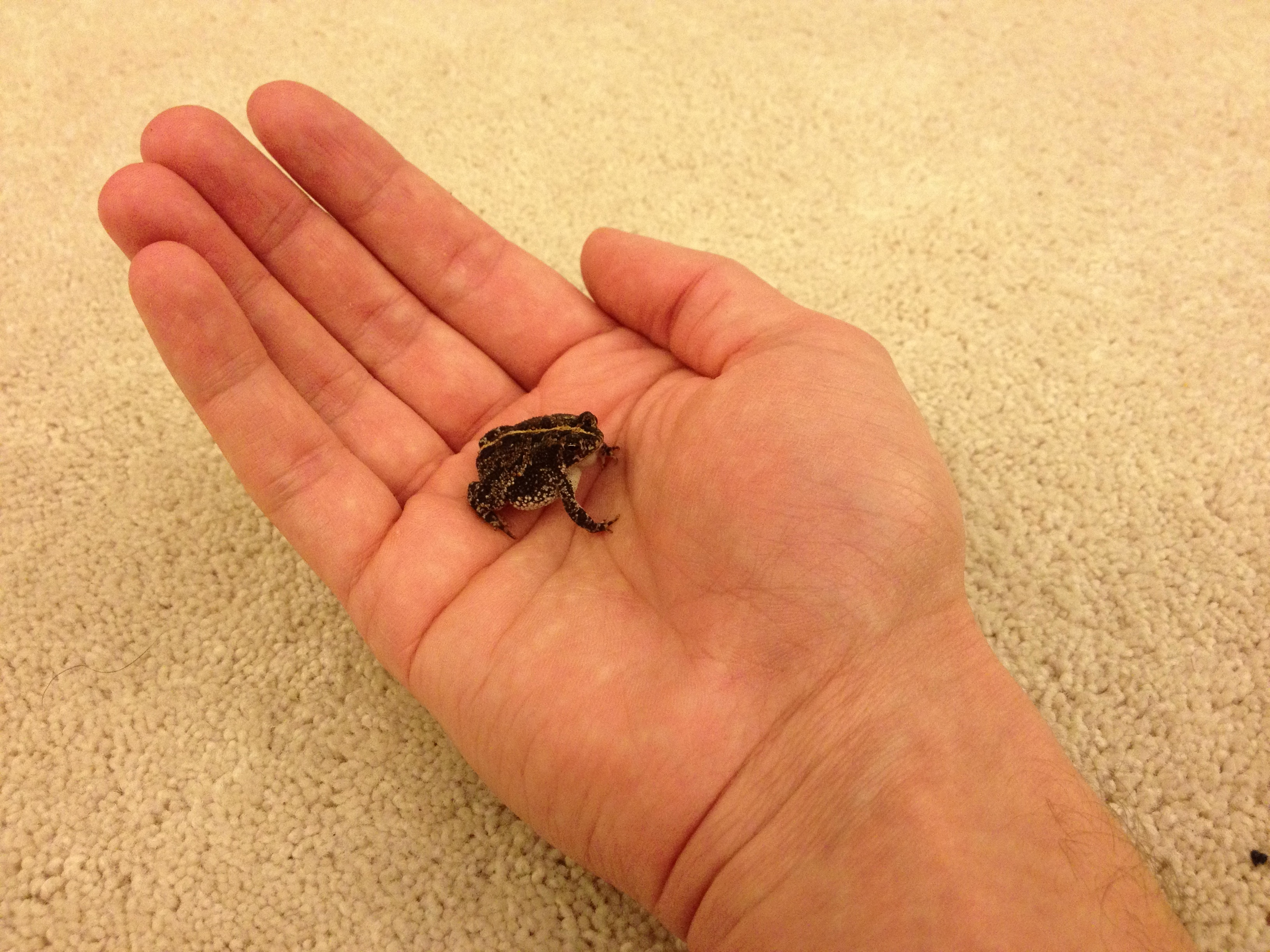
Smallest toad species in North America

The oak toad may be identified by its light mid-dorsal stripe, variable brown and black spots, and proportionally large parotoid glands. The female has a dark-spotted belly and the male has a clear white belly with a slightly distended, loose flap of skin beneath the mouth that expands into a vocal sac. As noted above, one of the most remarkable features of this species is its small adult size relative to other toads.

== Habitat and distribution ==
The oak toad is native to the coastal regions of the southeastern United States, ranging from eastern Louisiana to southeast Virginia and south throughout Florida. It is found in a variety of habitats, including sandy pine flatwoods and oak scrub, open pine and pine-oak woods, pine or oak savanna with sandy soils, and maritime forests. Oak toads prefer open-canopied pine flatwoods with grassy ground cover. They are generally found in moist, grassy areas near pine or oak savannahs with sandy soil. They also are found in vernal pools and freshwater wetlands.

== Behavior ==
Oak toads are mostly diurnal and spend much of the time burrowed into the loose soil of their habitat. They may remain in burrows during the winter, often in hibernation. The breeding season extends from April to October, peaking early on. Breeding takes place in shallow pools that accumulate during heavy rains. Heavy, warm spring rains stimulate mating behavior. The male expands his distinctive elongated vocal sac to produce a chirping call.

An average of 300 to 500 eggs are laid in short strands of three to eight eggs each, with each egg about a millimeter wide. The strands are attached to vegetation, usually submerged blades of grass 4 to 12 cm (1.6 to 4.7 in) beneath the surface. Energy investment in producing this quantity of eggs is significant, and many females are found dead during the mating season due to the rigors of the process. Fertilization takes place externally, with sperm being released in the vicinity of the eggs. As with other species of toad, the male oak toad has a Bidder's organ, which may become a functional ovary in the event of testicular malfunction.

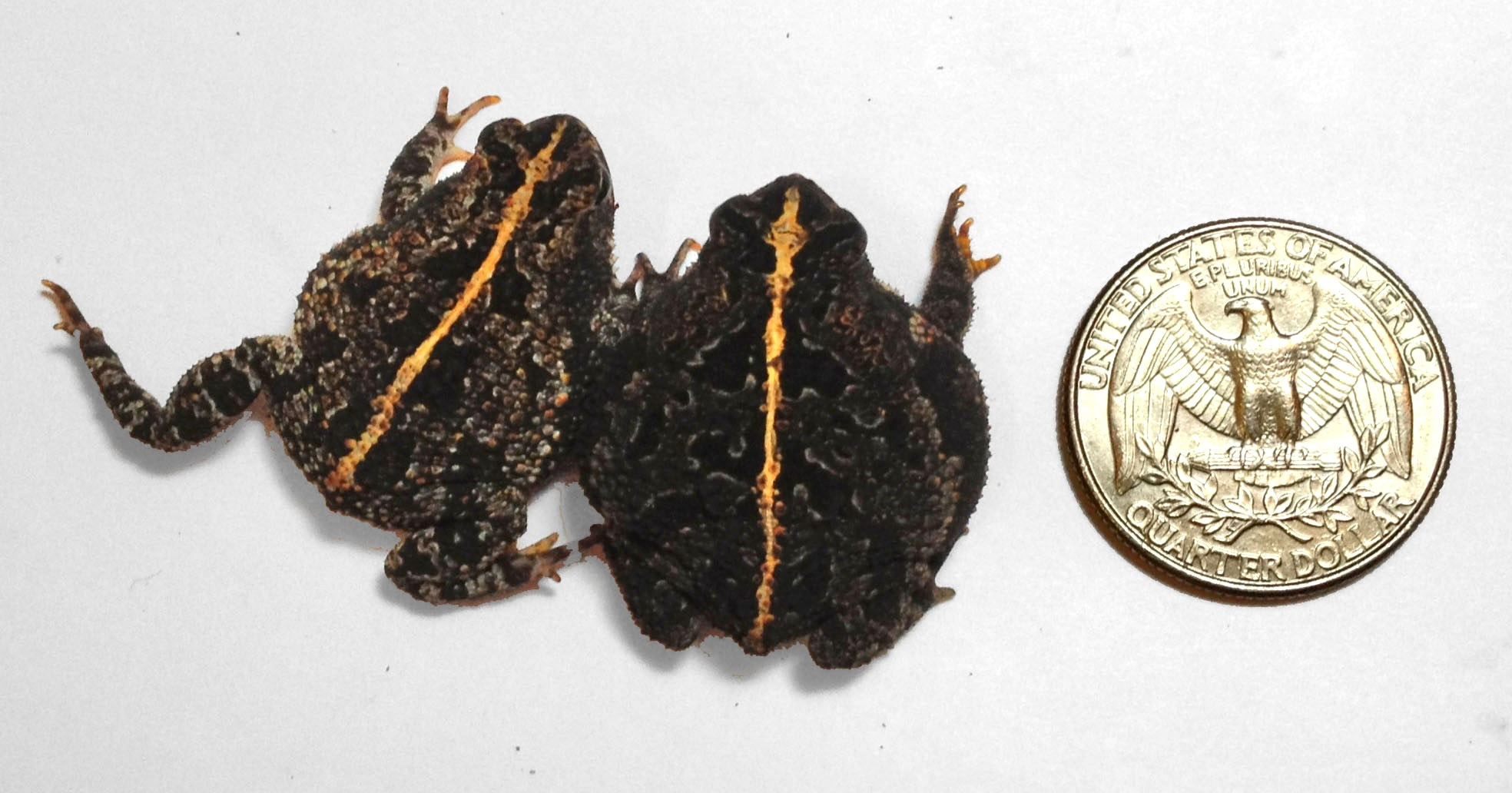
Size comparison: adult male (left), female (right), USA quarter dollar

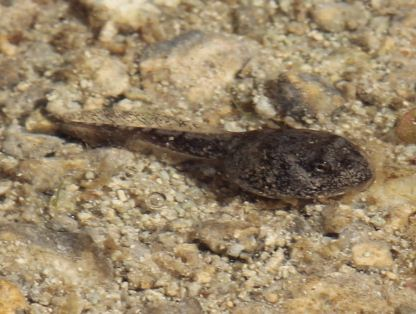
Oak toad tadpole

== Diet ==
The oak toad is a small, terrestrial frog that feeds on a variety of insects and other small invertebrates. Its diet consists primarily of ants, beetles, and spiders, as well as other insects and arthropods. The oak toad spends much of its time foraging for food, using its long, sticky tongue to capture prey. The oak toad eats mainly small insects and other arthropods. The adult has a strong preference for ants. While ants comprise a large percentage of its diet, the dietary preferences of B. quercicus are more diverse compared to those documented for numerous tropical anuran species.

== Life cycle ==
Eggs develop quickly, hatching in a mere 24 to 36 hours. The tadpole reaches a maximum length of 18 to 19.4 mm (0.71 to 0.76 in). It is grayish olive or grape-green dorsally and purplish ventrally. The tail has 6 or 7 black saddle marks.

The tadpole completes metamorphosis into a juvenile toadlet in 4 to 6 weeks and it reaches adulthood and sexual maturity at 1.5 to 2.3 years of age. The length of the lifespan is unclear. Although there are records of specimens living for four years in captivity, the reported average lifespan in captivity is 1.9 years.

== Predation ==
The primary predators of the oak toad are snakes, particularly hognosed snakes, which are specialized for eating toads. Other predators include garter snakes and gopher frogs. As with many bufonids, the oak toad inflates its body in unkenreflex when confronted by a potential predator. It secretes toxins from its parotoid glands and urinates when threatened. The male may chirp as a response to predators. Eggs also appear to have some toxic properties.

== Conservation ==
The oak toad is listed as "least concern" by the International Union for Conservation of Nature. It may become rare locally due to habitat replacement by loblolly pine plantations, urbanization, and draining of surface water in its preferred wooded habitats.
