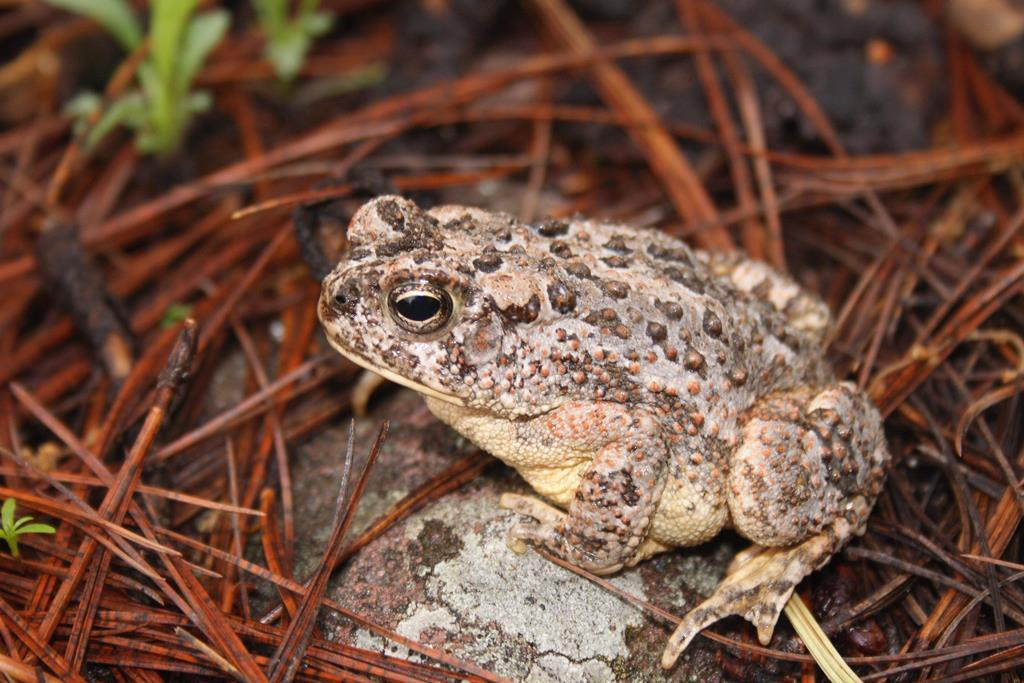

Conservation status
- Least Concern (IUCN 3.1)

Scientific classification
- Kingdom: Animalia
- Phylum: Chordata
- Class: Amphibia
- Order: Anura
- Family: Bufonidae
- Genus: Anaxyrus
- Species: A. mexicanus

Binomial name
- Anaxyrus mexicanus (Brocchi, 1879)

Synonyms
- Bufo mexicanus Brocchi, 1879

= Southwestern toad =

Species of amphibian

The southwestern toad or Mexican Madre toad (Anaxyrus mexicanus), formerly Bufo mexicanus, is a species of toad in the family Bufonidae. It is endemic to north-western Mexico and found on the Sierra Madre Occidental in eastern Sonora and western Chihuahua and south to south-western Durango. Its natural habitats are conifer forests, commonly along low rivers and streams, its breeding habitat. It is a rare species threatened by habitat disturbance, including alterations causing the desiccation of streams and soils.
