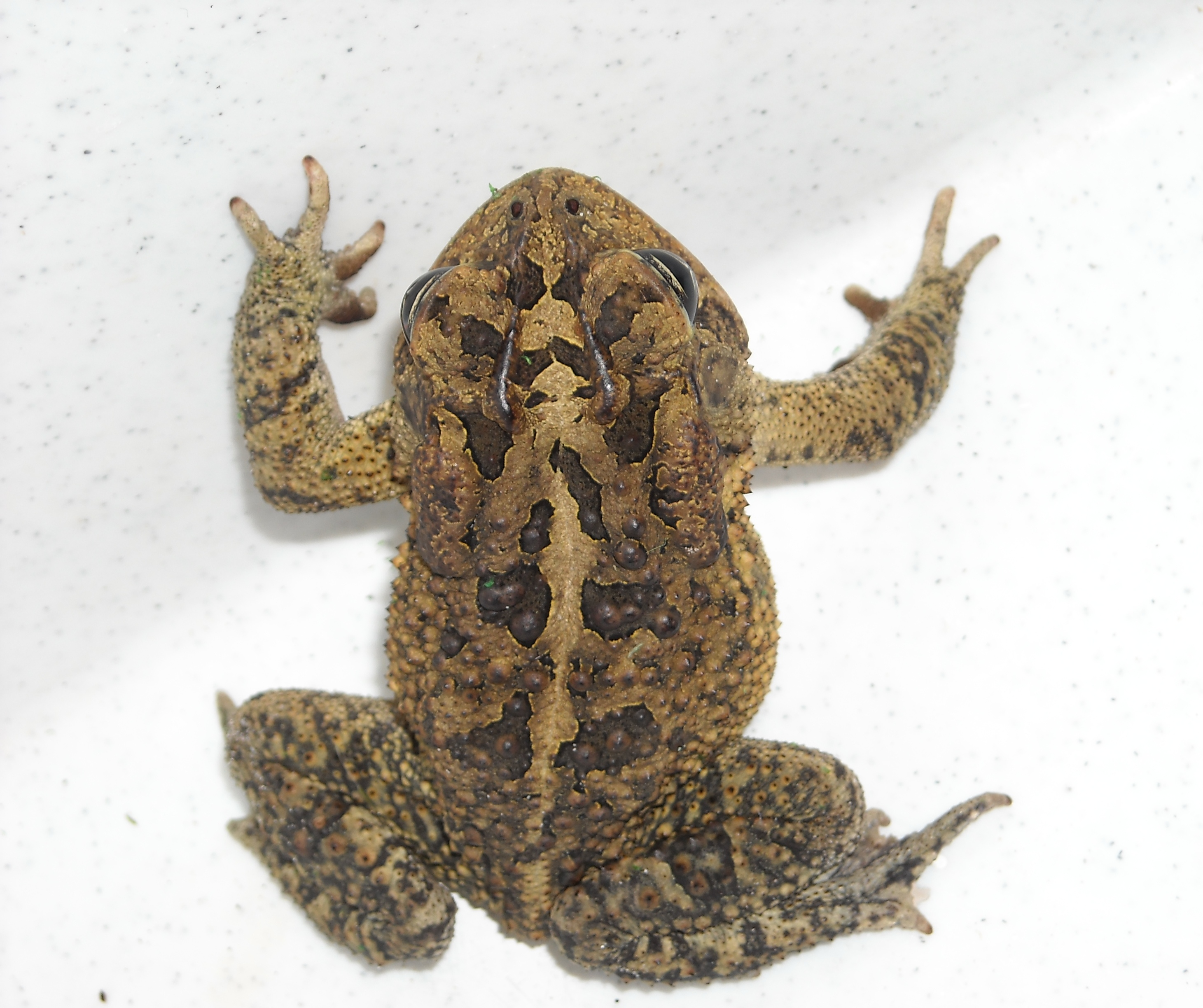

Conservation status
- Least Concern (IUCN 3.1)

Scientific classification
- Kingdom: Animalia
- Phylum: Chordata
- Class: Amphibia
- Order: Anura
- Family: Bufonidae
- Genus: Anaxyrus
- Species: A. terrestris

Binomial name
- Anaxyrus terrestris (Bonnaterre, 1789)

Synonyms
- Bufo terrestris (Bonnaterre, 1789); Rana terrestris Bonnaterre, 1789

= Southern toad =

Species of amphibian

The southern toad (Anaxyrus terrestris) is a true toad native to the southeastern United States, from eastern Louisiana and southeastern Virginia south to Florida, where it is the largest toad found in that range.It often lives in areas with sandy soils. It is nocturnal and spends the day in a burrow. Its coloring is usually brown but can be red, gray, or black. It is approximately 8 cm (3 inches) long.

== Description ==
The southern toad is a medium-sized, plump species with a snout-to-vent length of up to 92 mm (3.6 in) with females being slightly larger than males. The most obvious distinguishing features are the knobs on the head and the backward-pointing spurs that extend as far as the paratoid glands. The dorsal surface is covered with warts, some of which may be spiny. The color of the head, back and sides varies from brick red to mottled grey, brown and black while the underparts are pale, sometimes with dark spots on the chest.

== Distribution ==
The southern toad is found on the coastal plain of the southeastern United States. Its range extends from southern Virginia to Florida and Louisiana and there are two isolated populations on the Piedmont plateau and the Blue Ridge Mountains in South Carolina. Southern toads are generalists when it comes to their habitats, since they can be found in many different areas, including fragmented landscapes, suburban areas, and many more.

== Behavior ==
The southern toad is nocturnal and lives in a burrow by day, or sometimes hides under a log or pile of debris. It occurs in woodland in cultivated land and gardens and sometimes stands beneath outdoor lights at night to pick up the attracted insects that fall to the ground. A 2006 study found that there was no difference in the number of toads found in wooded and clearcut area, but there was a difference in the survival rates which was much higher in wooded area. In winter it may become inactive and remain in its burrow for extended periods.

== Reproduction ==
Breeding starts in spring when the males migrate from their upland habitats to the lowland pools, ditches, swamps and the margins of lakes where they breed. They breed in both temporary and permanent aquatic habitats in shallow waters. The breeding season typically occurs between the first of March into late May although it will occasionally continue up until September. Heavy rain triggers large numbers of males to congregate and call, forming choruses. Each female lays a clutch ranging from 1,704 to 16,537 eggs. The eggs hatch and the tadpoles take 30 to 55 days to develop before undergoing metamorphosis into juvenile toads about 1 cm (0.4 in) long. The tadpoles feed on algae which they scrape from underwater vegetation. Adults are carnivorous and feed on any small invertebrates they can find and swallow. When tadpoles grow up in environments with elevated saline levels they are smaller and less active, metamorphize later, and are smaller as adults. Tadpoles prefer open waters. Tadpoles select areas of higher temperature.

== Predators ==
Hog-nosed snakes feed heavily on adult southern toads. Southern toads will release bufotoxin from parotoid glands for defense.

== Status ==
The southern toad has a wide range and is common in much of that range, though it has become scarce in Florida in areas where the cane toad has become established due to out-competition for food. In general it is an adaptable species and faces no particular threats, the population seems stable and the IUCN has listed it as being of "least concern". Southern toads are sometimes exploited by the pet trade. In a study on ecotoxicology, southern toad larvae were found to have delayed development in areas with high metal contamination.

== Gallery ==
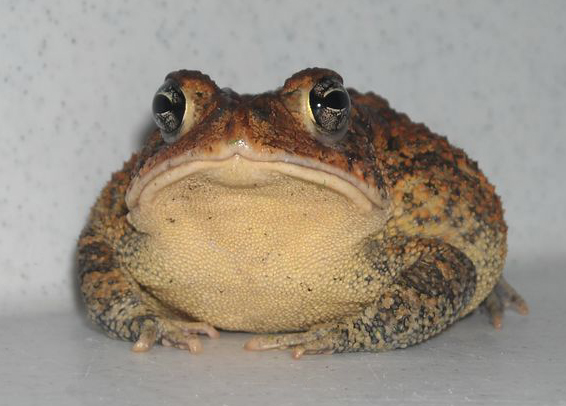
Adult

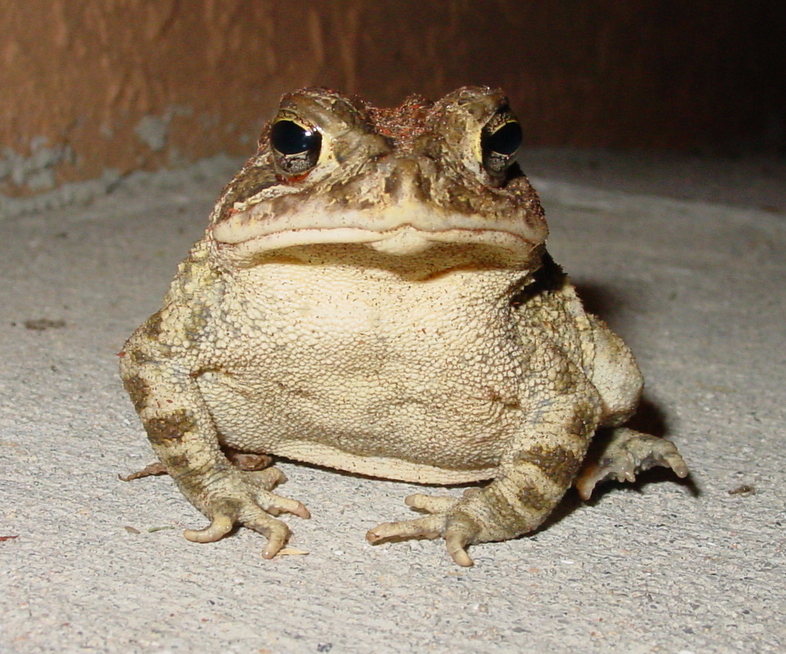
In Florida

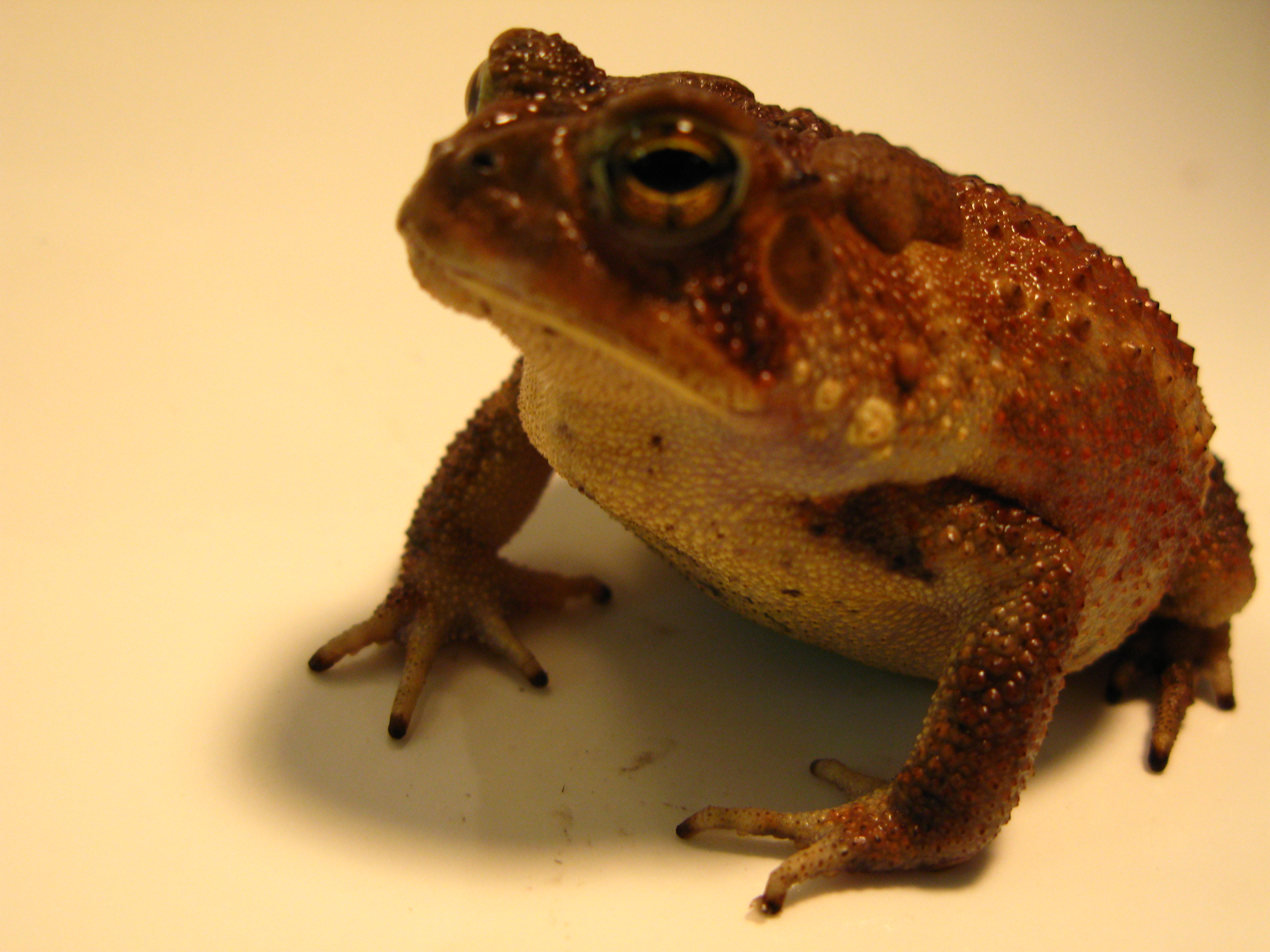
Note the large parotoid gland
