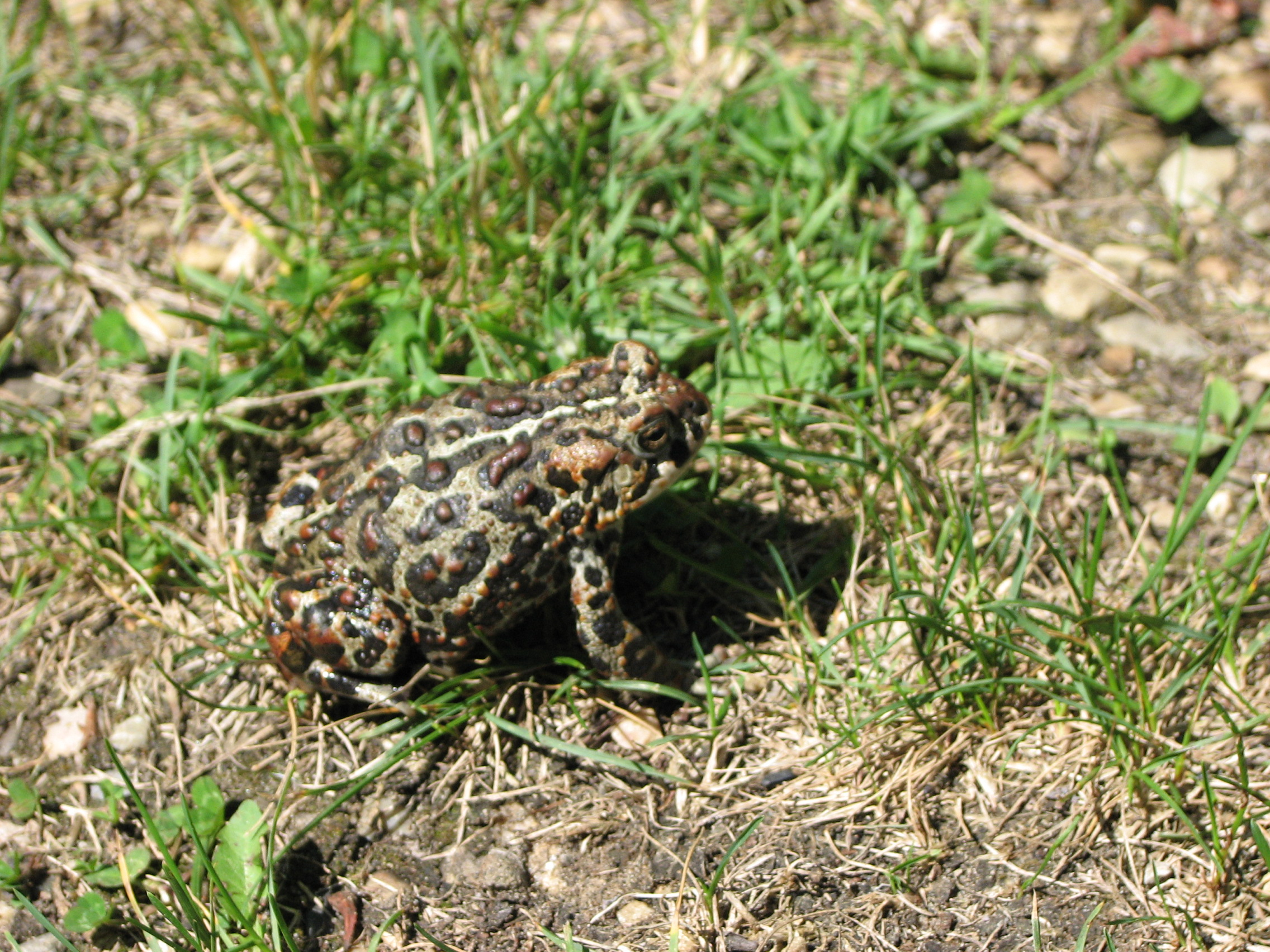
- Canadian toad at Wagner Natural Area, Alberta

Conservation status
- Least Concern (IUCN 3.1)

Scientific classification
- Kingdom: Animalia
- Phylum: Chordata
- Class: Amphibia
- Order: Anura
- Family: Bufonidae
- Genus: Anaxyrus
- Species: A. hemiophrys

Binomial name
- Anaxyrus hemiophrys (Cope, 1886)
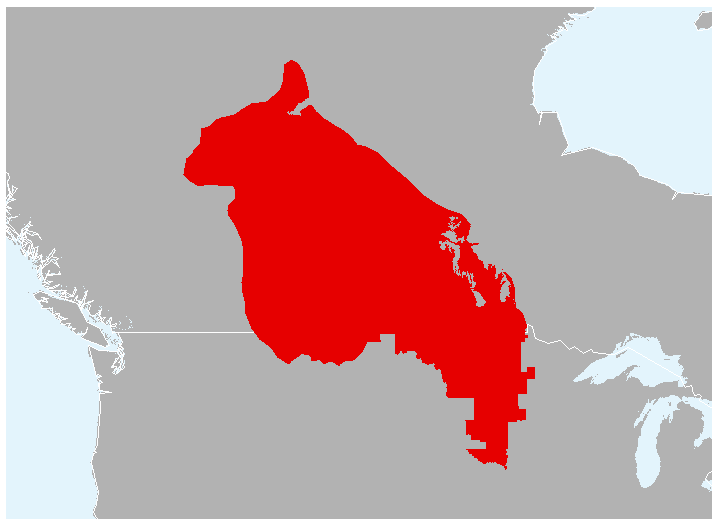
- Canadian toad range

Synonyms
- Bufo hemiophrys Cope, 1886

= Canadian toad =

Species of amphibian

The Canadian toad (Anaxyrus hemiophrys), also known commonly as the Dakota toad, is a species of toad that ranges from the prairie regions of western Canada south to parts of the upper midwest of the United States. It belongs to the family Bufonidae, the "true" toads. Its specific name is derived from the Latin word hemiophrys, meaning eyebrow, which refers to its pronounced cranial crest between and behind the eyes. Anaxyrus hemiophrys displays the typical toad characteristics: it lacks a tail and teeth, it has a horizontal pupil, and its dry skin is thick and warty.

== Description ==
The Canadian toad can grow to around 7.6 cm (3 in) in length. Fully grown adult males are usually 5.6 to 6.9 cm (2.2–2.7 in), while females are a little bigger between the ranges of 5.6 and 7.9 cm (2.2–3.1 in) and they weigh between 35 and 55 g. Their colouring is described by Cope (1886) as "brown, marked on the back with a median yellowish line, and two to three rows of brown spots of medium size on each side of it." Each spot has one to two tubercles in their centers which are redder in colour than the rest of the spots. He also identified two spots on the upper lip, one below the tympanum and a large spot that extends from below the parotid gland to near the front of the humerus. The parotid gland is narrow and secretes a toxin to protect it from predators. The toxins can cause irritation to the eyes and mouth and if it is ingested it can cause illness, but despite this toxin they are safe to handle.

The coronal crests of Anaxyrus hemiophrys are well defined. The interorbital crests are narrow, relatively sharp-edged, non-porous and are widely separated. They run relatively parallel throughout most of their length, as far posterior as the level of the coronal crests. Posterior to that level they flare laterally to join the postorbital crests, delimiting the anterolateral edge of the postcoronal plane. Postcoronal plane is clearly defined and sloped posteroventrally. It is smooth and subtriangular, its apex directed posteriorly and it ends at the foramen magnum. Its sides are delimited anteriorly by short parietal crests. Particularly useful externally is the interorbital crest shape. In Anaxyrus hemiophrys the posterior ends of the crests almost invariably diverge at least slightly where they join the postorbital crests (usually not evident externally). This provides the easiest way to distinguish Anaxyrus hemiophrys from its close relative Anaxyrus americanus, who share some of the same territory. In Anaxyrus hemiophrys the postorbital crests are absent and the interorbital crests are fused to form a boss between the eyes, whereas, in the Anaxyrus americanus the interorbital crests are well separated and join distinct postorbital crests at a right angle. The boss is a soft tissue structure characteristic of this genus. It is anchored by the previously discussed structures of the skull.

On the back of the external face of the tibia are several rows of dermal tubercles. The heel of the hind foot when the hind leg is extended comes level to the posterior edge of the orbit. The tubercles of the metatarsals are large. The internal one is very wide and prominent with an extensive acute edge and the external one is smaller with a free cutting edge that is transverse to the length of the tarsus.

== Taxonomy and systematics ==
Anaxyrus hemiophrys was first described in 1886 by Edward Drinker Cope in the Proceedings of the American Philosophical Society as Bufo hemiophrys. Cope describes the anatomical characteristics and superficial characteristics, comparing them with other related species. Cope determined that the Anaxyrus hemiophrys differs from most of the other North American "Bufo" species because of the lack of postorbital crests and in having spots on its belly.

The closely related Anaxyrus baxteri (the Wyoming toad) was once considered a subspecies of the Anaxyrus hemiophrys. It is a relict population that is believed to be a remnant from when the Anaxyrus hemiophrys, or its ancestors, range was larger.

The range of territory covered by Anaxyrus hemiophrys is fairly large although it has been shown to be declining in southern regions of Alberta. In Canada Anaxyrus hemiophrys' range extends from a small southern patch in the Northwest Territories down through eastern and central Alberta. It spreads east from there through most of Saskatchewan and into southwestern Manitoba. In the United States its range goes from northern Montana and heads east into North Dakota. Once in North Dakota it dips south into the northeastern corner of South Dakota and also enters northwestern Minnesota.

== Ecology ==
=== Diet ===
The tadpoles of Anaxyrus hemiophrys eat plant debris and other nutrients found in the waters in which they were spawned by way of suspension feeding. Juvenile Anaxyrus hemiophrys' dine mainly on small ground dwelling Coleoptera (beetles). The adult Canadian toad's diet is mainly insects, the most important being Coleoptera (beetles) and Hymenoptera (ants, bees, wasps, and sawflies). The small amount of non-insect food they consume is mainly small spiders.

=== Reproduction ===
Breeding for Anaxyrus hemiophrys typically commences during early emergence in late April to early May and goes until August or September. It takes place in aquatic environments. The male grasps the female in a process called amplexus. The female deposits the eggs in shallow water and the male fertilizes them with his sperm as they are being deposited. Eggs are laid in the shallows of lakes, ponds, and other similar bodies of water. The water contains vascular plant debris, new grass shoots, and/or sparse cattail. This setting provides some shelter for the eggs by helping to prevent water flow from washing them away and it provides nutrients for the tadpoles when they hatch.

=== Life cycle ===
Anaxyrus hemiophrys lays eggs in strings of 6000 eggs and can lay up to 20,000 eggs each year. The eggs take around four to five days to hatch. The tadpoles live in the water where they hatched for 7–11 weeks. During that time they go through metamorphosis into juvenile toads, feeding on the plant nutrients in the water by suspension feeding. Juveniles stay near the water and are usually found in large numbers near a breeding area. Adult Anaxyrus hemiophrys can be found living near lakes, streams, irrigation ditches and wetlands. Anaxyrus hemiophrys reaches maturity at around one year old in males and two years old in females. They live to be anywhere between seven and twelve years old with the oldest living in the middle of the latitudinal range sampled.

=== Torpor ===
The process of torpor (hibernation) proceeds as early as late August. The toads burrow in the earth and create little holes to sleep in. These create small mounds known as mima mounds. Each mima mound may contain hundreds of toads. They stay there for the duration of the fall and winter, burrowing deeper as the soil temperature drops. Individual toads usually pick the same spot for torpor each year. Emergence begins once the soil thaws and the toads can dig their way out.
