= Little Mexican toad =

Conservation status
- Least Concern (IUCN 3.1)

Scientific classification
- Kingdom: Animalia
- Phylum: Chordata
- Class: Amphibia
- Order: Anura
- Family: Bufonidae
- Genus: Anaxyrus
- Species: A. kelloggi

Binomial name
- Anaxyrus kelloggi (Taylor, 1936)

Synonyms
- Bufo kelloggi Taylor, 1938

Species of amphibian

The little Mexican toad (Anaxyrus kelloggi), formerly Bufo kelloggi, is a species of toad in the family Bufonidae. It is endemic to Mexico and found in the Pacific coastal plains between central Sonora and Nayarit. The specific name honors Remington Kellogg, who was an American zoologist and a director of the United States National Museum.

The species' natural habitats are thorn forests and tropical deciduous forests on coastal open lowlands to 200 m (660 ft) above sea level. It is tolerant to human disturbance and can breed in artificial water bodies such as dams.
