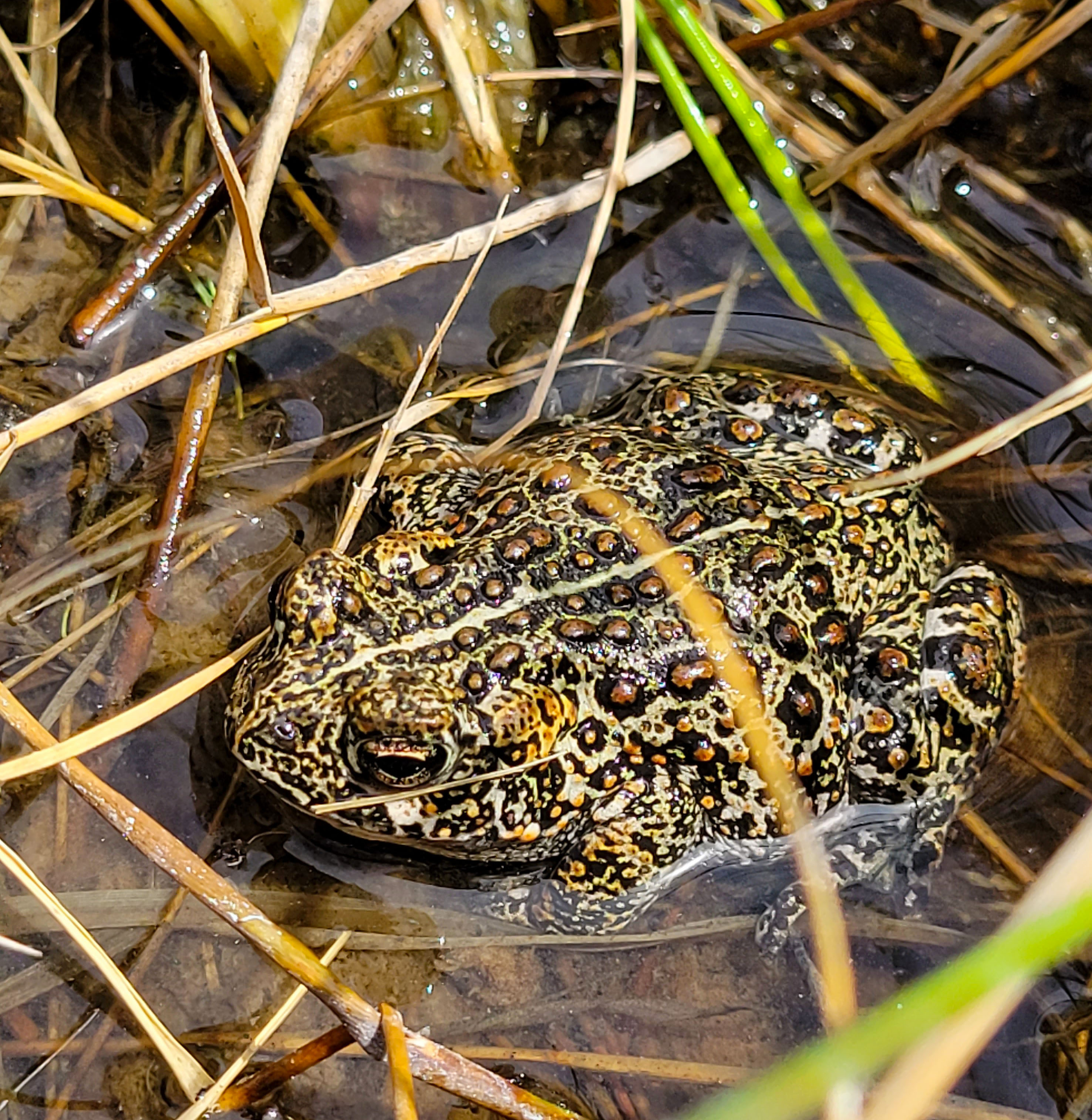

Conservation status
- Critically Endangered (IUCN 3.1)

- Endangered (ESA)

Scientific classification
- Kingdom: Animalia
- Phylum: Chordata
- Class: Amphibia
- Order: Anura
- Family: Bufonidae
- Genus: Anaxyrus
- Species: A. williamsi

Binomial name
- Anaxyrus williamsi (Gordon, Simandle, & Tracy, 2017)
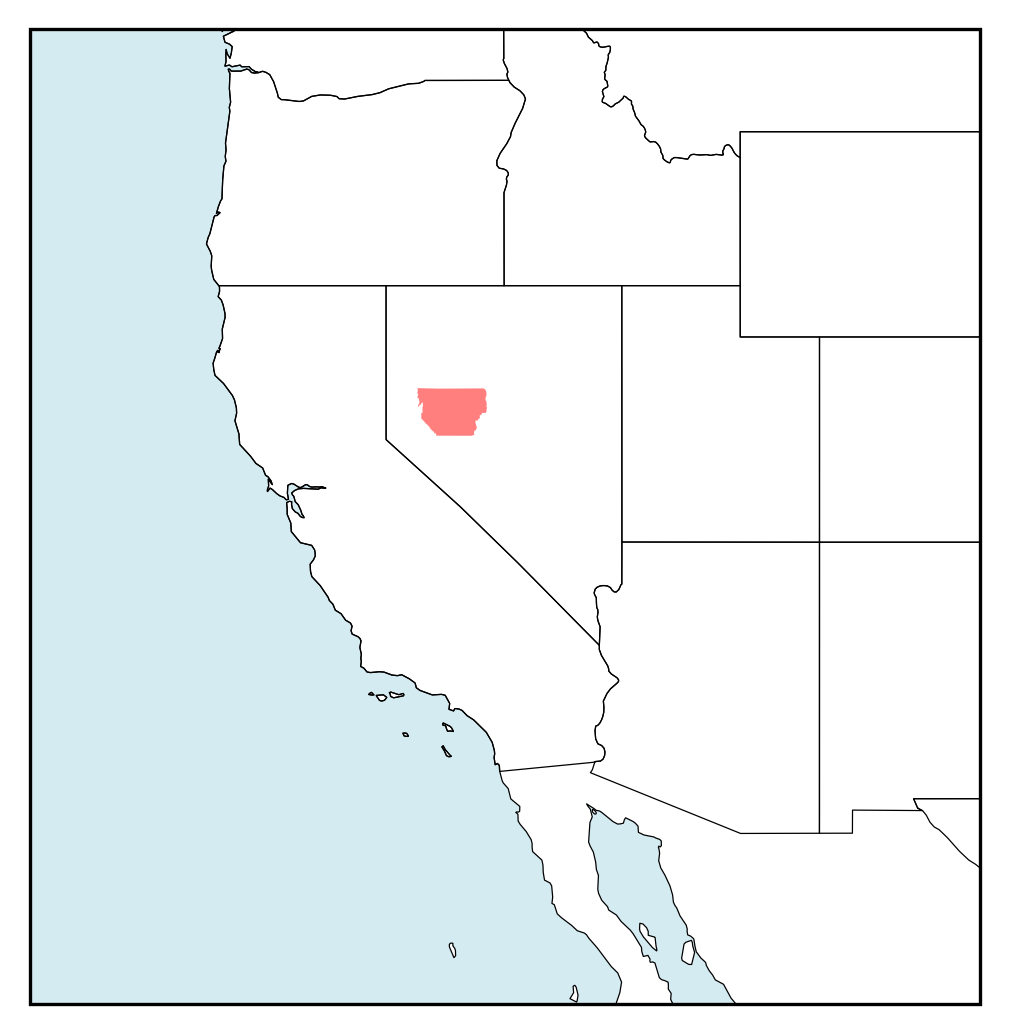
- Anaxyrus williamsi range

Synonyms
- Bufo williamsi Gordon, Simandle & Tracy, 2017

= Dixie Valley toad =

Species of amphibian

The Dixie Valley toad (Anaxyrus williamsi) is a species of toad in the family Bufonidae. It is endemic to Churchill County in the state of Nevada in the United States. It was the first new toad species to be described from the United States since the description of the now-extinct in the wild Wyoming toad (A. baxteri) about 49 years prior.

== Taxonomy ==
It was formerly considered an isolated population of the common western toad (A. boreas) until physical and genetic analyses found it to be a separate species, and described it as such in 2017. It is descended from an ancestor that inhabited the large lakes and wetlands that covered the Great Basin in the Pleistocene until the receding water isolated the different populations, leading to speciation.

== Distribution and habitat ==
The Dixie Valley toad is found only in a small complex of vegetated spring-fed marshlands in Dixie Valley, one of the hottest and most geothermally active systems in the region. The surrounding areas are largely arid land with few aquatic resources, isolating A. williamsi from the rest of the world.

== Description ==
It can be physically distinguished from the western toad by the scattered gold-colored flecks that cover its olive body, and is also the smallest member of the A. boreas species complex in the region.

== Threats ==
While it is considered locally abundant within its extremely small range, environmentalist groups believe that it may be threatened by plans to build a binary cycle geothermal power plant, alleging that operations may degrade the marshland that it lives in by drying up the springs.

As part of an environmental review performed by the Bureau of Land Management (BLM) prior to permitting approval, required by the National Environmental Policy Act (NEPA), an Aquatic Resources Monitoring and Mitigation Plan (ARMMP) was required to be developed before the project could begin construction. The purpose of the monitoring and mitigation plan is to ensure that significant adverse effects on aquatic resources (water resources, riparian and wetland vegetation, and aquatic special status species) do not occur. The ARMMP was developed in close coordination between the developer and the BLM prior to the BLM's finding of no significant impact in 2021.

In April 2022, the Fish and Wildlife Service designated the Dixie Valley toad an endangered species on a temporary, emergency basis. The developer, Ormat Technologies, agreed in August to temporarily cease construction and later asked that the judge allow it to scale back its plans by 80%. A permanent decision to list the species as endangered was published and took effect on December 2, 2022.
