= Liolaemus dicktracyi =

Conservation status
- Vulnerable (IUCN 3.1)

Scientific classification
- Kingdom: Animalia
- Phylum: Chordata
- Class: Reptilia
- Order: Squamata
- Suborder: Iguania
- Family: Liolaemidae
- Genus: Liolaemus
- Species: L. dicktracyi

Binomial name
- Liolaemus dicktracyi Espinoza & Lobo, 2003

Species of lizard

Liolaemus dicktracyi is a species of lizard in the family Liolaemidae. It is native to Argentina.
