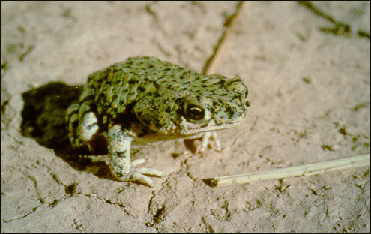
- Western green toad, Anaxyrus debilis insidior

Conservation status
- Least Concern (IUCN 3.1)

- Secure (NatureServe)

Scientific classification
- Kingdom: Animalia
- Phylum: Chordata
- Class: Amphibia
- Order: Anura
- Family: Bufonidae
- Genus: Anaxyrus
- Species: A. debilis

Binomial name
- Anaxyrus debilis (Girard, 1854)
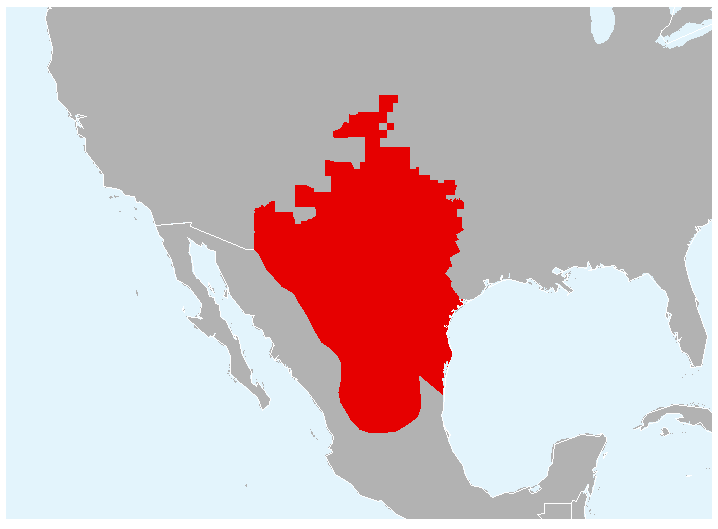

Synonyms
- Bufo debilis Girard, 1854; Bufo insidior Girard, 1854

= Anaxyrus debilis =

Green toad

Species of amphibian

The North American green toad (Anaxyrus debilis) is a species of toad found in the southwestern United States in the states of Arizona, New Mexico, Colorado, Kansas, Oklahoma and Texas. It is also found in northern Mexico in the states of Tamaulipas, San Luis Potosí, Durango, and Zacatecas. It is commonly called green toad (with many variants).

== Description ==
Green toads are typically bright to pale green in color, with black spotting. They are not large toads; adult males are about 37–46 mm (1.5–1.8 in) in snout–vent length and females 44–54 mm (1.7–2.1 in).

== Habitat and reproduction ==
Green toads are relatively widespread and at least locally common. They are elusive, typically found during or after rainfall in semi-arid and dry habitats. Breeding occurs from late March to August, stimulated by summer rains. Males move from drier, terrestrial habitat to aquatic breeding sites where they form choruses. Females are attracted by chorusing males. Breeding aggregations do not usually last long, only a few days.

== Predation ==
Tadpoles and adults are eaten by black-necked garter snakes. Adults are eaten by gopher snakes, checkered garter snakes, plains garter snakes, and western hog-nosed snakes. These toads are also eaten by American bullfrogs.

== Subspecies ==
Two subspecies, originally described as separate species, can be identified, but this distinction is disputed:

- Eastern green toad, Anaxyrus debilis debilis
- Western green toad, Anaxyrus debilis insidior

== See also ==
- European green toad (Bufo viridis), a species that is only distantly related, but shares the same common name.
