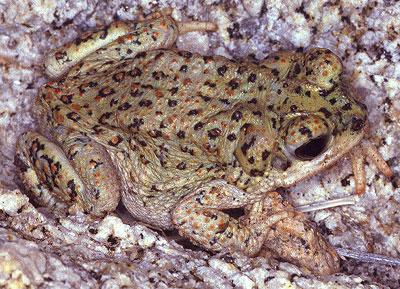

Conservation status
- Least Concern (IUCN 3.1)

Scientific classification
- Kingdom: Animalia
- Phylum: Chordata
- Class: Amphibia
- Order: Anura
- Family: Bufonidae
- Genus: Anaxyrus
- Species: A. punctatus

Binomial name
- Anaxyrus punctatus (Baird and Girard, 1852)

Synonyms
- Bufo punctatus Baird and Girard, 1852

= Red-spotted toad =

Species of amphibian

The red-spotted toad (Anaxyrus punctatus), formerly Bufo punctatus, is a toad in the family Bufonidae found in the southwestern United States and northwestern Mexico.

== Description ==
It is a small toad species growing to 3.7 to 7.5 cm (1.5 to 3.0 in) in length. It has a flattened head and body, and a light grey, olive or reddish brown dorsum with reddish or orange skin glands. It has a whitish or buff venter with or without faint dark spotting, and round parotoid glands. The snout is pointed. The juvenile toad looks similar to the adult, but has more prominent ventral spotting and the undersides of its feet are yellow. The male red-spotted toad has a dusky throat and develops nuptial pads during the breeding season.

It may hybridize with the western toad (Anaxyrus boreas) in some locations, possibly with other toad species too. It is docile and easily handled with little or no skin gland secretions.

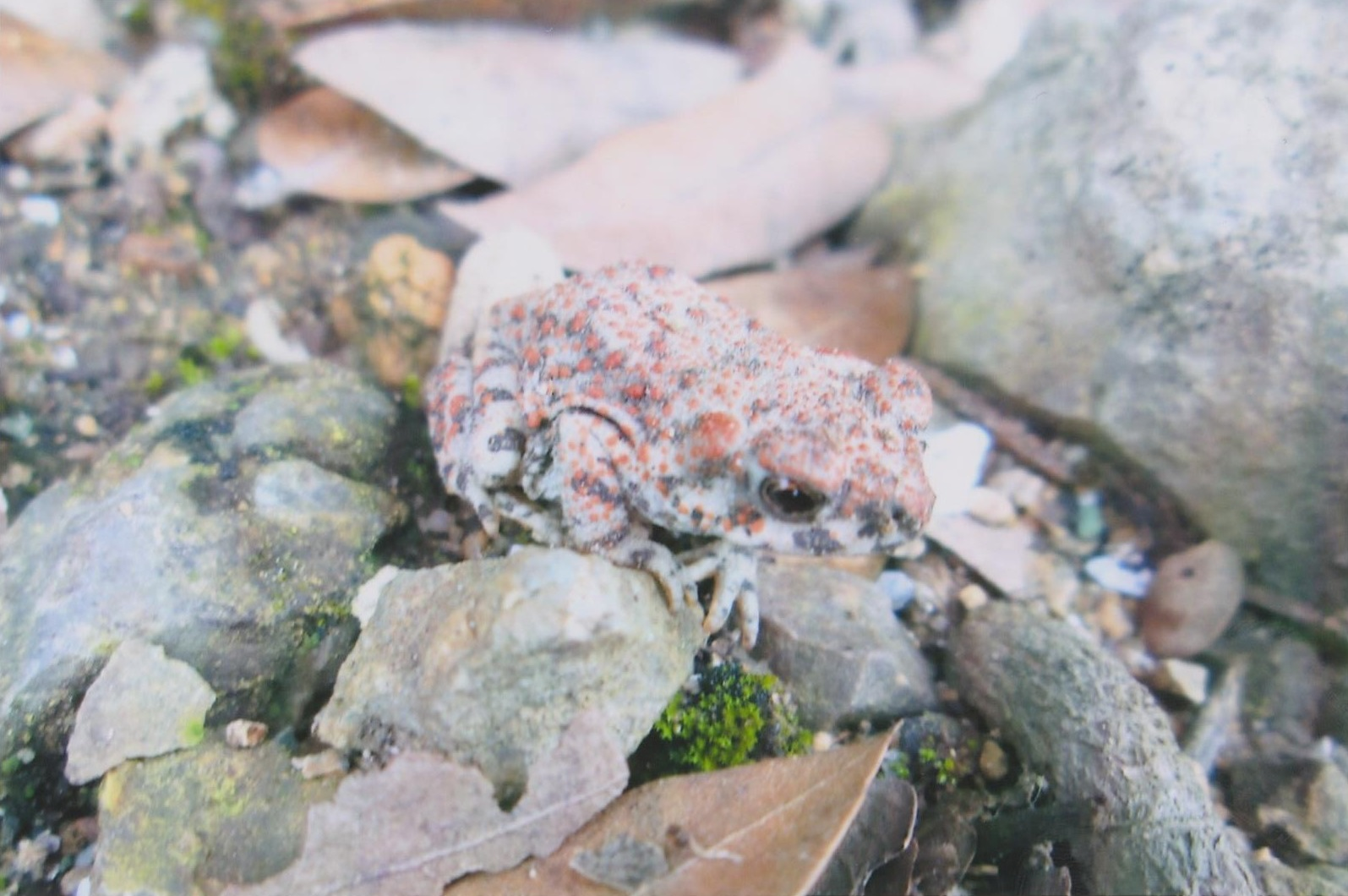
A red-spotted toad in the Patagonia Mountains of southeastern Arizona.

== Distribution and habitat ==
This toad is native to the southwestern United States and northwestern Mexico, especially Baja California. It occurs primarily along rocky streams and riverbeds, often in arid or semi-arid regions. It is very localized on the coastal slope, but widespread in the deserts. In dry areas it needs seasonal pools or even temporary rain puddles to use for breeding. Eggs hatch in three days and the tadpole can transform in 6–8 weeks, taking advantage of the ephemeral water bodies. It spends dry periods in burrows or beneath rocks or moist plant matter, and becomes suddenly active during rainfall when multitudes of individuals emerge.
