= C. Richard Tracy =

American biologist and academic (born 1943)

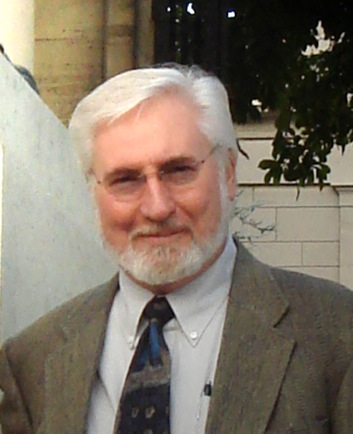
- C. Richard Tracy
- Born: Clarence Richard Tracy; May 24, 1943 (age 83); Glendale, California, United States
- Education: California State University, Northridge (B.A.), (M.S.) University of Wisconsin-Madison (Ph.D.)
- Scientific career
- Fields: Conservation Biology, Biological Ecology, Ecology, Endangered Species Recovery Planning, Great Basin Ecology, Habitat Conservation Planning, Herpetology, Physiological Ecology, Population Biology

C. Richard (Dick) Tracy (born 1943) is an American biologist, a professor of biology at the University of Nevada, Reno.

Tracy earned bachelor's and master's degrees in biology at California State University, Northridge in 1966 and 1968, and then moved to the University of Wisconsin–Madison, where he earned a Ph.D. in zoology in 1972. After postdoctoral studies in Madison, he held a faculty position at Colorado State University from 1974 to 1995, when he moved to the University of Nevada, Reno. In 1980, Tracy visited the University of Washington in Seattle as a Guggenheim Fellow.

Tracy's research includes physiological ecology and biophysical ecology, as well as population biology and conservation biology, largely of reptiles and amphibians. His modeling research on the biophysical ecology of amphibians is considered foundational to our understanding of the ways in which amphibians interact with their physical environments. He has also conducted research on reptilian herbivores including Galapagos Land Iguana, Chuckwallas, and the federally listed desert tortoise. He has served on the desert tortoise recovery team, and chaired the assessment committee for the U.S. government's desert tortoise recovery plan.

== Education ==
He received a B.A. in 1966 in biology from the California State University, Northridge. He received an M.S. in 1968 in biology from California State University, Northridge. He received a Ph.D. in 1972 in zoology from the University of Wisconsin-Madison

From 1974 to 1995 Tracy was a member of the faculty at Colorado State University. He has taught at the University of Wisconsin, the University of Washington, the University of Puerto Rico, and Pepperdine University. Tracy has also taught at the biological stations administered by the University of Nebraska–Lincoln, Colorado State University, and the University of Michigan. He has served as major professor for 45 graduate students and 13 postdocs. Twenty-four of his Ph.D. students and postdocs have become professors at colleges and universities all over the world, and seven are scientists in the U.S. Geological Service. He maintains a diverse research program including pure and applied projects in physiology, ecology, and conservation biology that has resulted in more than 170 publications. Several projects incorporate principles, data, and analyses into strategies for preserving sensitive biological resources and for conservation planning.

The lizard species Liolaemus dicktracyi is named after him.

== Honors ==
- Fellow, John Simon Guggenheim Foundation
- Fellow, American Association for the Advancement of Science
- Distinguished Scholar, Pepperdine University
- University Fellow, University of Wisconsin
- Fellow, Ecological Society of America (2025)

== Professional society memberships ==
- American Association for the Advancement of Science [Fellow]
- American Society of Ichthyologists and Herpetologists
- American Society of Naturalists
- Desert Tortoise Council
- Ecological Society of America
- Herpetologists’ League
- International Iguana Society
- Order of Sigma Xi
- Society of Conservation Biologists
- Society for Integrative and Comparative Biology
- Society for the Study of Amphibians and Reptiles
