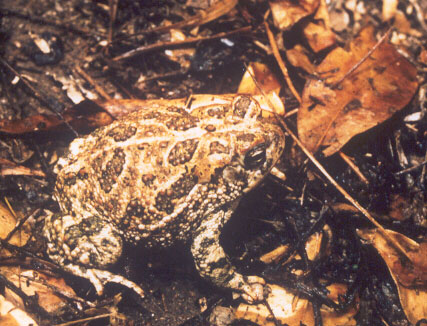

Conservation status
- Least Concern (IUCN 3.1)

Scientific classification
- Kingdom: Animalia
- Phylum: Chordata
- Class: Amphibia
- Order: Anura
- Family: Bufonidae
- Genus: Anaxyrus
- Species: A. cognatus

Binomial name
- Anaxyrus cognatus (Say, 1822)

Synonyms
- Bufo cognatus Say, 1822

= Great Plains toad =

Species of amphibian

The Great Plains toad (Anaxyrus cognatus) is a relatively large species of true toad native to central North America.

== Distribution ==
The amphibian is native throughout the Canadian Prairies (northern Great Plains) in southern Alberta, Manitoba, and Saskatchewan; and into northern Mexico in the Sonoran Desert and Mexican Plateau.

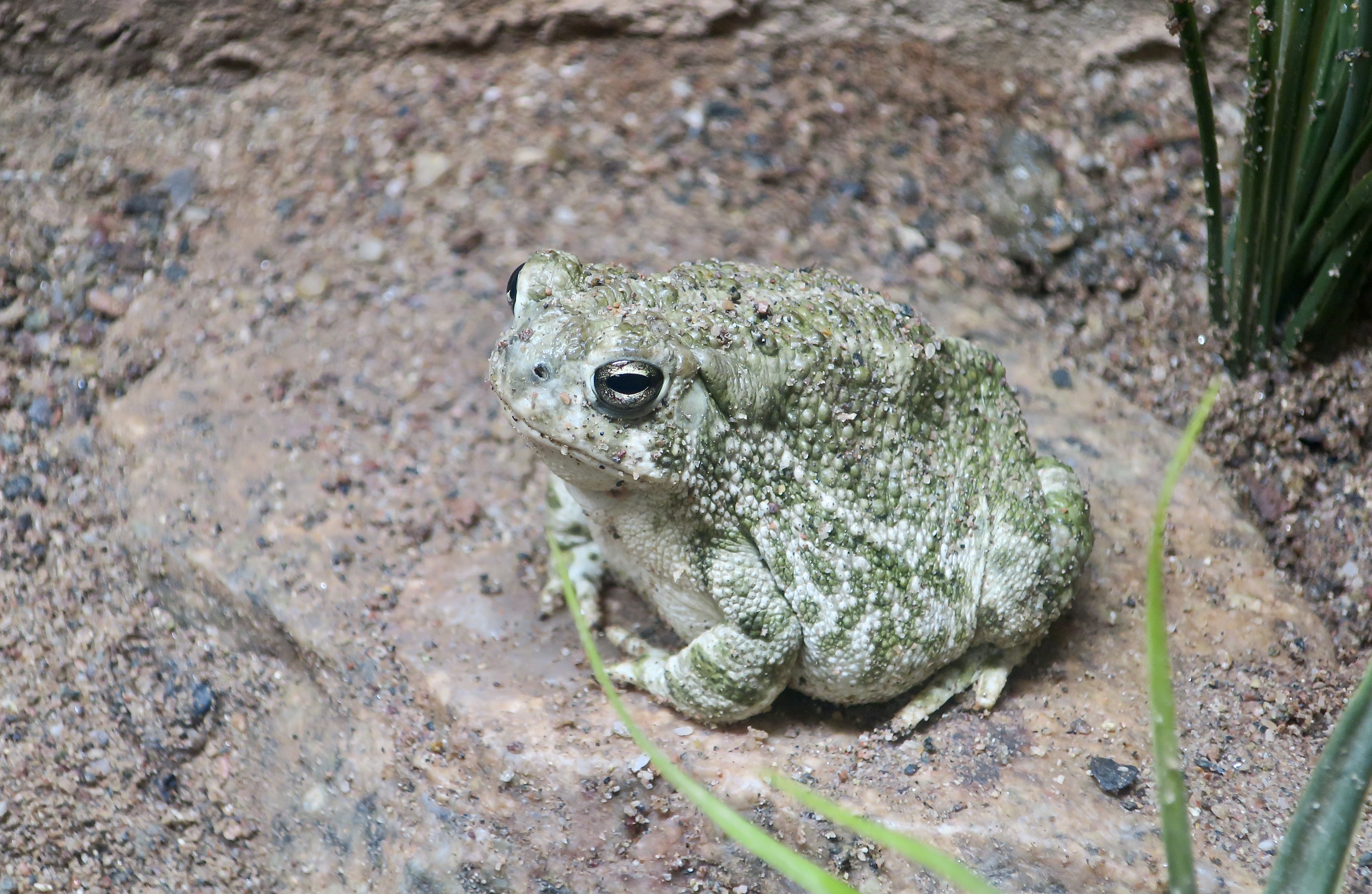
A Great Plains toad at Phoenix Zoo.

== Description ==
The Great Plains toad is grey, brown, and green in color, with darker colored blotching. It can grow to anywhere between 5.1 and 11.4 cm (2 and 4.5 in) in length. Its primary diet is various species of cutworms. It prefers grassland habitat with loose soil that is easy to burrow in. Breeding occurs throughout the spring and summer months, most often immediately after heavy rainfall. In dry areas it may only emerge from its burrow for a few weeks when conditions are right, and usually at night, but in areas with permanent water bodies and abundant rain it may be active all day. Its mating call is a very loud, harsh chirping noise repeated many times, very fast.

== Ecology ==
The great plains toad feeds a range of insects such as lepidopterans, dipterans, hymenopterans, coleopterans, ants, and termites. The toad is preyed upon by the plains garter snake (Thamnophis radix), among others. It uses chemoreceptors to sense chemical cues left by the snake.

The great plains toad occur in deserts, grasslands, semi-desert shrublands, open floodplains, and agricultural areas. When inactive they burrow underground. Breeding takes place in temporary water bodies such as rain pools, flooded areas, and ponds; they can also use margins of reservoirs. The eggs and larvae develop in shallow water and metamorphose after 17 to 45 days.

== Conservations ==
The Great Plains toad has wide distribution and is not considered threatened, although it may suffer from road kills, farming, and suburban sprawl, increased droughts, and urbanization.
