= Oz the Great and Powerful (soundtrack) =

Oz the Great and Powerful (Original Motion Picture Soundtrack)

Film score by Danny Elfman
- Released: March 5, 2013
- Recorded: 2012–2013
- Studio: Sony Scoring Stage
- Genre: Film score
- Length: 1:05:19
- Label: Walt Disney
- Producer: Danny Elfman

Danny Elfman chronology
| Promised Land (2012) | Oz the Great and Powerful (2013) | Epic (2013) |

Oz the Great and Powerful (Original Motion Picture Soundtrack) is the soundtrack album to the 2013 film of the same name, produced by Walt Disney Pictures. The film is directed by Sam Raimi, and featured musical score composed by Danny Elfman. The score was recorded at Sony Scoring Stage and the album featured 27 tracks with a promotional single titled "Almost Home" performed by American singer-songwriter Mariah Carey. The soundtrack was released by Walt Disney Records on March 5, 2013, followed by a physical CD release in association with Intrada Records on March 26.

== Development ==
In June 2011, composer Danny Elfman was chosen to score for Oz the Great and Powerful, in his fifth collaboration with Raimi on Darkman (1990), A Simple Plan (1998), Spider-Man (2002) and Spider-Man 2 (2004). It also marked Elfman's re-union with Raimi, as due to their creative dispute on scoring Spider-Man 2 Elfman decided not to collaborate with Raimi on his forthcoming projects, this meant that Elfman did not compose for the third instalment Spider-Man 3. He noted that the film's score was accessibly quick to produce, with a majority of the music being written in six weeks. Regarding the tonal quality of the score, Elfman stated, "We're going to take an approach that's old school but not self-consciously old-fashioned. Let the melodrama be melodrama, let everything be what it is. I also think there's the advantage that I'm able to write narratively, and when I'm able to write narratively I can also move quicker because that's my natural instincts, I can tell a story in the music." Elfman did not adapt any of the musical influences from The Wizard of Oz (1939), despite having pop-culture references "visually and musically". Raimi insisted Elfman, that the team were working on L. Frank Baum's early 20th century Oz novels and not from the film. He decided to create a "fresh music for the setting", but also wanted to pay homage to the 1939 film.

American singer-songwriter Mariah Carey recorded a promotional single called "Almost Home" written by Carey, Simone Porter, Justin Gray, Lindsey Ray, Tor Erik Hermansen, and Mikkel Eriksen (a.k.a. Stargate) for the soundtrack of the film. The song was recorded at February 6, 2013 at New York City at Roc The Mic Studios. In a statement, Carey said that the song has "a message that works beautifully with the film. It's a feel-good record; it gives you the feeling of reaching your home and being with people that you love." The single was released on February 19, 2013, by Island Records, despite being leaked a day before.

== Track listing ==
All music is composed by Danny Elfman.

| No. | Title | Length |
|---|---|---|
| 1. | "Main Titles" | 2:57 |
| 2. | "A Serious Talk" | 2:23 |
| 3. | "Oz Revealed" | 1:58 |
| 4. | "A Strange World" | 1:48 |
| 5. | "Where Am I? / Schmooze-a-Witch" | 2:05 |
| 6. | "Fireside Dance" | 1:19 |
| 7. | "Meeting Finley" | 1:57 |
| 8. | "The Emerald Palace" | 0:47 |
| 9. | "Treasure Room / Monkey Business" | 2:56 |
| 10. | "China Town" | 3:07 |
| 11. | "A Con Job" | 1:47 |
| 12. | "Glinda Revealed" | 1:43 |
| 13. | "The Munchkin Welcome Song" | 0:41 |
| 14. | "Bad Witch" | 4:32 |
| 15. | "The Bubble Voyage" | 2:48 |
| 16. | "Great Expectations / The Apple" | 4:58 |
| 17. | "Meeting the Troops" | 1:18 |
| 18. | "What Army" | 0:29 |
| 19. | "Theodora's Entrance / Puppet Waltz" | 1:51 |
| 20. | "A Threat" | 2:07 |
| 21. | "Bedtime / The Preparation Montage" | 7:00 |
| 22. | "Call to Arms" | 2:13 |
| 23. | "Destruction" | 2:38 |
| 24. | "Oz the Great and Powerful" | 1:25 |
| 25. | "Fireworks / Witch Fight" | 1:39 |
| 26. | "Time for Gifts" | 5:54 |
| 27. | "End Credits from Oz" | 1:59 |
| Total length: | | 1:06:19 |

== Reception ==
Gregory Heaney of AllMusic wrote "the score of Oz the Great and Powerful feels like an avenue of escape for dreamers looking for something to break up the monotony of their humdrum days, and while it might lack the catchy musical numbers of its predecessor, it's nevertheless a solid outing from Elfman." Filmtracks.com wrote "Oz the Great and Powerful is one of those great ambient listening experiences in the genre that doesn't stand up to focused analysis upon a closer look. For many listeners, such details won't matter, but that is what distinguishes a solid, workmanlike score from one destined to be a classic." A review from Beyond the Marquee stated "Of particularly high merit are the delicate emotional chords of Oscar’s character arc from con man to wizard hero. Luckily the emotional range missing from Franco’s performance is conveyed in the nuance of Elfman’s leitmotif. This would be even better had Franco’s acting skills matched the melodies in quality but, to quote comedian Steven Wright, 'you can’t have everything… where would you put it?'" ClassicFM wrote "Danny Elfman's soundtrack gets off to a fantastically glitzy start, with orchestral and choral bombast to spare - perfect vintage Hollywood fare. Another corking soundtrack from one of the modern masters of the genre."

== Personnel ==
Credits adapted from CD liner notes

Musicians

- Basses – Bruce Morgenthaler, Chris Kollgaard, Drew Dembowski, Ed Meares, Ian Walker, Mike Valerio, Oscar Hidalgo, Steve Dress
- Bass Trombone – Phil Teele
- Bassoons – John Steinmetz, Rose Corrigan
- Cellos – Andrew Shulman, Tony Cooke, Armen Ksajikian, Cecilia Tsan, Chris Ermacoff, Dennis Karmazyn, Giovanna Clayton, Paul Cohen, Steve Erdody, Tim Landauer, Tim Loo, Trevor Handy
- Clarinets – Gary Bovyer, Ralph Williams, Stuart Clark
- Flutes – Heather Clark, Louise Ditullio
- French Horns – Dan Kelley, Dave Everson, Dylan Hart, Jennie Kim, Kristy Morrell, Laura Brenes, Mark Adams, Nathan Campbell, Phil Yao, Steve Becknell
- Guitar – George Doering
- Oboes – Leslie Reed, Phil Ayling
- Percussion – Dan Greco, Don Williams, Wade Culbreath, Bob Zimmitti, Mike Fisher
- Piano – TJ Lindgren
- Soloist – Mike Fisher
- Timpani – Peter Limonick
- Trombones – Alan Kaplan, Alex Iles, Andy Martin, Bill Reichenbach, Charlie Loper, Steve Holtman, Bill Booth
- Trumpets – Barry Perkins, Dan Fornero, Jon Lewis, Marissa Benedict
- Tuba – Doug Tornquist, Jim Self
- Violas – Alma Fernandez, Brian Dembow, Carolyn Riley, Darrin McCann, David Walther, Keith Greene, Luke Maurer, Matt Funes, Robert Brophy, Shawn Mann, Thomas Diener, Vickie Miskolczy
- Violins – Alyssa Park, Ana Landauer, Carol Pool, Darius Campo, Eun-Mee Ahn, Grace Oh, Jackie Brand, Jennie Levin, Joel Derouin, Josefina Vergara, Julie Gigante, Julie Rogers, Katia Popov, Lily Ho Chen, Marc Sazer, Natalie Leggett, Neel Hammond, Nina Evtuhov, Phil Levy, Richard Altenbach, Roberto Cani, Sarah Thornblade, Shalini Vijayan, Sid Page, Tereza Stanislav, Roger Wilkie
- Concertmaster – Bruce Dukov

Orchestra and choir

- Orchestra – The Hollywood Studio Symphony
- Orchestrated by – Dave Slonaker, Edgardo Simone
- Orchestra supervisor – Steve Bartek
- Orchestra conductor – Pete Anthony
- Orchestra contractor – Gina Zimmitti
- Digital Orchestral Timings – Richard Grant
- Choir conductor – Marc Mann
- Choir contractor – Bobbi Page

Production

- Music composer and producer – Danny Elfman
- Additional music production – Monica Zierhut
- Musical assistance – Melisa McGregor, Melissa Karaban
- Technician– Greg Maloney
- Music supervisor – Marc Mann
- Music editor – Shie Rozow
- Assistant music editor – Denise Okimoto
- Supervising music editor – Bill Abbott
- Temp assistant music editor – Katia Lewin
- Temp music editor – Ellen Segal
- Additional arrangements – TJ Lindgren
- Recorded by – Dennis Sands
- Recorded at – Sony Scoring Stage, Studio Della Morte
- Additional recording – Noah Snyder
- Recordist – Adam Michalak, Adam Olmstead, Noah Snyder
- Mixed by – Alan Meyerson, Dennis Sands
- Mixed at – Todd-AO, Remote Control Productions
- Assistant mixing – Christian Wenger, Greg Hayes
- Copyist (music preparation) – Reprise Music Services, Rob Skinnell
- Executive producer (music) – Sam Raimi
- Artwork design – Steve Gerdes
- Management (executive in-charge) – Mitchell Leib
- Management (music business affairs/legal advisor) – Scott Holtzman, Sylvia Krask

== Awards ==
| Award | Date of ceremony | Category | Recipient and nominees | Result |
|---|---|---|---|---|
| BMI Film & TV Awards | April 13, 2014 | Film Music | Danny Elfman | Won |
| Georgia Film Critics Association | January 8, 2014 | Best Original Song | "Almost Home" – Mariah Carey | Nominated |
| Saturn Awards | June 2014 | Best Music | Danny Elfman | Nominated |
| World Soundtrack Awards | October 27, 2014 | Film Composer of the Year | Danny Elfman | Nominated |
