= Silver Linings Playbook (soundtrack) =

2012 soundtrack albums

Two soundtracks were released for the 2012 romantic comedy-drama film Silver Linings Playbook directed by David O. Russell—an original motion picture soundtrack and an original score album. Both the albums were released on November 16, 2012 through Sony Music Entertainment. The first album features a collection of songs heard in the film, while the second features a film score composed by Danny Elfman.

== Silver Linings Playbook: Original Motion Picture Soundtrack ==
Silver Linings Playbook: Original Motion Picture Soundtrack

Soundtrack album by Various Artists
- Released: November 16, 2012 (Digital download)
- Genre: Soundtrack
- Length: 45:36
- Label: Sony / EAN

Singles from Silver Linings Playbook: Original Motion Picture Soundtrack
- 1. "Silver Lining (Crazy 'Bout You)" Released: November 16, 2012

Silver Linings Playbook: Original Motion Picture Soundtrack is the soundtrack to the film, released in the United States by Sony Music Entertainment on November 16, 2012 for digital download. The soundtrack includes music from Stevie Wonder, the Dave Brubeck Quartet, Alt-J, Eagles of Death Metal, Jessie J and two tracks from the score composed by Danny Elfman.

Not featured on the soundtrack are Led Zeppelin's "What Is and What Should Never Be"; The White Stripes' "Hello Operator"; Stevie Wonder's "Don't You Worry 'bout a Thing" and The White Stripes' "Fell in Love with a Girl", played as the opening numbers of Pat and Tiffany's dance scene; "Misty" performed by Johnny Mathis, played after Pat and Tiffany learn they received an average of 5.0 for their dance number; "Wild Is the Wind" performed by Nina Simone, played at the start of the film's end credits.

=== Track listing ===
| No. | Title | Performers | Length |
|---|---|---|---|
| 1. | "Silver Lining Titles" | Danny Elfman | 3:12 |
| 2. | "My Cherie Amour" | Stevie Wonder | 2:52 |
| 3. | "Always Alright" | Alabama Shakes | 4:04 |
| 4. | "Unsquare Dance" | The Dave Brubeck Quartet | 2:01 |
| 5. | "Buffalo" | Alt-J featuring Mountain Man | 3:15 |
| 6. | "The Moon of Manakoora" | Les Paul and Mary Ford | 2:46 |
| 7. | "Monster Mash" | CrabCorps | 3:36 |
| 8. | "Goodnight Moon" | Ambrosia Parsley & The Elegant Too | 4:02 |
| 9. | "Now I'm a Fool" | Eagles of Death Metal | 3:42 |
| 10. | "Walking Home" | Danny Elfman | 1:04 |
| 11. | "Girl from the North Country" | Bob Dylan with Johnny Cash | 3:40 |
| 12. | "Silver Lining (Crazy 'Bout You)" | Jessie J | 3:24 |
| 13. | "Hey Big Brother" | Rare Earth | 4:45 |
| 14. | "Maria" (Bernstein Plays Brubeck Plays Bernstein) | The Dave Brubeck Quartet | 3:20 |
| Total length: | | | 45:36 |

=== Reception ===
Heather Phares of AllMusic wrote "While the soundtrack's song choices will obviously resonate more with fans of the film, Silver Linings Playbook's music is so engaging it could easily win over those who haven't seen it."

=== Charts ===
| Chart (2012) | Peak position |
|---|---|
| UK Soundtrack Albums (OCC) | 18 |

The lead single from the soundtrack, "Silver Lining (Crazy 'Bout You)" peaked at #100 in the UK Singles.

=== Accolades ===
| Award | Date of ceremony | Category | Recipient(s) | Result | Ref(s) |
|---|---|---|---|---|---|
| Grammy Awards | January 26, 2014 | Best Song Written for Visual Media | Jessie J and Diane Warren (for "Silver Lining (Crazy 'Bout You)") | Nominated | |

== Silver Linings Playbook: Original Motion Picture Score ==
Silver Linings Playbook: Original Motion Picture Score

Film score by Danny Elfman
- Released: November 16, 2012
- Genre: Film score
- Length: 20:27
- Label: Sony Music
- Producer: Danny Elfman

Danny Elfman chronology
| Frankenweenie (2012) | Silver Linings Playbook (2012) | Hitchcock (2012) |

Danny Elfman's score for the film was released on digital download by Sony Music Entertainment simultaneously with the song album.

| No. | Title | Length |
|---|---|---|
| 1. | "Silver Lining Titles" | 3:11 |
| 2. | "Running Off" | 2:01 |
| 3. | "Simple" | 1:55 |
| 4. | "With A Beat" | 2:17 |
| 5. | "Tiny Guitars" | 1:01 |
| 6. | "Walking Home" | 1:04 |
| 7. | "Silver Lining Wild-Track" | 2:57 |
| 8. | "The Book" | 0:41 |
| 9. | "Happy Ending" | 3:52 |
| 10. | "Goof Track" | 1:28 |
| Total length: | | 20:27 |

=== Reception ===
Filmtracks.com wrote "The style of the vocals and wayward opening track may deter some Elfman collectors as well, despite the easy-going and pleasant personality of the rest of the short work." James Southall of Movie Wave wrote "It's all pleasant, it's all completely inoffensive, but also so inconsequential."

=== Accolades ===
| Award | Date of ceremony | Category | Recipient(s) | Result | Ref(s) |
|---|---|---|---|---|---|
| World Soundtrack Awards | October 19, 2013 | Soundtrack Composer of the Year | Danny Elfman (also for Epic, Frankenweenie, Hitchcock, Oz the Great and Powerful, Promised Land) | Nominated | |
| International Film Music Critics Association | February 21, 2013 | Film Composer of the Year | Danny Elfman (also for Dark Shadows, Frankenweenie, Men in Black 3, Hitchcock and Promised Land) | Won | |
| International Film Music Critics Association | February 21, 2013 | Best Original Score for a Comedy Film | Danny Elfman | Nominated | |
