= Hitchcock (soundtrack) =

Hitchcock (Original Motion Picture Soundtrack)

Film score by Danny Elfman
- Released: December 4, 2012
- Recorded: 2012
- Studios: AIR, London
- Genre: Film score
- Length: 38:38
- Label: Sony Masterworks
- Producer: Danny Elfman

Danny Elfman chronology
Silver Linings Playbook (2012)	Hitchcock (2012)	Promised Land (2012)

Hitchcock (Original Motion Picture Soundtrack) is the soundtrack accompanying the 2012 film Hitchcock directed by Sacha Gervasi. The film's original score is composed by Danny Elfman and released through Sony Masterworks on December 4, 2012. The score featured inspirations from the works of Bernard Herrmann, whom Elfman had been inspired by.

== Development ==
In September 2012, it was reported that Danny Elfman would compose music for Hitchcock. Elfman agreed to score the film after he watched Gervasi's documentary Anvil! The Story of Anvil (2008) and found it to be engaging. Both Gervasi and Elfman researched on Hitchcock's history, this also includes reading the original source material—Stephen Rebello's novel Alfred Hitchcock and the Making of Psycho, which the film is based on—and eventually commissioned music from Hitchcock's films. Elfman re-recorded the original Psycho score composed by Bernard Herrmann for Gus Van Sant's 1998 shot-for-shot remake; recalling that experience, Elfman added "Not many people ever got that pleasure [...] Handling that score was like being a priest holding the Dead Sea Scrolls. It was that kind of honor."

However, for this film, Elfman consciously refrained from utilizing the score as an homage to Herrmann's work but at times "there were moments when I just wanted to allow his spirit in the door [...] Since he was part of the story, it was just too on-the-money to do that." Since the story focuses on the relationship between Alfred Hitchcock and Alma Reville, Elfman also described the score as fairly romantic that gets a little darker when Hitchcock enters the world of Psycho and the killer is talking to him. While inspiring Herrmann's work in bits and pieces, Elfman focused on producing the score to be much original. Hermann's Psycho score was eventually licensed from Sony/ATV Music Publishing Group by Gervasi and the crew to complement Elfman's score in a particular sequence.

Elfman recorded the orchestral music for two days, unlike contemporary orchestra musicians, he utilized half of the players for the score. Regarding the recording process, Gervasi said:

"He literally bought sections of the orchestra out of his own pocket [...] We were recording with the top musicians in London, and we couldn’t afford to keep them through lunch. Danny asked the orchestrator, ‘How much do the violas cost? £3,000? I’ll take them. How much for the French horns?’ And Danny held the musicians through lunch."

== Critical reception ==
Filmtracks.com wrote "Hitchcock is a fun score for the Elfman enthusiast and contains enough substance to justify its rather short album presentation. The themes do seem slightly underutilized, especially in how Elfman alternates between the darker and upbeat variations on the identity for the titular character. Then again, many of the film's best conversational moments exist without any music spotted in them, so the composer may have been restricted a bit in his opportunities for deeper development. Elfman collectors will be especially thrilled by how much of the composer's own musical personality thrives in this context, further connecting him with the Hitchcock and Herrmann legacy." Todd McCarthy of The Hollywood Reporter wrote that Elfman "does not ape Herrmann so much as weave around him to dexterous effect." Nathan Cone of Texas Public Radio wrote "Like the film itself, Elfman skims the surface of what could be an even deeper experience."

Daniel Schweiger of Assignment X wrote "Danny Elfman plays a sly, un-psychotic side of the Master of Suspense". A critic from Read Junk wrote "Hitchcock is a type of score to just put on and play because the tracks are too short to really appreciate the score." Both Sandy Schaefer of Screen Rant and Dana Stevens of Slate, appreciated the score being "Herrmann-esque".

== Track listing ==
Hitchcock (Original Motion Picture Soundtrack) track listing
No.	Title	Length
1.	"Logos"	0:49
2.	"Theme from Hitchcock"	1:22
3.	"The Premiere"	0:40
4.	"Paramount/Out the Gate"	1:56
5.	"Mommy Dearest"	0:58
6.	"In Bed"	0:36
7.	"Impulses"	1:29
8.	"The Censor"	0:59
9.	"The Swim"	2:03
10.	"Peeping"	0:36
11.	"Sacrifices"	1:16
12.	"Walk with Hitch"	0:56
13.	"Celery"	1:59
14.	"Telephone"	1:08
15.	"Suspicion"	2:30
16.	"Explosion"	3:11
17.	"Selling Psycho"	1:38
18.	"Fantasy Smashed"	1:30
19.	"The Sand"	1:22
20.	"It's a Wrap"	1:05
21.	"Busted"	0:58
22.	"Saving the House"	1:01
23.	"Finally"	1:46
24.	"Home at Last"	0:59
25.	"End Credit 1"	2:33
26.	"End Credit 2"	2:25
27.	"Funeral March for a Marionette"	0:53
Total length:		38:38

Hitchcock (Best Original Score) [For Your Consideration] track listing
No.	Title	Length
1.	"Premiere"	0:42
2.	"Too Old"	0:21
3.	"Paramount"	0:46
4.	"Peering"	0:21
5.	"Mommy Dearest"	1:00
6.	"Out of the Gate"	1:27
7.	"In the Bed"	0:42
8.	"The Censor"	1:00
9.	"Impulses"	1:31
10.	"Peeping"	0:39
11.	"Sacrifices"	1:20
12.	"Walk with Hitch"	0:58
13.	"The Swim"	2:04
14.	"Will It Work?"	0:28
15.	"Celery"	2:01
16.	"Telephone"	1:09
17.	"Suspicion"	2:31
18.	"Explosion"	3:11
19.	"The Sand"	1:23
20.	"Fantasy Smashed"	1:32
21.	"Busted"	0:59
22.	"Missing Alma"	0:26
23.	"Stillborn"	1:15
24.	"Saving the House"	1:02
25.	"It's a Wrap"	1:06
26.	"Selling Psycho"	1:39
27.	"Finally"	1:48
28.	"Home at Last"	1:01
29.	"Hitchcock End Credit Suite"	5:51
Total length:		40:13

== Personnel ==
Credits adapted from liner notes.

- Music composer and producer – Danny Elfman
- Recording – Nick Wollage
- Digital recorder – Adam Olmsted, Noah Snyder
- MIDI controller – Marc Mann
- Engineer – Chris Barrett, Fiona Cruickshank
- Mixing – Dennis Sands
- Assistant mixing– Greg Hayes
- Mastering – Pat Sullivan
- Score editor – Philip Tallman, Shie Rozow
- Technician – Greg Maloney
- Musical assistance – Melissa Karaban
- Music co-ordinator – Melisa McGregor

Orchestra

- Orchestration – Edgardo Simone, Steve Bartek
- Conductor – Rick Wentworth
- Orchestra leader – Everton Nelson
- Orchestra contractor – Isobel Griffiths
- Assistant orchestra contractor – Lucy Whalley
- Music preparation – Dave Hage

Instruments

- Cello – Anthony Pleeth
- Clarinet – Nicholas Bucknall
- Harp – Hugh Webb, Skaila Kanga
- Viola – Vicci Wardman
- Violin – Everton Nelson

== Accolades ==
Accolades for Hitchcock (Original Motion Picture Soundtrack)
Award	Date of ceremony	Category	Result	Ref(s)
Houston Film Critics Society	December 15, 2012	Best Original Score	Nominated	
International Film Music Critics Association	February 21, 2013	Film Composer of the Year	Won (Note: also for Dark Shadows, Frankenweenie, Men in Black 3, Silver Linings Playbook and Promised Land)	
World Soundtrack Awards	October 19, 2013	Soundtrack Composer of the Year	Nominated (Note: also for Epic, Frankenweenie, Silver Linings Playbook, Oz the Great and Powerful, Promised Land)	
