= Promised Land (soundtrack) =

Promised Land (Music from the Motion Picture)

Film score by Danny Elfman
- Released: December 25, 2012
- Recorded: 2012
- Studio: AIR Studios, London
- Genre: Film score
- Length: 38:55
- Label: Relativity Music Group; Sony Classical Records
- Producer: Danny Elfman

Danny Elfman chronology
| Hitchcock (2012) | Promised Land (2012) | Oz the Great and Powerful (2013) |

Promised Land (Music from the Motion Picture) is the film score composed by Danny Elfman to the 2012 film Promised Land directed by Gus Van Sant, starring Matt Damon, John Krasinski, Frances McDormand, Rosemarie DeWitt and Hal Holbrook. The score was recorded at the AIR Studios in London and jointly released through Relativity Music Group and Sony Classical Records on December 25, 2012.

== Development ==
In September 2012, it was announced that Danny Elfman, a longtime collaborator of Sant, would compose the film score for Promised Land. This was one of the multiple projects he signed during the period of 2011–2013; Elfman accepted the offer partly owing to his working relationship with Sant. When he first read the script, and thought of a country folk and Americana music with fiddles and guitars, due to the Americana setting. But Sant wanted something different, as he saw all of the Marimbas in Elfman's studio. Hence, the marimba served as the key musical component, where the score consisted of strings, marimba and guitar, with predominant vocals. Elfman added that "[Gus] just likes to try things, and that makes it fun for me, [whether it is right or wrong] can be a subjective thing". Hence, Elfman went with a small chamber orchestra for an intimate sound.

== Reception ==
Filmtracks wrote "The short, dryly mixed score makes for a decent, but not always engaging listening experience on album, the lack of more obvious themes a detriment." Danny King of The Film Stage called it a "surprisingly somber" score. Justin Chang of Variety stated that Elfman's score ably complemented the visuals. Jeannette Catsoulis of NPR called it an "ethereal score". Marjorie Baumgarten of The Austin Chronicle wrote "The score by Danny Elfman helps underscore this portrait of Americana".

== Track listing ==
| No. | Title | Length |
|---|---|---|
| 1. | "Logo" | 0:57 |
| 2. | "Traveling" | 2:39 |
| 3. | "Going to Work" | 2:41 |
| 4. | "The Meeting" | 3:12 |
| 5. | "The Bribe" | 1:21 |
| 6. | "Classroom" | 4:50 |
| 7. | "Turn Around" | 1:42 |
| 8. | "Time Lapse" | 1:10 |
| 9. | "Alice's Farm" | 3:02 |
| 10. | "Weepy Donuts" | 2:22 |
| 11. | "Lighthouse" | 1:56 |
| 12. | "Revelation" | 3:47 |
| 13. | "The Speech" | 2:08 |
| 14. | "Classroom" (Alternative Version) | 4:33 |
| 15. | "Snake Eyes" (The Milk Carton Kids) | 2:35 |
| Total length: | | 38:55 |

== Personnel ==
Credits adapted from liner notes:

- Music composer and producer – Danny Elfman
- Programming – TJ Lindgren
- MIDI supervision and preparation – Marc Mann
- Engineer – Chris Barrett, John Prestage
- Recording – Nick Wollage
- Digital recordist – Adam Olmstead, Noah Snyder
- Mixing – Dennis Sands
- Mixing assistance – Greg Hayes
- Mastering – Patricia Sullivan Fourstar
- Music editor – Lisa Jaime, Shie Rozow
- Music coordinator – Melissa Karaban
- Production coordinator – Melisa McGregor
- Copyist – David Hage
- Design – Jordan Butcher
- Technical assistance – Greg Maloney

Orchestra

- Orchestra – London Symphony Orchestra
- Orchestrated By – Edgardo Simone, Steve Bartek
- Conductor – Rick Wentworth
- Orchestra leader – Thomas Bowes
- Orchestra contractor – Isobel Griffiths
- Assistant orchestra contractor – Jo Changer

Choir

- Choir – Metro Voices
- Boys' choir – The Cardinal Vaughan Memorial School
- Choir leader – Jenny O'Grady

== Accolades ==
| Award | Date of ceremony | Category | Result | Ref(s) |
|---|---|---|---|---|
| International Film Music Critics Association | February 21, 2013 | Film Composer of the Year | Won (Note: also for Dark Shadows, Frankenweenie, Men in Black 3, Silver Linings Playbook and Hitchcock) | |
| World Soundtrack Awards | October 19, 2013 | Soundtrack Composer of the Year | Nominated (Note: also for Epic, Frankenweenie, Silver Linings Playbook, Oz the Great and Powerful, Hitchock) | |
