= Hudson Bay toad =

Scientific classification
- Kingdom: Animalia
- Phylum: Chordata
- Class: Amphibia
- Order: Anura
- Family: Bufonidae
- Genus: Anaxyrus
- Species: A. americanus
- Subspecies: A. a. copei

Trinomial name
- Anaxyrus americanus copei (Yarrow and Henshaw, 1878)

Synonyms
- Bufo copei Yarrow and Henshaw, 1878; Bufo americanus copei Yarrow and Henshaw, 1878

Subspecies of amphibian

The Hudson Bay toad (Anaxyrus americanus copei) is a rare subspecies of the American toad. As suggested by its name, it is found in the Hudson Bay region in Ontario and Quebec, Canada. However, the status of Anaxyrus americanus subspecies is unclear, and Anaxyrus americanus copei is not listed in the 2012 edition of the "Scientific and Standard English Names of Amphibians and Reptiles of North America North of Mexico".
