= Triumphant (Get 'Em) =

Single by Mariah Carey featuring Rick Ross and Meek Mill
- Released: August 3, 2012
- Recorded: 2012
- Studio: Southside Studios (Atlanta, GA); Jungle City Studios (New York, NY); Setai Recording Studios (Miami, FL); Studio at the Palms (Las Vegas, NV); Germano Studios (New York, NY)
- Genre: Hip hop
- Length: 4:10
- Label: Island
- Songwriters: Mariah Carey; Jermaine Dupri; Bryan-Michael Cox; William Roberts II; Robert Williams
- Producers: Mariah Carey; Jermaine Dupri; Bryan-Michael Cox

Mariah Carey singles chronology
"All I Want for Christmas Is You (SuperFestive!)" (2011)	"Triumphant (Get 'Em)" (2012)	"Almost Home" (2013)

Rick Ross singles chronology
"Hold Me Back" (2012)	"Triumphant (Get 'Em)" (2012)	"Diced Pineapples" (2012)

Meek Mill singles chronology
"My Moment" (2012)	"Triumphant (Get 'Em)" (2012)	"Burn" (2012)

Music video
- "Triumphant (Get 'Em)" on YouTube

"Triumphant (Get 'Em)" is a song by American singer Mariah Carey, featuring rappers Rick Ross and Meek Mill. It was written by Carey, Jermaine Dupri, Bryan-Michael Cox, Ross, and Mill and produced by Carey, Dupri and Cox. The song was released as a standalone single on August 3, 2012 by Island Records. Carey stated the song was written when her then-husband, actor Nick Cannon, was hospitalized with acute kidney failure in 2012, and was also inspired by the death of singer, and her friend, Whitney Houston.

The song is a mid tempo hip hop ballad that "mixes a soft beat with piano accompaniment." Its lyrics convey a message of self-worth and perseverance, with Carey urging listeners to "Reach for the stars / Be all that you are." The song received mixed reviews, with many saying the singer was overshadowed by the hip-hop duo, and should have had more presence on her comeback single. Two accompanying versions were released alongside the original, titled the "Pulse Club" and "Vintage Throwback" remixes. Commercial impact was also low, with the song charting at position 15 on the Bubbling Under Hot 100 chart before dropping off. Most critics attributed this to the song's low appeal to Top 40 formats and mainstream channels.

An accompanying music video for "Triumphant (Get 'Em)" was shot in New York City. Directed by Nick Cannon, it officially premiered on August 21, 2012, on Carey's official website and the following day digitally. The video, featuring a victorious boxing theme, portrays Carey and Ross as promoters as they cheer Mill during his match. The clip was generally well received, due to its cinematography and ties with the song's theme of perseverance and being "triumphant". Carey performed the song live for the first time on September 5, 2012, at Rockefeller Center. The performance marked the beginning of the new NFL season, starting with the New York Giants Vs. Dallas Cowboys game at the MetLife Stadium in New Jersey.

== Background and production ==
In September 2011, less than six months after giving birth to twins, Carey tweeted a picture of herself and Jermaine Dupri in a recording studio working on new material for her then-untitled upcoming fourteenth studio album, with the picture's caption reading "So happy to be back in the studio with the one & only @Mr_Dupri a.k.a. Jermash! We are back together." Following more speculation of the singer's return to the studio, Carey posted photos of herself and Rick Ross in Miami during late April, where the song was produced. Originally intended as the lead single from the singer's fourteenth studio album, "Triumphant (Get 'Em)" was written and produced by Carey, Dupri and Bryan-Michael Cox, with Ross and Meek Mill providing their verses. Relaying several hints regarding the song to the media, Carey explained the song's conception in a series of tweets on July 30, 2012: "I wrote Triumphant when I was going through a difficult time and it helped me get through it. When u hear it, pay attention to the lyrics." In an interview with MTV, Cox explained what fans would be able to expect from the song and why he felt Ross and Mill were "the perfect fit." He expressed how the "inspirational song" is close to Carey's heart and thought fans would become "emotionally attached" to it. Cox also added that Carey had committed herself to working on the album before she knew she was pregnant, but decided to halt its production until after she had given birth. With regard to the inclusion of the hip hop duo, he explained how they became involved with the project:

I think that Rick Ross is resilient, and Meek Mill [is] a new hot rapper, who's really hot, one of my favorite new hip hop artists. Rick Ross, who's always been one of my favorites, he's resilient. I think that, through the years, people try to count him out, and he always comes back, comes back harder, comes back with bigger and better records. So I think that the theme of 'Triumphant,' I think that he fits the theme of that whole concept the best, really, because through it all, Rick Ross always comes out on top.

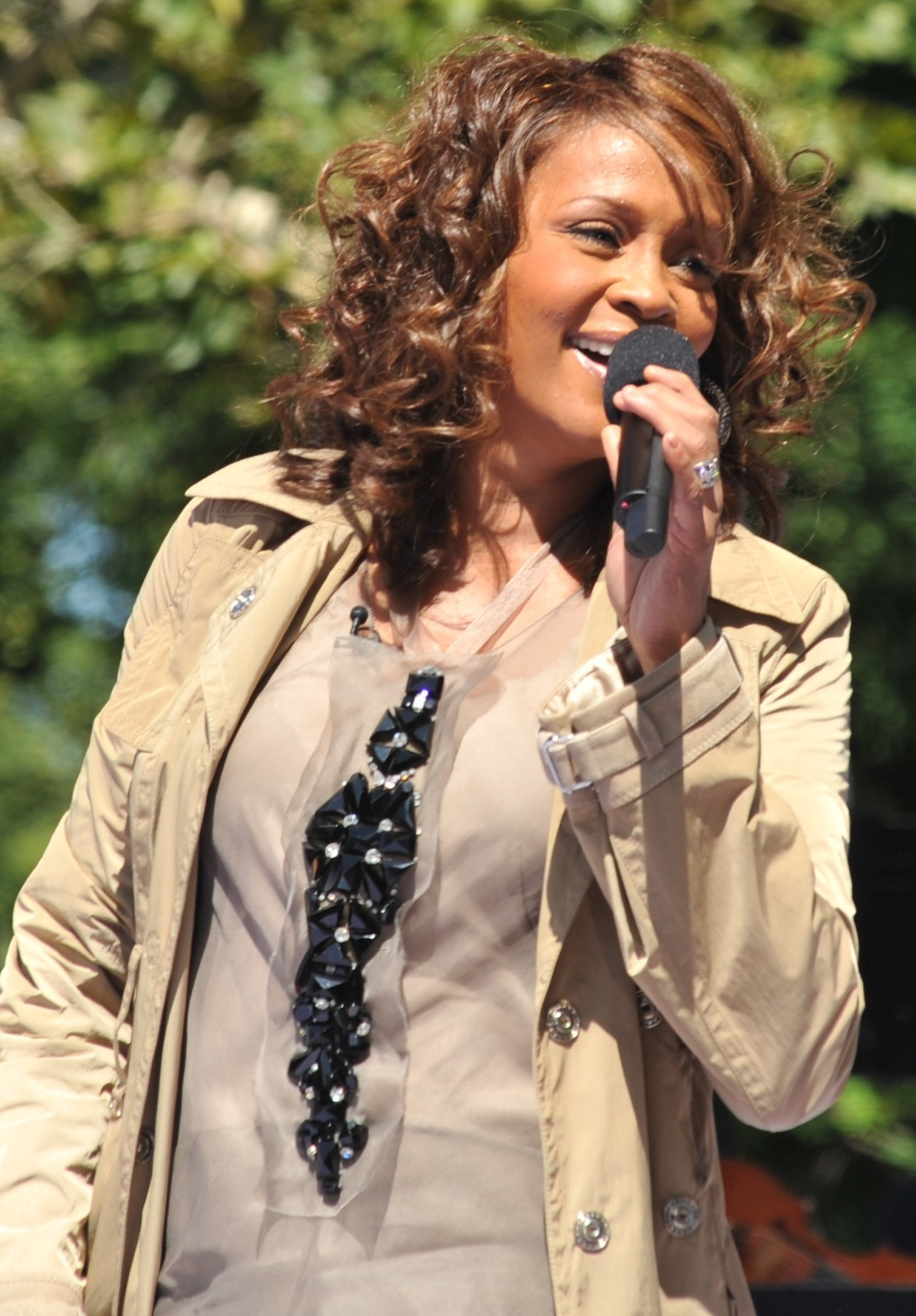
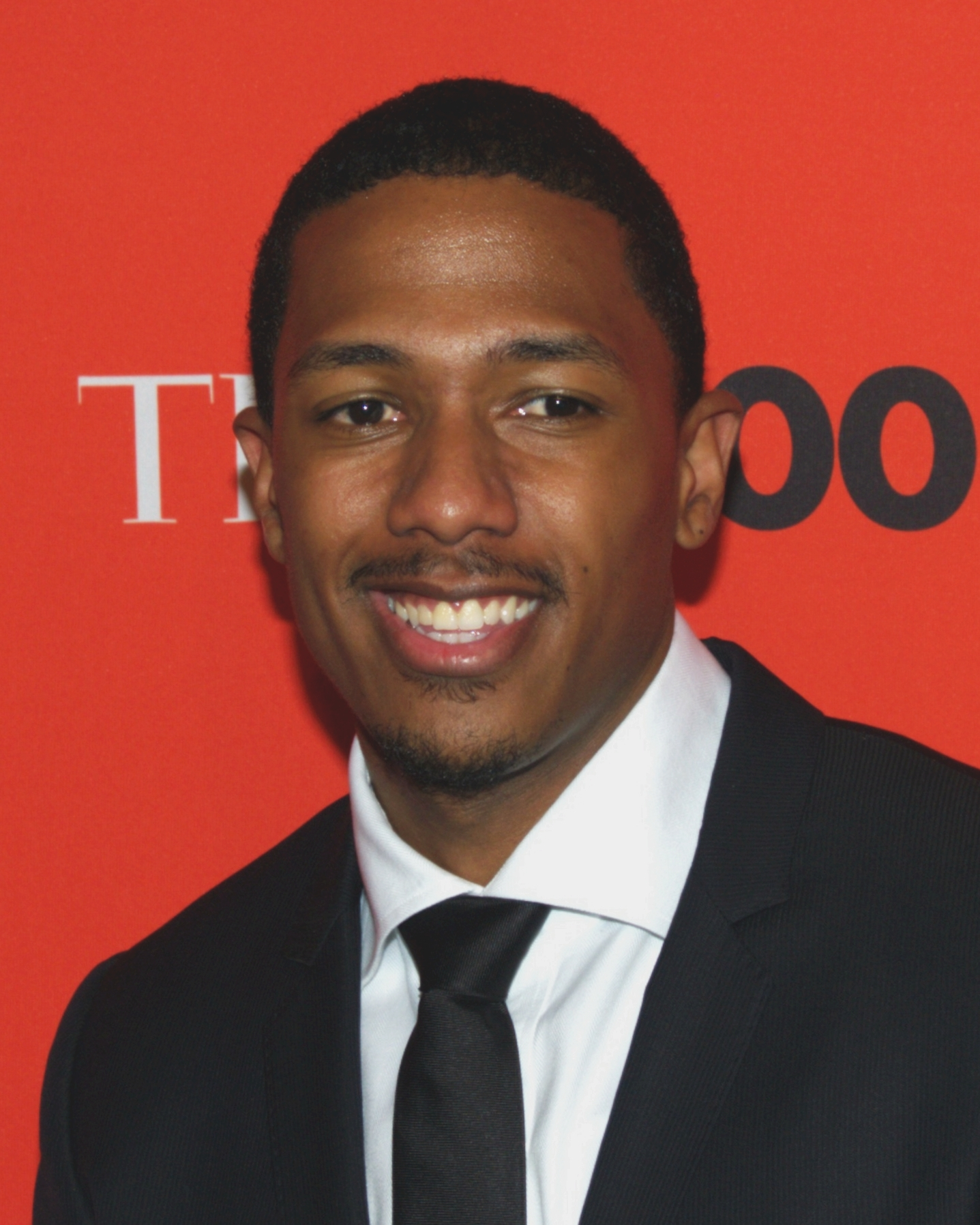
Whitney Houston and Nick Cannon (both pictured), inspired Carey to write the song

In a conference call with Billboard, Carey revealed that she wrote "Triumphant (Get 'Em)" while her husband, Nick Cannon, was hospitalized receiving medical treatment for mild kidney failure, saying "There's a lot of things you can take from there that can keep you going in a tough situation." Carey also added that the song was written around the time her friend, singer Whitney Houston, had died. "'We were actually in the hospital together when we saw it on TV.'[...] It was important for me to write something that would...help me get through the moment. That’s where ‘Stay triumphant, keep on living’ came from." Carey also expressed why she chosen Ross and Mill, or any hip-hop artist in general on the track, claiming that they are "different" and how she is always experimenting on collaborations with varying and new artists. When asked why she chose not to release a lead single which was dance influenced, Carey explained how she felt regarding the current music scene; "I think it would be incredible if we could bring back the days when R&B records didn't have to cross over but be massive hits on their own," and that was the reason why she did not want to conform to what is currently on trend. Additionally, she felt that "Triumphant (Get 'Em)", potentially, would be able to generate cross-appeal, and not only cater Mainstream Top 40. With specific emphasis on the dance music scene and its popularity, Carey stated that while she was pregnant, the vast majority of music that was being released was dance and electronic music, saying "I was pregnant forever, and I was being tortured day and night by techno music. I was complaining to everyone who was listening. One time I made dinner for L.A. Reid, and we were both sitting there like 'What happened?'" It saddened Carey that R&B and hip-hop music was being "bowled over" by dance music, and therefore wanted to remain true to herself by making traditional R&B music:

"I'm collaborating with a lot of my favorite people but the main thing is [that] I'm not trying to follow any particular trend. I want it to be well received. I want to stay true to myself and the music that I love and make the fans happy. It would be incredible if we can bring back the days where R&B songs didn't have to cross over. It makes me sad that there are so many talented R&B artists that don't get the chance that they should."

== Artwork and release ==
Carey revealed the single's artwork via her Instagram account on July 30, 2012. A critic for the Belfast Telegraph also noted that Carey poses "seductively" for the shot. Robbie Daw for Idolator noted that it appeared as though the artwork had been photoshopped and that it is reminiscent of the cover art of Carey's tenth studio album, The Emancipation of Mimi (2005). A writer from MTV found the shot "endlessly entertaining", while Declan Cashin of The Independent wrote: "Carey is depicted in golden hues as if she's radiating the precious shimmering element from her very being."

On August 1, a 30-second low quality snippet of Ross' verse was released, only one day prior to its scheduled release. Carey later confirmed via her official Twitter account that "Triumphant (Get 'Em)" would make its premiere on August 2, 2012, at 3:45pm on the B96 Chicago radio station. However, the station failed to premiere the song, and instead made its official debut on her website. The song received its official radio release later that day at 6:20pm CST on the B96 radio station, almost three hours later than scheduled. It was made available to download digitally via iTunes on August 3, 2012, in The Netherlands, Belgium, Ireland, Italy, Switzerland, and the United Kingdom. On August 7, "Triumphant (Get 'Em)" made its stateside digital download premiere. Island/Def Jam serviced the hip-hop version to R&B/hip-hop radio on August 13, and currently "mapping out strategies to deliver other versions across dance formats."

== Composition and lyrics ==
"Triumphant (Get 'Em)"
A sample of the song's chorus, followed by Ross' rap intro. Carey's vocals spans the tonal range of G♯_{2} to B♭_{5} belt and G♯_{7} in whistle register. Instrumentally, "Triumphant (Get 'Em)" is a midtempo R&B and hip hop ballad that "mixes a soft beat with piano accompaniment."

"Triumphant (Get 'Em)" is a mid tempo hip hop ballad that "mixes a soft beat with piano accompaniment." Written during a difficult time in Carey's personal life, the song boasts inspirational lyrics of self-worth and achievement. The song begins with an introductory verse from Mill, followed by Ross on the second verse. Though "cooing" throughout the chorus, Carey's begins singing during the song's bridge and final crescendo, where she displays her whistle register. Carey's vocals spans the tonal range of G♯_{2} to B♭_{5} belt and G♯_{7} high note. The track opens with Mill, whose verse quickly sums up the theme of the track: "The only way to make it to the top is if you go and get it from the bottom ... I remember they said that it ain't my turn/ Just look at me now/ Try to hold me down, but I ain't gonna stop/ 'Cause I'm gonna climb to the mountaintop." During the song's chorus, Carey sings of not being able to be torn down by others and "staying triumphant", before continuing: "Don't let 'em ever count you out/ Realize all things are possible/ In your heart who's the greatest/ Reach for the stars/ Be all that you are."

During the second verse, Ross' lyrics are somewhat different, "Red bottom Bawse house big as Baltimore" and "With a blonde bombshell trying to bond with your boy." Additionally, he makes reference to strippers, as well as driving with a suspended drivers' license. Throughout the bridge, Carey sings about achieving despite surrounding odds: "In spite of the chains that bind you/ You can see the mountain top/ It’s not too far." Additionally, towards the last chorus, the singer releases a series of her "signature" high notes. During an August 2, conference call, Carey described how she felt working with the duo, and how she felt Ross' voice blended well with her own: "Working with Ross and Meek on the same record was incredible. Obviously Ross is a star and everybody loves him. I'm a fan of his music," said Carey on the collaboration. "I really, really wanted to work with him. I love the tone of his voice. I think the contrast of his voice and mine would be something special. I always like to do collaborations that people might think are different."

== Remixes ==
"Triumphant (Get 'Em)" (Vintage Throwback Remix)
A sample of the song's dance/club remix; its built around a "thumping bass line". Critics lauded the remix by comparison, and felt Carey's sole singing sold its "inspirational message of perseverance" far more than the original.

After the original version of "Triumphant (Get 'Em)" was released, Carey's official website premiered two other versions of the song, the "Vintage Throwback Remix" and the "Pulse Club Remix". While the song's initial release was tepidly received by critics, reviewers were more favorable towards the remixes. The remixes only feature Carey and eliminate the extensive rap verses with which many critics took issue. According to Carey's manager, Randy Jackson, three versions of the song were released in order to monopolize all radio formats and cater to multiple audiences. In an interview with Billboard, Jackson expressed how they would remind Carey's fans of her earlier remixes, which she would always re-do her vocals: "The vintage throwback mix will remind fans of remixes she did years ago, and she's had a lot of Billboard No. 1 dance hits as well. She went in and re-sang the vocals, knowing that the two verses on this first version of this single with Meek and Ross were going to be hip-hop verses where people were rapping. We wanted to have something for all of her fans."

During a press release for the single and its accompanying remixes, Carey said the following regarding the re-recorded vocals: "I’ve always had so much fun re-singing my songs for the club/dance mixes. It gives me the freedom to sing as powerfully as I want and to rewrite the songs specifically for the genre." Sal Cinquemani of Slant Magazine, who was critical of the song's original version, praised the "Vintage Throwback Remix". He felt it was more of what the original "should have been" and concluded: "a rousing vocal arrangement at the song's climax sells Mariah's inspirational message of perseverance and harks back to her '90s heyday." Idolator's Becky Bain called the remix far more "captivating" than the original, and felt its re-recorded vocals showcased the singer's "one-of-a-kind range."

== Reception ==
=== Critical ===
Professional ratings
Review scores
Source	Rating
The Irish Times	2/5 stars

"Pop singer Mariah Carey has gone through some trials and tribulations in her life. Her journey through the music industry would be enough to make a lesser person end it all. But Mariah is a survivor and she will always remain triumphant in the face of opposition. Carey showcases her persevering spirit on the new song 'Triumphant (Get ‘Em).'"
—The Daily Urban's, Jonathan Hailey

While some critics appreciated the features and urban appeal of "Triumphant (Get 'Em)", many criticized Carey's lack of presence on the song. While describing the singer as taking the "back-seat" throughout a large portion of the song, Becky Bain from Idolator complimented Carey's vocal runs towards the bridge and final chorus. Spin's Julianne Shepherd felt that while a strong release, "Triumphant (Get 'Em)" didn't feature enough of Carey, given the near three-year gap between her last release, Memoirs of an Imperfect Angel (2009). A writer from Rolling Stone described the singer as "bewilderingly AWOL" throughout most of the song, but felt that she was "on-point" during her part. In a similar vein, Robert Conrey from Digital Spy was disappointed with the song's "lack of Mariah Carey."

While Rap-Up hailed "Triumphant (Get 'Em)" as an "uplifting anthem", Sal Cinquemani of Slant Magazine called the song the "worst lead single (possibly the worst single, period) of her two-decade-plus career." He criticized Carey's lack of originality with the song; describing its production as "dated". Leah Collins of The Vancouver Sun felt the track's lyrics lacked inspiration, comparing them to poems from Hallmark Cards. A critic from Artistdirect awarded the song five out of five stars, writing, "with soulful swagger and classic R&B poise, she delivers the track's stadium-size hook over bombastic, orchestral production."

=== Commercial ===
Following in suit of its lukewarm critical response, "Triumphant (Get 'Em)" made little impact on the charts. The song made its debut on the US Billboard Hot R&B/Hip-Hop Songs chart on August 9, 2012, at number 97. It debuted on the US Bubbling Under Hot 100 Singles chart for the issue dated August 25, 2012, at number 15, representing the 25 songs that haven't entered the Billboard Hot 100. During the week dated August 11, 2012, the single debuted at number three on the South Korea Gaon International Chart, with 35,870 digital download sales. "Triumphant (Get 'Em)" entered the UK Singles Chart issue dated at number 144 on August 15, 2012, and at number 29 on the UK R&B Chart. Similarly, it charted at number 135 during its debut week on the French Singles Chart. In Spain, the song debuted at number 36 on August 12, 2012. Critics attributed the song's initial weak charting to its urban sound, describing it as having little Mainstream Top 40 or crossover appeal. According to The Huffington Post, due to radio's bias against artists over age 40, "It’s not like people are listening to the song and deciding they don’t like it; [with Mariah] they are not even listening. If radio isn’t playing it, then that’s a problem." The song peaked at number-one on the Dance Club Songs chart on the week of October 27, 2012, becoming Carey's sixteenth single to top the chart. The song also reached top 10 on the Hot Dance Singles Sales chart, where it peaked at #9 on the week of September 22, 2012. It is her final single on the chart. "Triumphant (Get 'Em)" has sold 71,000 digital downloads in the United States as of February 2014.

== Music video ==
=== Background ===
An accompanying music video for "Triumphant (Get 'Em)" was shot on July 29 and 30, 2012, in New York City. It was directed and produced by Carey's husband Nick Cannon. Described as a "tease" by Rap-Up, Carey tweeted a picture of herself on set of the music video. Dressed in a red satin gown and "dripping with diamonds", Carey was photographed lying on a sofa. Three days prior to the video's release, Carey released a promotional still on her official Instagram account. Featuring Mill with his back towards the camera, the word "TRIUMPHANT" was splayed across his golden robe. Another photo surfaced later on that day, revealing the trio's entrance into the boxing auditorium. Reviewing the second still, MTV's Julia Brokow described Carey's ensemble as "ever-glamorous", and assured the video would not disappoint. After viewing the shots, Jocelyn Vena, also from MTV, felt the video's theme was a "fitting metaphor for the song." The video premiered on BET's 106 & Park on August 21, 2012.

=== Synopsis ===
A still from the video's climax, in which Carey is shown singing ringside as confetti rains down. Critics noted this as the highlight of the video, and felt her passionate singing tied in well with the song's lyrical message.

The music video revolves around a boxing match theme. Mill portrays an underground boxer, while Carey and Ross, presumably as promoters. Opening with the entrance of the trio, the video begins with a hooded Mill entering a large dark auditorium. As he walks towards the ring, Carey and Ross accompany him on each side. As the video progresses into the first verse, close-up shots of Mill during the match are shown, as a large audience cheers them on. Additionally, Mill can be seen rapping to the song's lyrics as the camera zooms on him during each round recovery. During the chorus, Carey makes a secondary appearance in a floor-length copper gown, while standing on a large golden and lightened platform. During Ross' verse, DJ Khaled makes a cameo appearance as the former is shown on the golden stage, as well as ringside. As the song progresses, Carey is shown as a "ring girl", walking around with several numbered signs. Towards the end of the match, scenes are interspersed with Carey standing alone in the ring belting the remainder of the song. During the video's climax, confetti falls to the ground as she completes the song and walks to the ring's edge.

=== Reception ===
Following its premiere, the video for "Triumphant (Get 'Em)" was generally well received by critics. E!'s Bruna Nessif commended Carey's "post-baby body", and wrote "[the singer] made sure to let us know that her comeback isn't only in the music world, but physically, too." Tanner Stransky from Entertainment Weekly felt the video was "very fitting" for the song's vibe, and felt it presented "a distinct level of Mimi fabulosity." The Hollywood Reporter's David Lipshutz described the video as a "glitzy clip". Additionally, he outed its final segment of "Carey singing while confetti rain down" as the video's highlight. While noting the video's "classic Mimi fashions", MTV's Jocelyn Vena expressed how Carey's ringside singing during the finale truly tied in with the song's message of "overcoming adversity". Marc Hogan of Spin noted it as "expensive-looking and cinematic", while a writer from CNN described the singer as "glamorous as ever."

== Live performance ==
Carey performed the song live only one time on September 5, 2012, at Rockefeller Center. Sharing the stage with both No Doubt and Cee Lo Green, the hour long program was filmed live at 7:30PM EST on NBC. The performances marked the beginning of the new NFL season, starting with the New York Giants Vs. Dallas Cowboys at the MetLife Stadium in East Rutherford, New Jersey. According to the CBS News, Carey says she's "thrilled to be performing in New York – her hometown – and adds she's looking forward to making the season launch 'even more festive.'"

== Track listing and formats ==
- Digital download
1. "Triumphant (Get 'Em)" [featuring Rick Ross and Meek Mill] — 4:10
- Digital download – Pulse Club Remix
1. "Triumphant" (Pulse Club Remix Extended) — 5:27
- Digital download – Vintage Throwback Mix
1. "Triumphant" (Vintage Throwback Mix) — 4:53

== Credits ==
Personnel

- Songwriting – Mariah Carey, Jermaine Dupri, Bryan-Michael Cox, William L. Roberts II, Robert R. Williams
- Production – Mariah Carey, Jermaine Dupri, Bryan-Michael Cox

Credits adapted from Rap-Up.

== Charts ==
=== Weekly charts ===
Chart (2012)	Peak position
Australia Urban (ARIA)	35
Belgium (Ultratip Bubbling Under Flanders)	91
Belgium (Ultratip Bubbling Under Wallonia)	35
France (SNEP)	135
Germany Urban (Deutsche Black Charts)	4
Global Dance Songs (Billboard)	16
Hong Kong (Metro Radio)	12
Japan Hot 100 (Billboard)	48
South Korea International (Circle)	3
South Korea International (Circle) Pulse Remix (Extended)	84
Spain (Promusicae)	36
UK Singles (OCC)	144
UK R&B (OCC)	29
UK Urban Club (Music Week)	1
US Bubbling Under Hot 100 Singles (Billboard)	15
US Dance Club Songs (Billboard)	1
US Dance Singles Sales (Billboard)	9
US Hot R&B/Hip-Hop Songs (Billboard)	53

=== Year-end charts ===
Chart (2013)	Position
US Hot Dance Club Songs (Billboard)	39

== Release history ==
Country	Date	Format	Record Label
Argentina	August 3, 2012	Digital download	Universal Music
Australia	August 3, 2012	Digital download	Universal Music
Belgium	August 3, 2012	Digital download	Universal Music
Brazil	August 3, 2012	Digital download	Universal Music
Czech Republic	August 3, 2012	Digital download	Universal Music
Denmark	August 3, 2012	Digital download	Universal Music
France	August 3, 2012	Digital download	Universal Music
Hungary	August 3, 2012	Digital download	Universal Music
Greece	August 3, 2012	Digital download	Universal Music
Ireland	August 3, 2012	Digital download	Universal Music
Italy	August 3, 2012	Digital download	Universal Music
Netherlands	August 3, 2012	Digital download	Universal Music
Norway	August 3, 2012	Digital download	Universal Music
Portugal	August 3, 2012	Digital download	Universal Music
Spain	August 3, 2012	Digital download	Universal Music
Switzerland	August 3, 2012	Digital download	Universal Music
United Kingdom	August 3, 2012	Digital download	Mercury Records
United States	August 7, 2012	Digital download	Island Records
United States	August 14, 2012	Rhythmic and urban radio	Island Records
United States	August 14, 2012	Digital Remix – Pulse Extended Mix	Island Records
United States	August 14, 2012	Digital Remix Vintage Throwback Mix	Island Records

== See also ==
- List of number-one dance singles of 2012 (U.S.)
