= Almost Home (Mariah Carey song) =

Single by Mariah Carey

from the album Oz the Great and Powerful soundtrack
- Released: February 19, 2013
- Recorded: 2013
- Studio: Roc the Mic Studios, New York City
- Genre: Pop; electropop; hip hop; R&B
- Length: 3:48
- Label: Walt Disney; Island Def Jam
- Songwriters: Mariah Carey; Simone Porter; Justin Gray; Lindsey Ray; Tor Erik Hermansen; Mikkel Eriksen
- Producers: Mariah Carey; Stargate

Mariah Carey singles chronology
"Triumphant (Get 'Em)" (2012)	"Almost Home" (2013)	"#Beautiful" (2013)

Music video
- "Almost Home" on YouTube

"Almost Home" is a song recorded by American singer-songwriter Mariah Carey. It is the main track from the 2013 Walt Disney Pictures film Oz the Great and Powerful. Commissioned by Disney, Simone Porter, Justin Gray, and Lindsey Ray wrote the bulk of the record. When Carey signed on to sing the song, she and Stargate's Tor Erik Hermansen and Mikkel Eriksen would later change it a bit and ultimately, complete it. On February 6, 2013, it was announced that Mariah Carey had recorded the song for the Disney film with production team Stargate, and that it would be released through digital download on February 19, 2013.

The song delivers an inspirational message, "Almost Home" has received generally favorable reviews from music critics, many of whom praised the vocal performance of Carey, calling it a "return" to her sound of the 1990s after the lukewarm reviews given to her recent releases, including "Triumphant (Get 'Em)" (2012). Following the announcement of the single, it was revealed that Carey had recorded an accompanying music video, directed by David LaChapelle. The video premiered on March 8, 2013, the same day Oz the Great and Powerful was released theatrically.

== Background and composition ==
"Almost Home" (2013)
A 23-second sample of "Almost Home", where Carey delivers an inspirational message, singing the song's chorus with strong vocals.

On February 6, 2013, it was revealed that Carey was working with Stargate on a song titled "Almost Home", as the lead single from the soundtrack album for the movie Oz the Great and Powerful, with the singer saying in a statement that the song has "a message that works beautifully with the film. It's a feel-good record; it gives you the feeling of reaching your home and being with people that you love." Carey has since stated that she dislikes the song, stating that it "didn't feel like her at all", a criticism she also gives to several songs other people wrote. The song was recorded in New York City at Roc The Mic Studios, and released in a partnership between Def Jam Recordings and Disney Music Group for the promotional campaign for the movie. The single's artwork was unveiled through Carey's Instagram account on February 14, 2013, with the single itself being released on February 19, 2013. However, it leaked the day before.

A pop song, "Almost Home" contains elements of other music genres such as R&B, hip hop and EDM. Carey delivers an inspirational message with the song, and, as described by Jocelyn Vena of MTV, the singer's placed "right in the mythical land from the famed movie", singing during the chorus, "When you're almost there / And you're almost home / Just open up your eyes and go / When you're almost there / Almost home / Know you're not alone / You're almost home."

The song is performed in the key of B♭ major in common time with a tempo of 87 beats per minute. For the final chorus, the song's key shifts up one semitone to B major. Carey's vocal range spans from F_{3} to E_{5} in the song.

== Critical response ==
"Almost Home" has received generally favorable reviews from music critics. Alyssa Toomey from E! praised the song, writing, "If you've ever closed your eyes, clicked your heels and wished for more Mariah Carey, then you're in luck, because your musical prayers have been answered", while Jody Rosen of Rolling Stone considered the song's chorus as infectious. Los Angeles Times reviewer Mikael Wood said the song is not as powerful as Carey's "Always Be My Baby" (1995) or "We Belong Together" (2005), but thought the instrumentation was entirely built around her vocals, "which arc upward until they crest in a key change that delivers the thrill we've grown to expect from her.". Alisha Harris of Slate Magazine was surprised of Carey's appearance on this single as a pop star and stated Carey's dominance twenty years post her debut: "“The minimalist beat sounds rather over familiar at this point, echoing various hits going back to the late ’90s. The song is pleasant enough in parts, but almost instantly forgettable. As a Carey fan, I’m holding out hope that her new album will have more memorable tracks, even if her lead single, released last year, was also less than stellar. And while the ballad certainly doesn’t rank among the singer’s best work, it does provide the latest evidence of what we can count on after all these years: She’s still got the voice.”

Sal Cinquemani of Slant Magazine said that, with "Almost Home" and "Triumphant (Get 'Em)", Carey proves she still is "the queen of playing it safe," continuing that her vocals are heavily Auto-Tuned to the point of being "virtually unrecognizable". Cinquemani also thought the song was over-produced and dated, comparing it to Alicia Keys' 2007 single "No One". Kyle Anderson of Entertainment Weekly gave a mixed review on the song, saying that while Carey's "body of work is pretty phenomenal, [...] it has been a while since she delivered a really transcendent single." Anderson continued saying that "Almost Home" could have been sung by most anybody. Melinda Newman of Hitfix was critical towards "Almost Home", deeming the instrumentation as "cheesy", and commenting that Carey sounds bored singing the song, with her vocals being heavily compressed.

== Commercial performance ==
In France, the song managed to peak at number 185. The song sold 19,000 digital downloads in its debut week in the United States. Despite the weak performance, "Almost Home" managed to peak within the top 20 on the R&B Songs and the Adult Contemporary charts at number 18 and 20 respectively. In Lebanon, the song peaked at number 10, becoming the artist's first top 10 hit in the country. "Almost Home" has sold 48,000 digital downloads in the United States as of February 2014.

== Music video ==
=== Synopsis and background ===
Following the announcement of the single, it was revealed that Carey had recorded an accompanying music video, directed by David LaChapelle, who previously directed the music video for Carey's "Loverboy" (2001). On February 19, 2013, a teaser of the video was aired on Good Morning America. The video premiered on March 8, 2013 at Carey's VEVO channel, the same day Oz the Great and Powerful hit theaters. LaChapelle captures the singer belting the Stargate co-produced song, alone, while donning a floor-length black gown. The photographer-director incorporates footage from the fantasy feature throughout the 3 1/2-minute-long visual.

=== Reception ===
Almost Home was met with mixed reviews by critics. Entertainment Weekly felt that the song "could go either way," and considered the beat to be vanilla and the chorus to be somewhat vanilla. The Los Angeles Times was similarly divided, noting that the key-change delivered "the thrill we've grown to expect from her," though simultaneously calling the song "not as great nor as powerful" as some of her previous hits.

=== Accolades ===
Award	Category	Result
2013 Georgia Film Critics Association	Best Original Song	Nominated
2013 World Music Awards	World's Best Video	Won

== Track listing ==
Digital download

1. "Almost Home" – 3:47

== Credits and personnel ==
Recording

- Recorded at Roc the Mic Studios, New York City

Personnel

- Mariah Carey: Lead vocalist, singer, songwriter, producer.
- Justin Gray: Writer, producer
- Lindsey Ray: singer, songwriter
- Mikkel Storleer Eriksen & Tor Erik Hermansen: Record producers, songwriters
- Simone Porter: songwriter.
- Production, instruments, programming – Def Jam, Disney Music Group

== Charts ==
=== Weekly charts ===
Weekly chart performance for "Almost Home"
Chart (2013)	Peak position
Belgium (Ultratip Bubbling Under Flanders)	8
Belgium (Ultratip Bubbling Under Wallonia)	2
France (SNEP)	185
Japan Hot 100 (Billboard)	59
Lebanon (OLT20)	10
South Korea International (Circle)	9
Spain (Promusicae)	41
US Bubbling Under R&B/Hip-Hop Singles (Billboard)	1
US Adult Contemporary (Billboard)	20
US R&B Songs (Billboard)	18

=== Year-end charts ===
Year-end chart performance for "Almost Home"
Chart (2013)	Position
Ukraine Airplay (TopHit)	159

== Sales ==
Region	Certification	Certified units/sales
South Korea (Gaon)	—	43,828

== Radio and release history ==
Country	Date	Format	Label
Worldwide	February 19, 2013	Digital download	Island Records; Universal Music
Australia	February 20, 2013	Contemporary hit radio	Island Records; Universal Music
Italy	March 1, 2013	Contemporary hit radio	Universal Music
