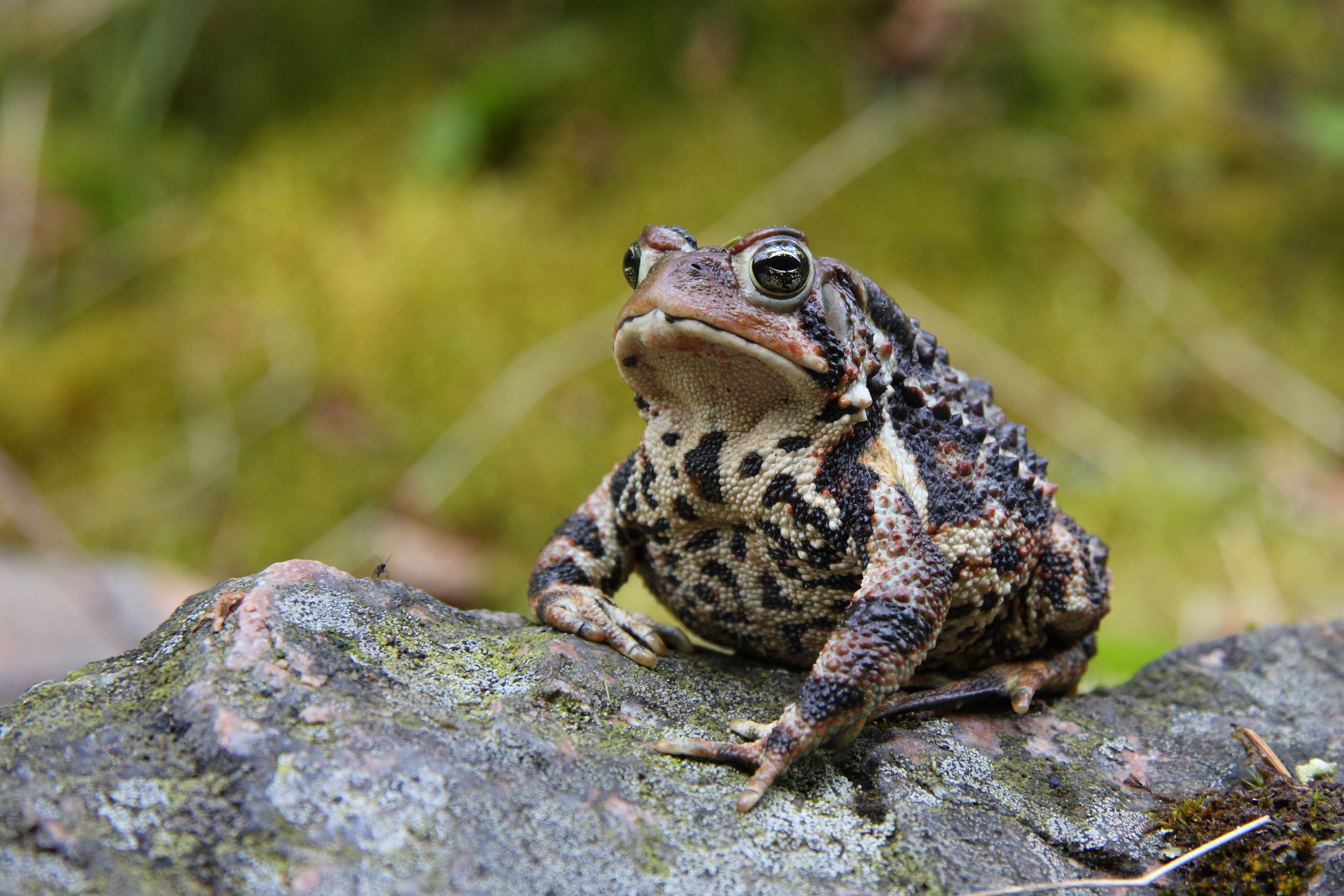
- Specimen from Jacques-Cartier National Park, Quebec, Canada

Conservation status
- Least Concern (IUCN 3.1)

- Secure (NatureServe)

Scientific classification
- Kingdom: Animalia
- Phylum: Chordata
- Class: Amphibia
- Order: Anura
- Family: Bufonidae
- Genus: Anaxyrus
- Species: A. americanus

Binomial name
- Anaxyrus americanus (Holbrook, 1836)

Subspecies
- A. a. americanus; A. a. charlesmithi; A. a. copei
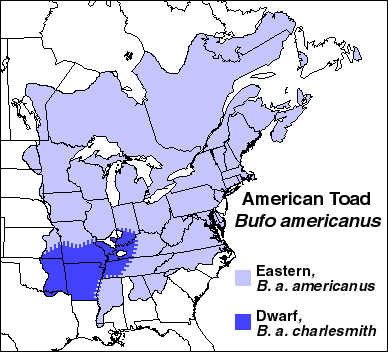
- Range of A. americanus

Synonyms
- Bufo americanus Holbrook, 1836

Audio

= American toad =

Species of amphibian

The American toad (Anaxyrus americanus) is a common species of toad found throughout the eastern half of Canada and the United States. It is divided into three subspecies: the eastern American toad (A. a. americanus), the dwarf American toad (A. a. charlesmithi) and the rare Hudson Bay toad (A. a. copei). Taxonomic treatments in 2006 placed this species in the genus Anaxyrus instead of Bufo.

== Eggs ==
Anaxyrus americanus lays eggs in two long ropes of 2,000–20,000 small black eggs (1-2 mm in diameter) surrounded by jelly. Egg strings are in shallow water, typically entwined around vegetation or laying on the bottom of the pond.

== Tadpoles ==
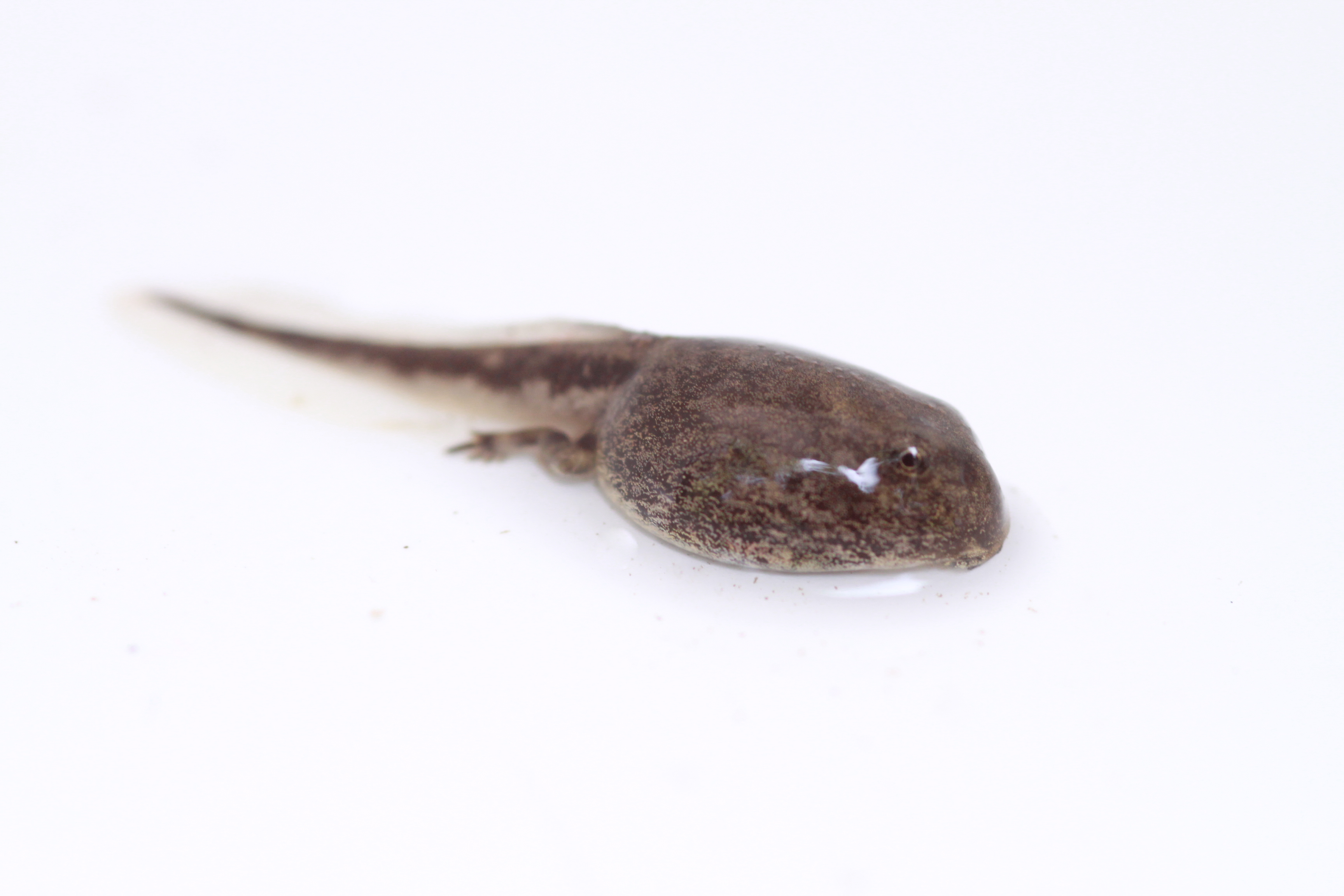
Tadpole of A. americanus

American toad eggs hatch into tadpoles in 3 to 12 days. The hatched tadpoles, while very small, are recognizable by their skinny tails in relation to the size of their round black bodies. They reach adulthood in 50–65 days. When metamorphosis is complete, the toadlets may stay in the water for a short period of time before transitioning to be mostly land based. Often times, groups of tadpoles reach the toadlet stage at once and a begin a mass migration to higher ground. Typically, toadlets migrate to shaded areas in the mid-range and upland forests that border the marshes where they were bred. Toadlets can be observed eating microscopic bugs in their roaming ground between various vegetation; they are also known to eat ants, spiders, slugs and worms. Studies have shown that they have a mutualistic relationship with Chlorogonium algae, which makes tadpoles develop faster than normal. Leaf litter from invasive plants like autumn olive or purple loosestrife in the larval nursery can increase the burden of trematode parasite infestation among tadpoles. This is possibly mediated by faster development of tadpoles in these aquatic environments than in nurseries with leaves of native black huckleberry or swamp loosestrife.

Tadpoles have several mechanisms to reduce predation. They avoid predators by swimming in very shallow water often with thick grass vegetation and by swimming close together in schools during the day. Tadpoles also produce toxic chemicals in their skin that discourage some predation. Fish have been reported to die after consuming one tadpole; however, most fish quickly learn to avoid eating American toad tadpoles.

== Biogeography ==
Based on DNA sequence comparisons, Anaxyrus americanus and other North American species of Anaxyrus are thought to be descended from an invasion of toads from South America prior to the formation of the Isthmus of Panama land bridge, presumably by means of rafting.

== Subspecies ==
Races tend to hybridize with Anaxyrus woodhousii in their overlapping ranges.

=== Eastern American toad ===
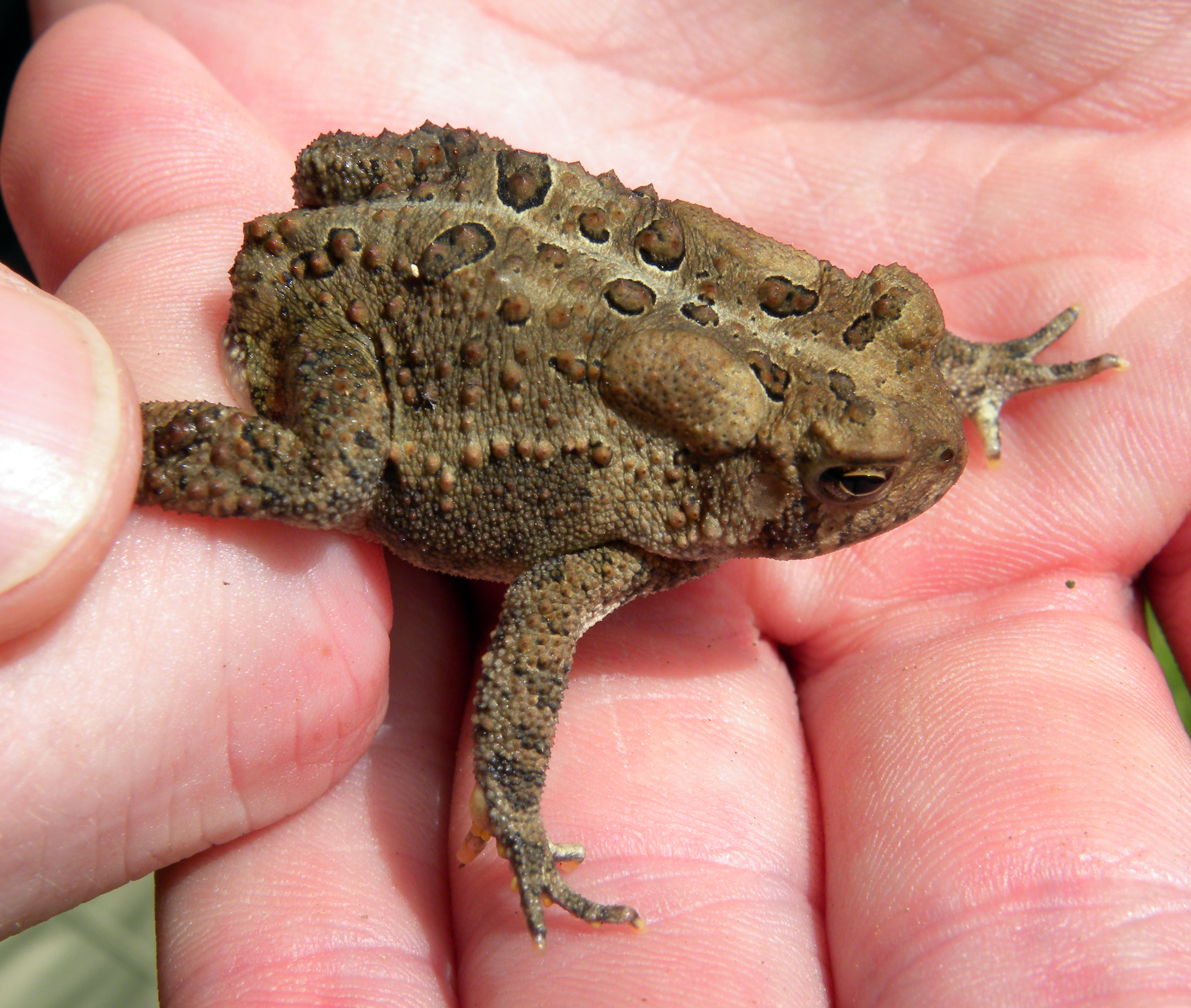
Eastern American toad in Ohio

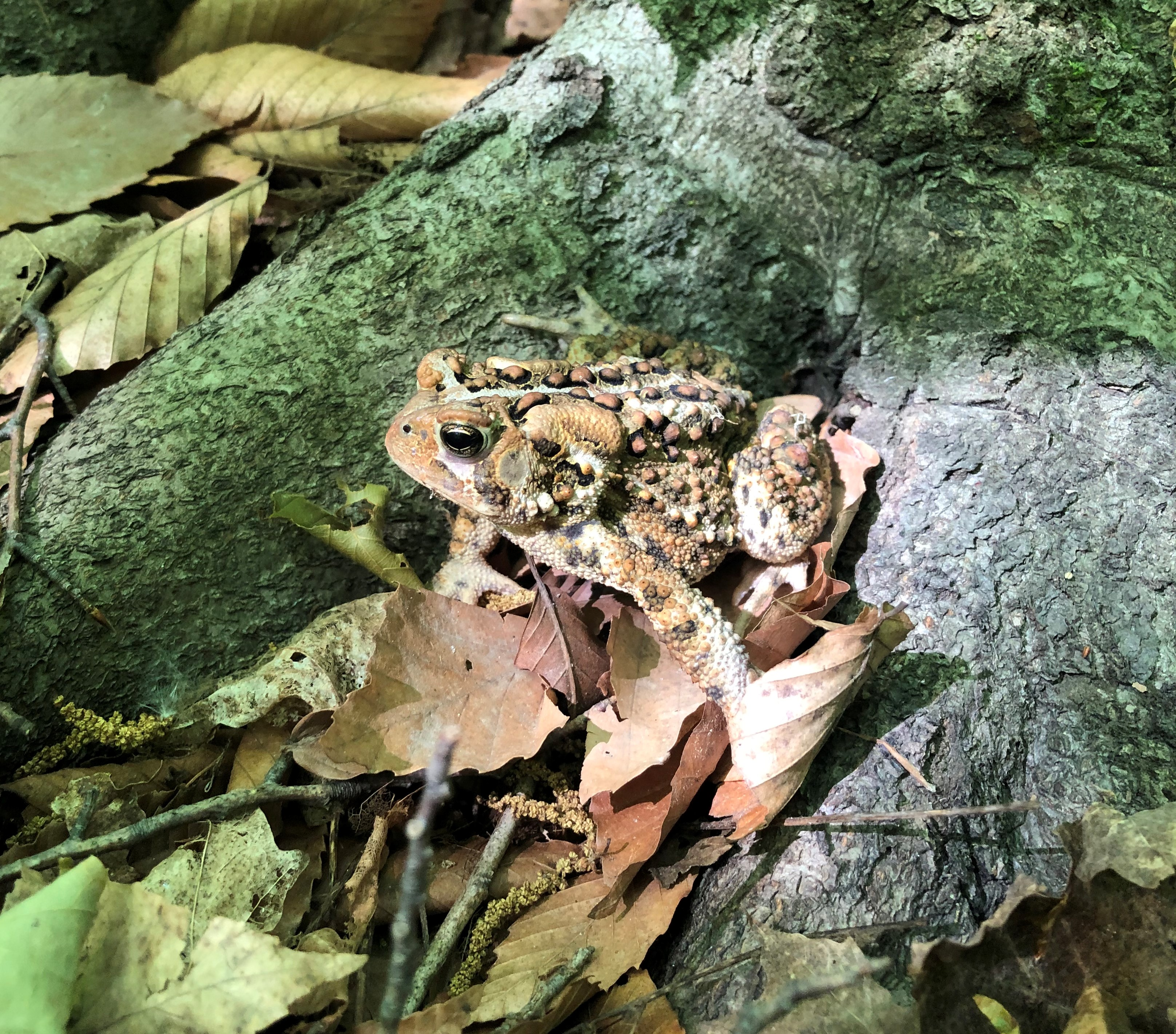
Eastern American toad showing ground leaf camouflage in Darien Lakes State Park

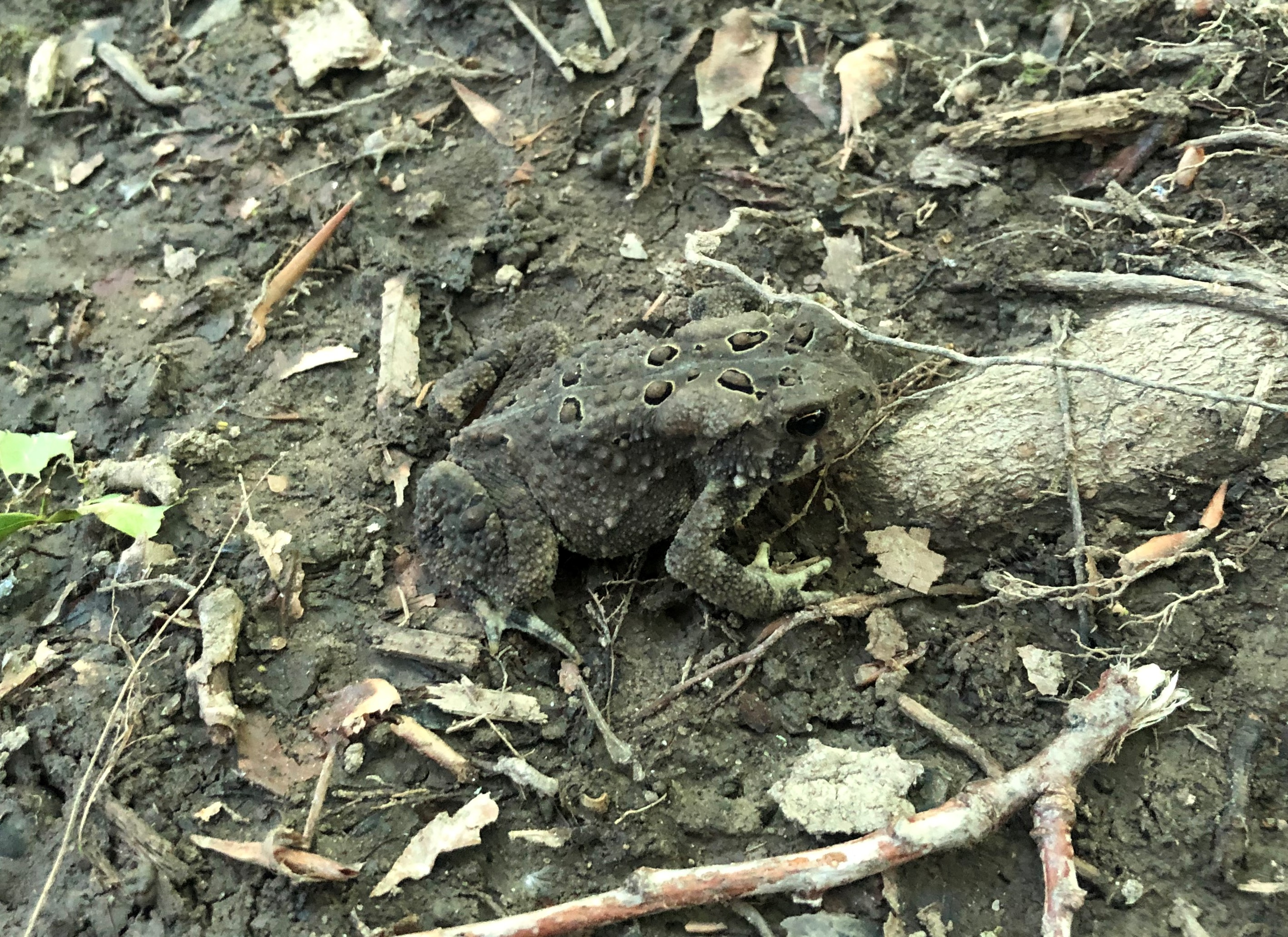
Eastern American toad showing bare ground camouflage in Darien Lakes State Park

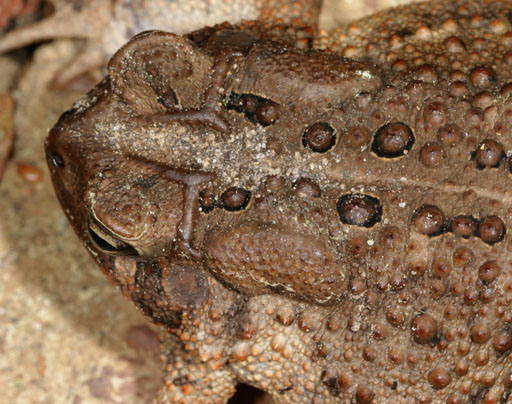
Detail of parotoid glands

The eastern American toad (A. a. americanus) is a medium-sized toad usually ranging in size from 5–9 cm (2.0–3.5 in); the record length for an eastern American toad is 11.1 cm (4.4 in). The color and pattern is somewhat variable, especially for the females. Skin color can change depending on habitat colors, humidity, stress, and temperature. Color changes range from yellow to brown to black, from solid colors to speckled. Their breeding habits are very similar to Anaxyrus fowleri. The call or voice of a breeding male is a high trill that lasts between 6–30 seconds and sounds similar to a ringing telephone. Males call for an average of 6-7 nights during their breeding period. Females show preference for call efforts (rate × duration), but not call frequency. They hibernate during the winter. The eastern American toad has spots that contain only one to two warts. It also has enlarged warts on the tibia or lower leg below the knee. While the belly is usually spotted, in some areas many are, and it is generally more so on the forward half (in some rare individuals there may be few or no spots). This subspecies of the American toad has no or very little markings on it. The spades on the back legs are blackish. Some toads of this subspecies have a more pervasive red and deep brown color, many with red warts on their bodies. Eastern American toads also have parotoid glands that are the same color as the surrounding skin. Parotoid length (mm) and width (mm) have a positive linear relationship with size, with females having slightly longer and wider parotoid glands compared to males. The glands don't usually have any patterning on them.

Other species that may be confused with the eastern American toad are Fowler's toad, which has three or more warts in the largest dark spots, and in the far west of its range woodhouse's toad. Fowler's toad can be especially difficult to identify in comparison to the eastern American toad but one difference is that it never has a spotted belly and both cranial crests touch the parotoid glands. Also, Fowler's toads are very fast hoppers (bursts of 5–10 fast hops) in comparison to Eastern toads’s lethargic, casual hopping and walking locomotion. In the eastern American toad these crests almost never touch the parotoid glands, which secrete bufotoxin, a poisonous substance meant to make the toad unpalatable to potential predators. Bufotoxin is a mild poison in comparison to that of other poisonous toads and frogs, but it can irritate human eyes and mucous membranes and is dangerous to smaller animals (such as dogs) when ingested.

American toads require a semi-permanent freshwater pond or pool with shallow water in which to breed, to gather their water supplies in times of drought or as a routine, and for their early development. They also require dense patches of vegetation, for cover and hunting grounds. Given these two things and a supply of insects for food, American toads can live almost everywhere, ranging from forests to flat grassland. Females when caught are silent and easily tamed, adapting to terrarium life readily, while the smaller males are readily communicative. The smaller males do not adapt well to terrarium life and should be released after a few days of observation. Adult toads are mostly nocturnal, although juveniles are often active during the day. When it rains, these toads will become active and can be observed eating worms and insects. These toads are 'creatures of habit', and once they have a certain area they prefer to live within an acre of wooded forest with water in proximity for soaking, a home with cool ledges and window wells; they commonly seek cover in burrows, under boardwalks, flat stones, boards, logs, wood piles, or other cover. When cold weather comes, these toads dig backwards and bury themselves in the dirt of their summer homes, or they may choose another site in which to hibernate. Their diet includes crickets, mealworms, earthworms, ants, spiders, slugs, centipedes, moths, and other small invertebrates. Some of these toads have been known to live over 30 years and currently a female specimen (over 13 centimeters long) is living healthily into her late 30s. Another female toad of 17 centimeters is known to have existed in Wisconsin from Washington Island on Lake Michigan.

The eastern American toad may be confused with the Canadian toad in the area where they overlap, but the cranial crests in the American toad do not join to form a raised "boss" (bump) like they do in the Canadian toad. Its range also overlaps with the southern toad's, but in this species the cranial crests form two unique knobs.

=== Dwarf American toad ===
The dwarf American toad (A. a. charlesmithi), is a smaller version of the American toad, which reaches lengths of about 6 cm (2 1/4 in), is generally a dark reddish color ranging to light red in some specimens in isolated populations. The spots on the back are reduced or absent, and when present they contain a few small red warts and a black ring around it like in the normal American toad. The warts are always darker than the skin of the toad. Some specimens have a white dorsal line in the middle of their backs. The ventral surface or belly is usually cream colored with a few dark spots in the breast area. This subspecies can be distinguished from the above-mentioned species in the same manner as for the eastern American toad. The southwestern portion of the Dwarf American toad's range overlaps with that of the Gulf Coast toad. The latter species is distinguished by the presence of a dark lateral stripe as well as a deep "valley" between its prominent cranial crests. It eats mainly spiders, worms and small insects.

=== Hudson Bay toad ===
The Hudson Bay toad (A. a. copei) is a rare Canadian subspecies of A. americanus. This subspecies of the American toad has been seen in the northern parts of Ontario where there are a few isolated populations. These northern dwarf toads mostly have the red coloring on the sides of their bodies and have an unusually high number of warts for the subspecies. Interbreeding with eastern American toads caused this subspecies to lose the red coloring on their backs.

== Inbreeding avoidance ==
Toads display breeding site fidelity, as do many other amphibians. Individuals that return to natal ponds to breed will likely encounter siblings as potential mates. Although incest is possible, Anaxyrus americanus siblings rarely mate. These toads likely recognize and actively avoid close kins as mates. Advertisement vocalizations by males appear to serve as cues by which females recognize their kin.

== Gallery ==
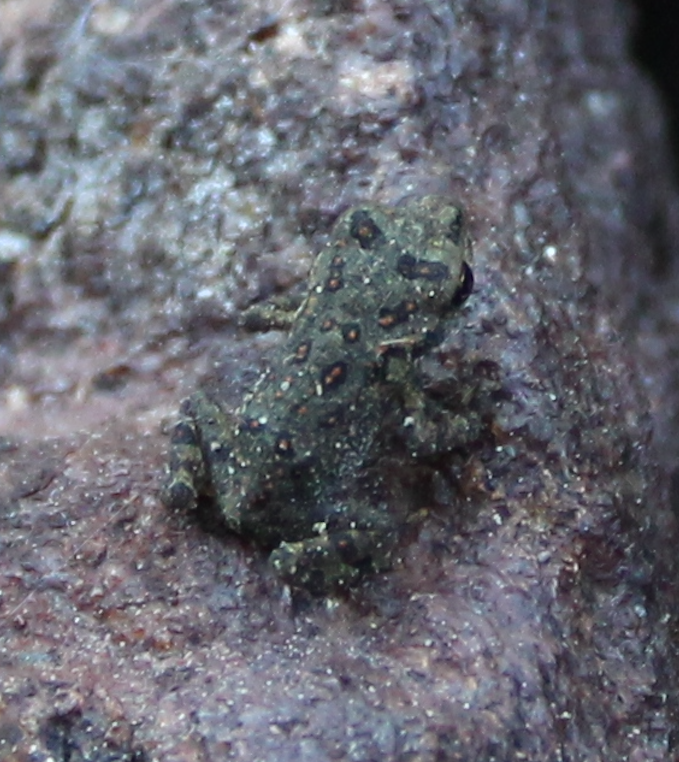
Newly metamorphosed American Toad (~5mm) at confluence of Keay Brook, Berwick, ME and the Salmon Falls River.

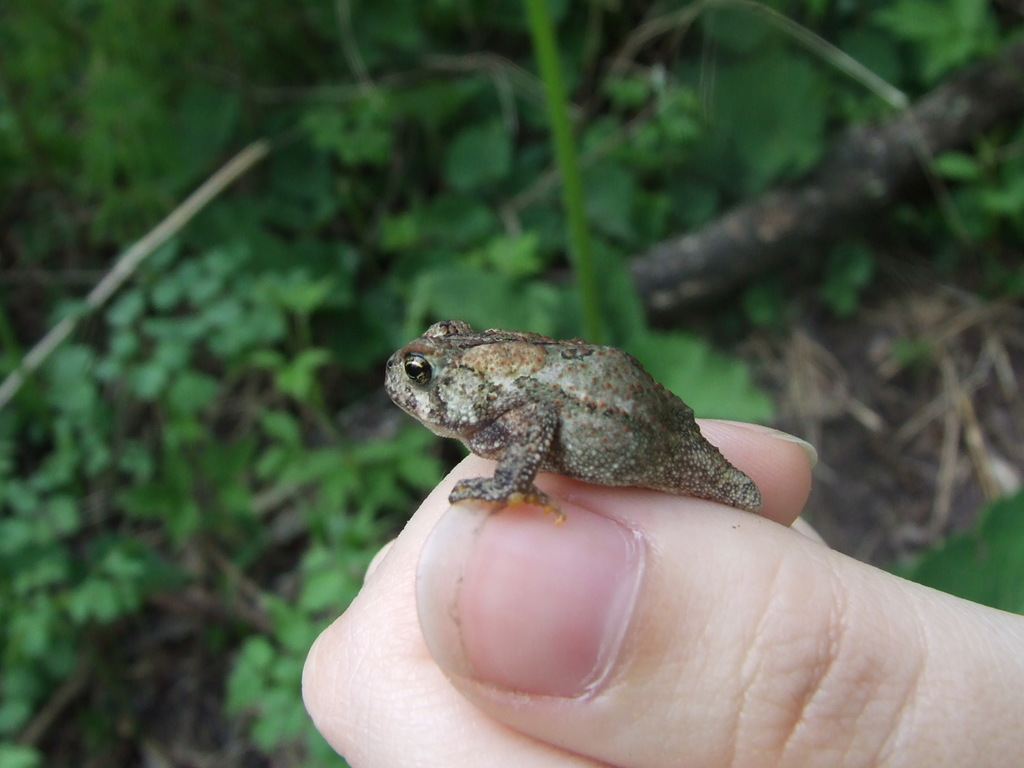
Approximately one week into adult cycle, shown in comparison to an adult female human hand

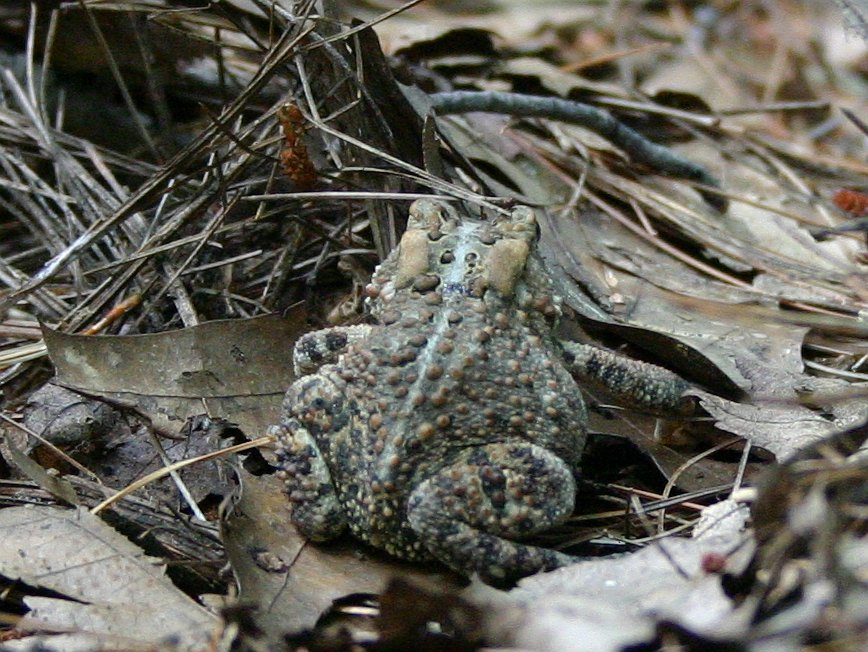
Eastern American toad, seen from behind, shows characteristic markings and "warts"

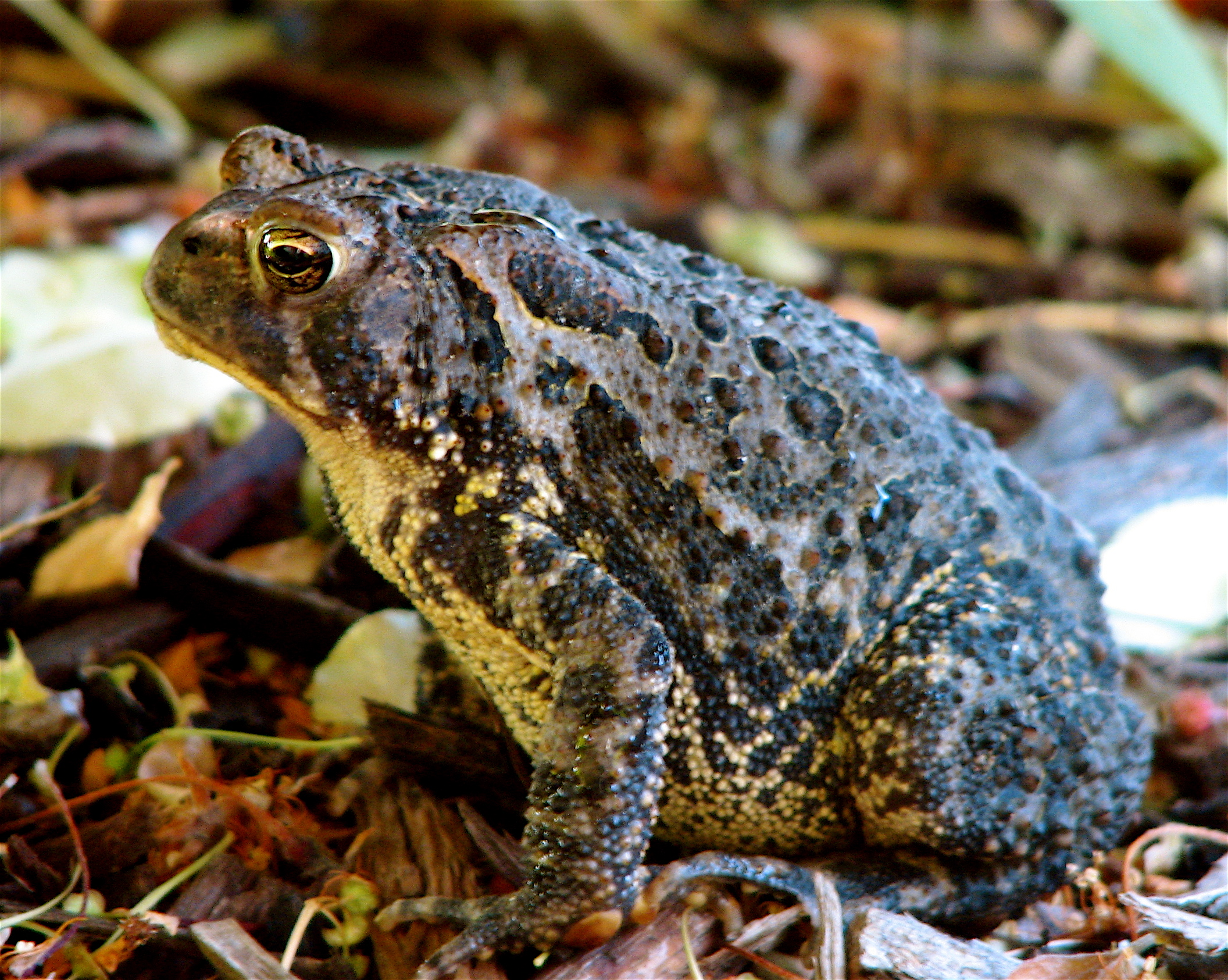
Closeup of the Eastern American toad

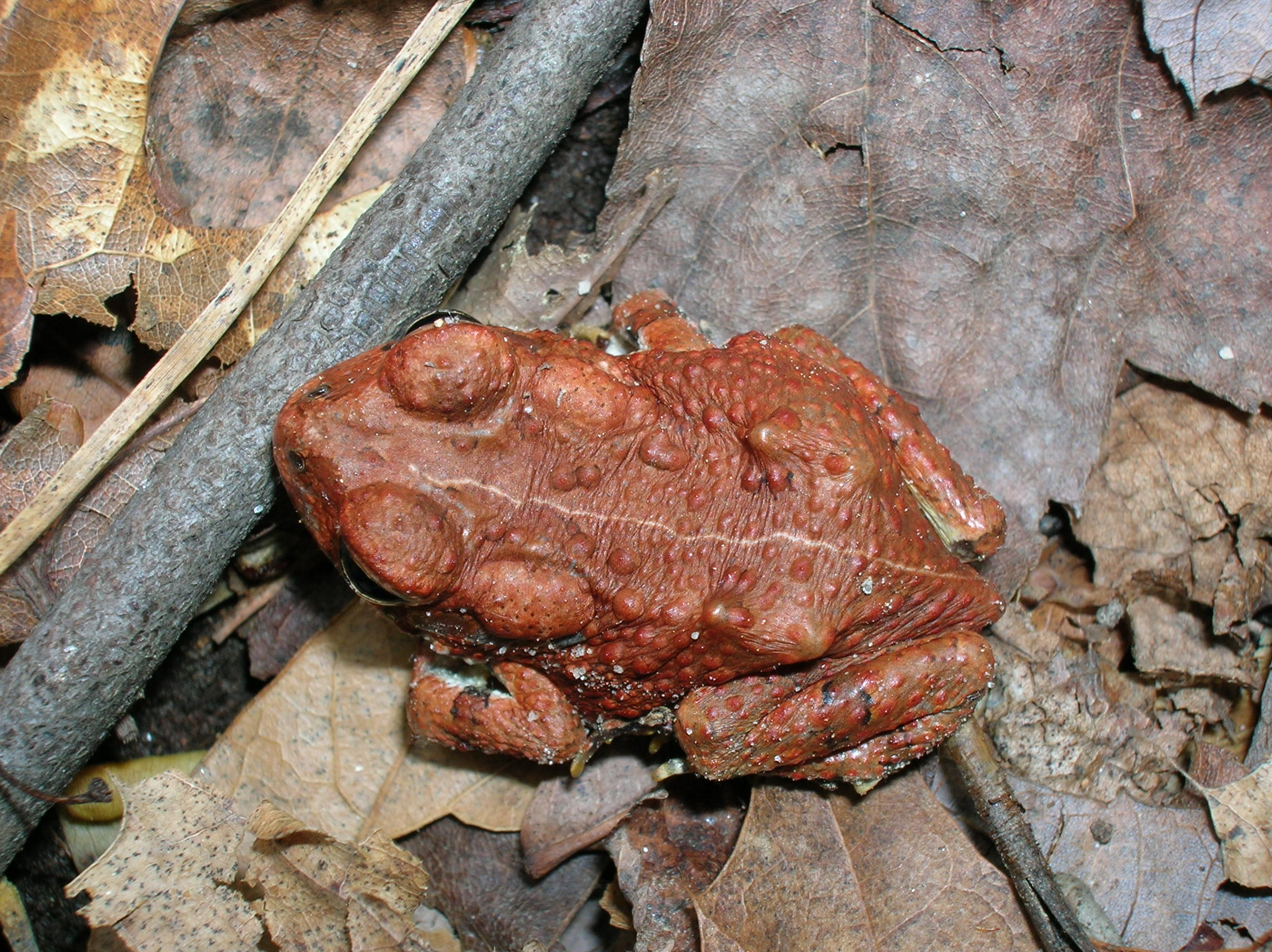
Young American toad

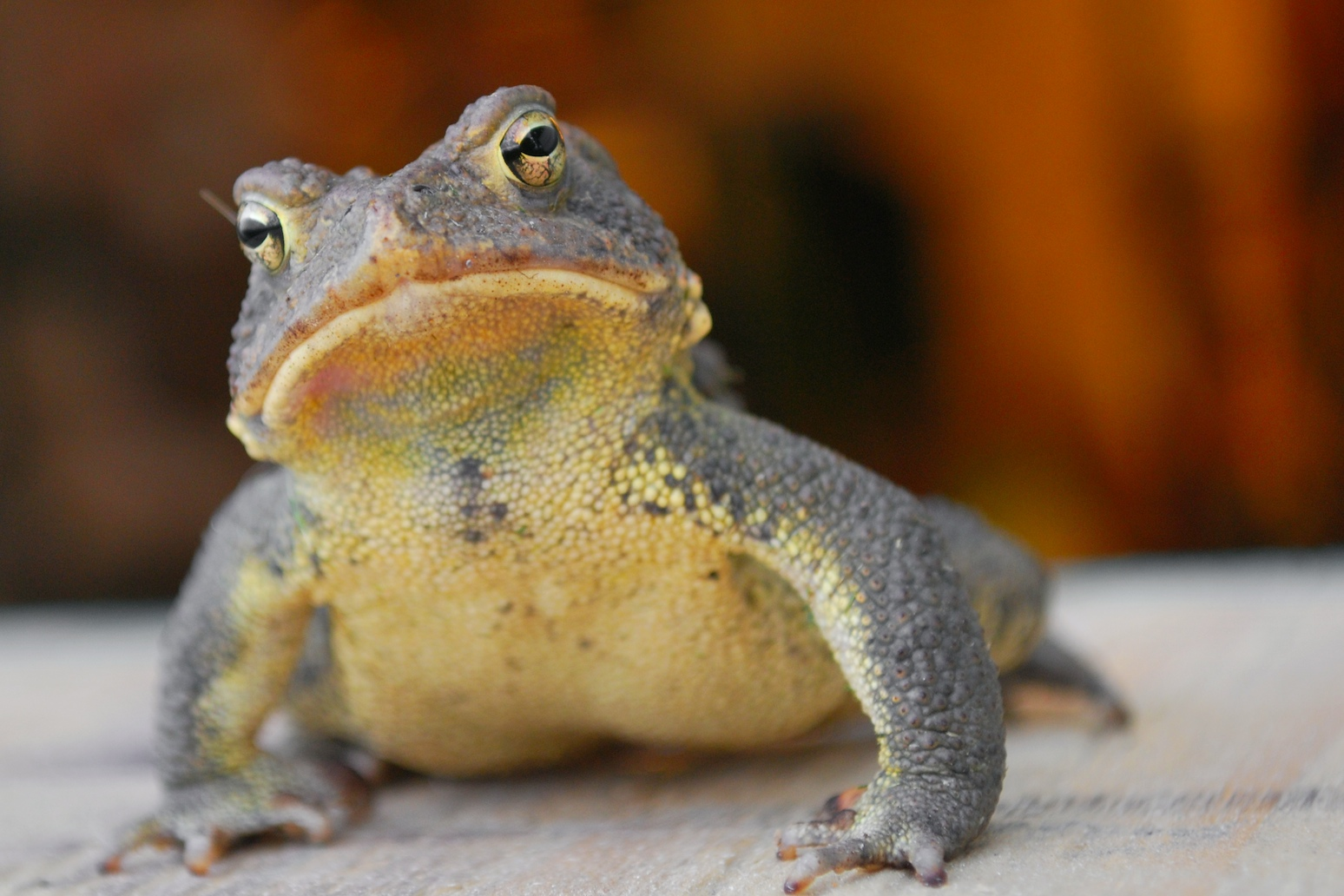
Front view of Eastern American toad

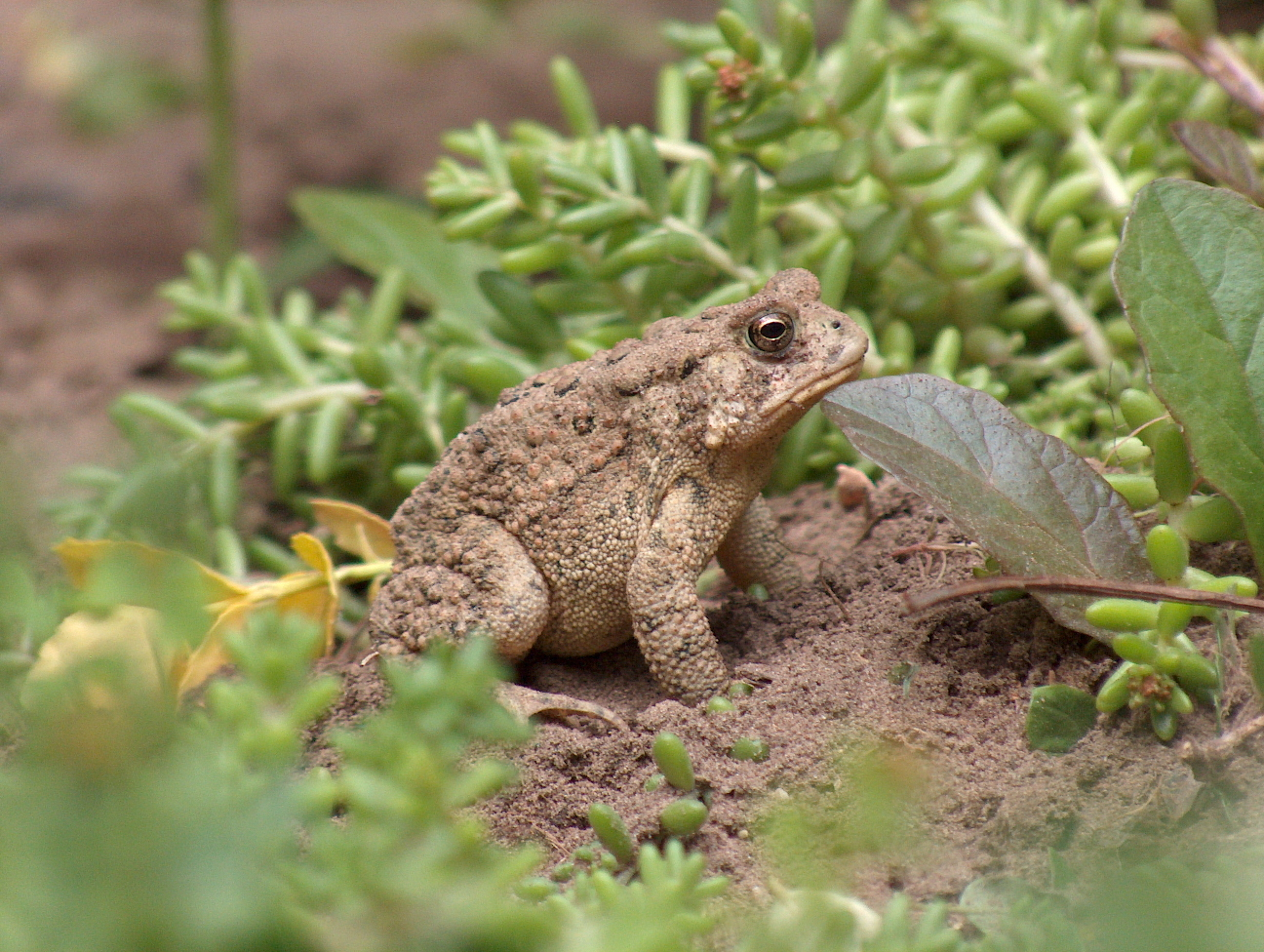
Side view of camouflaged A. americanus

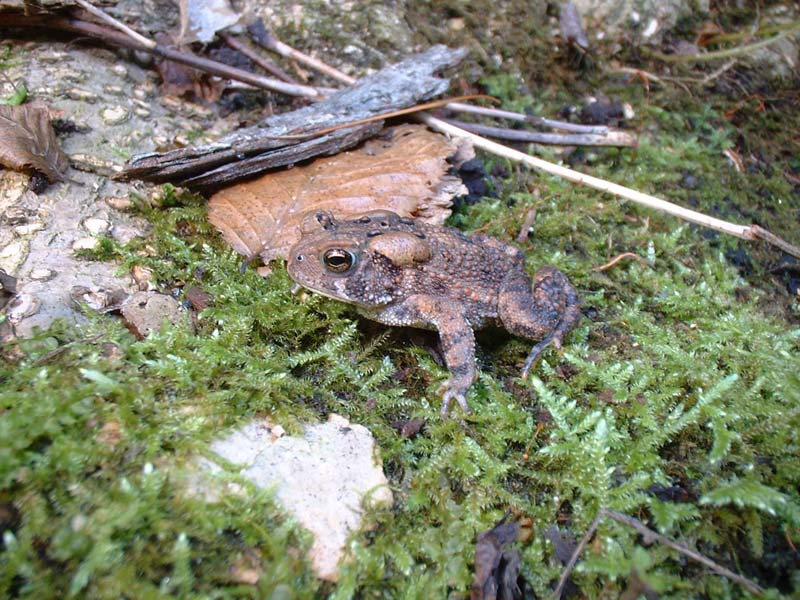
Eastern American toad (A. a. americanus), North Dumfries, Ontario

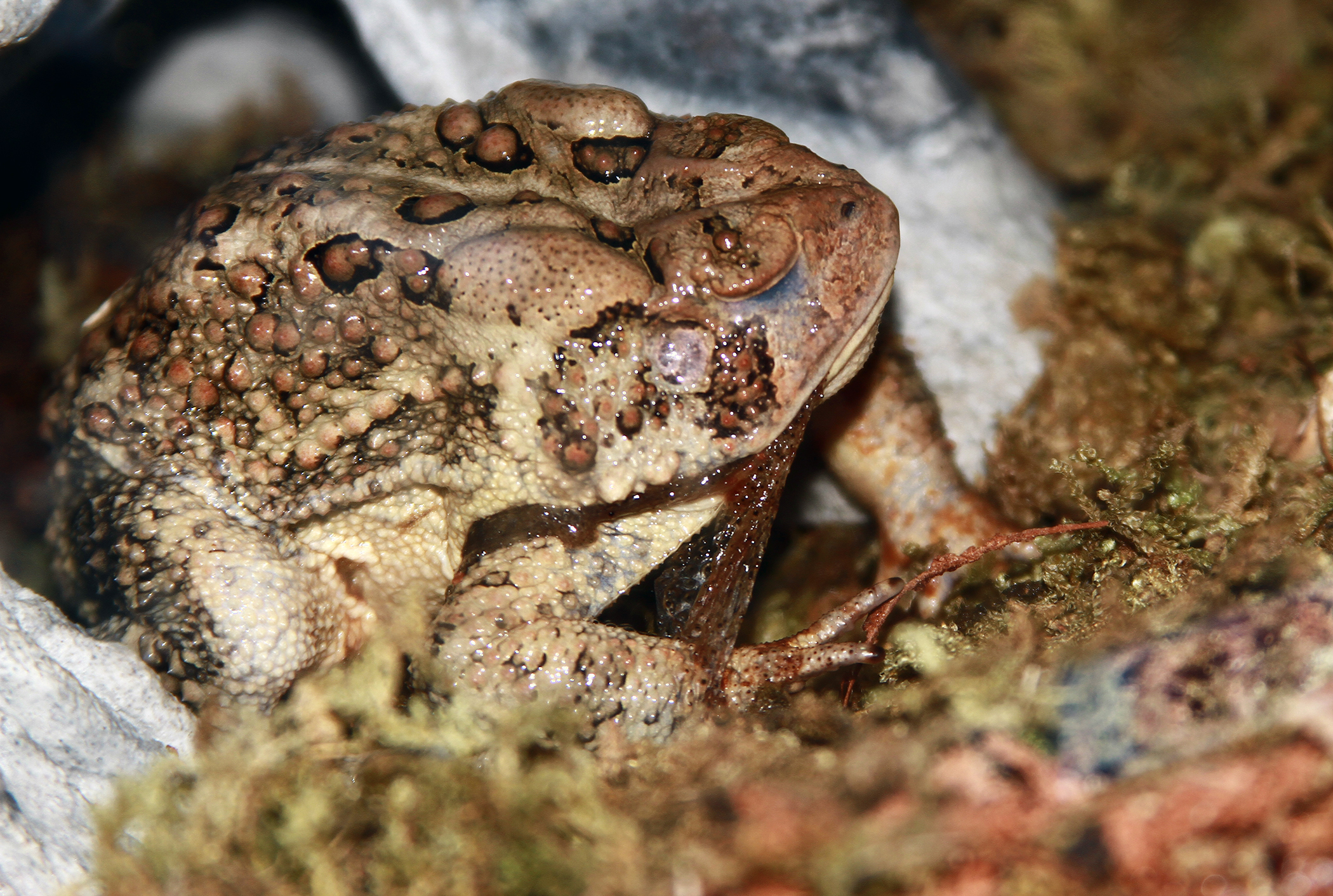
American toad eating its skin as it sheds

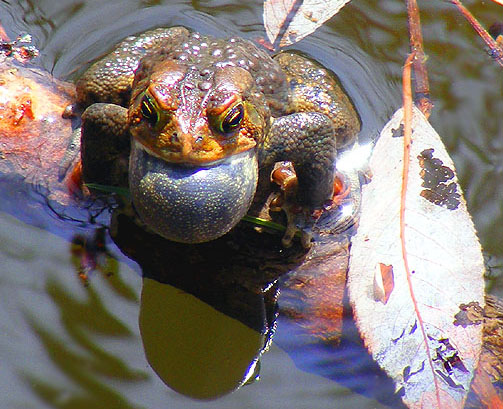
American toad chirp - mating call

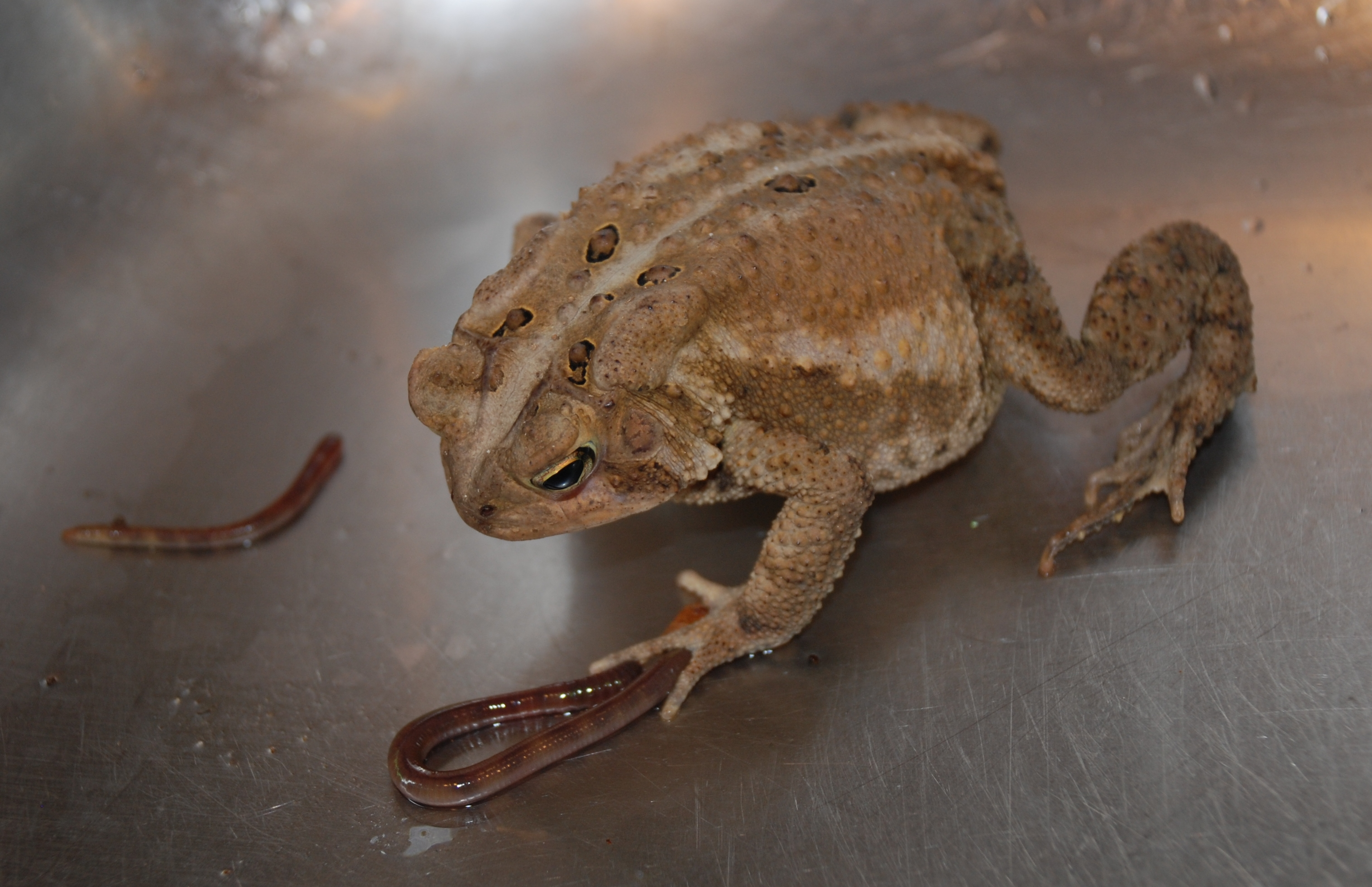
American toad feeding time

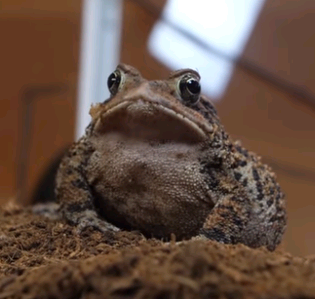
5 year old female American toad.

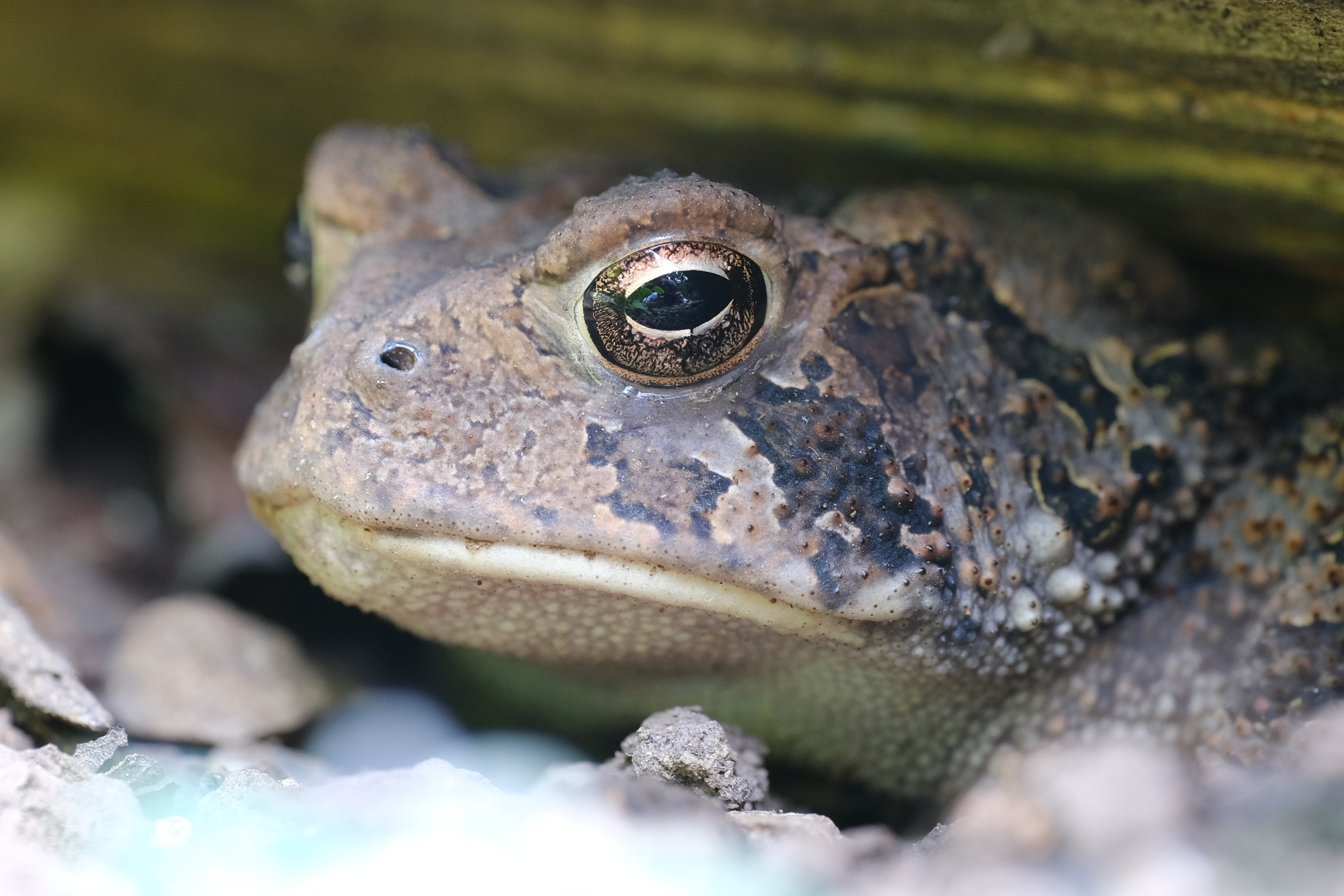
A closeup of an Eastern American toad seen in Tennessee.

American Toad eggs in shallow water

== See also ==
- European toad
- European green toad
- Japanese toad
