= Epic (2013 film) =

2013 animated film by Blue Sky Studios

- Theatrical release poster
- Directed by: Chris Wedge
- Screenplay by: James V. Hart; William Joyce; Daniel Shere; Tom J. Astle; Matt Ember
- Story by: William Joyce; James V. Hart; Chris Wedge
- Based on: The Leaf Men and the Brave Good Bugs by William Joyce
- Produced by: Lori Forte; Jerry Davis
- Starring: Colin Farrell; Josh Hutcherson; Amanda Seyfried; Christoph Waltz; Aziz Ansari; Chris O'Dowd; Pitbull; Jason Sudeikis; Steven Tyler; Beyoncé Knowles
- Cinematography: Renato Falcão
- Edited by: Andy Keir
- Music by: Danny Elfman
- Production companies: 20th Century Fox Animation; Blue Sky Studios
- Distributed by: 20th Century Fox
- Release dates: May 16, 2013 (International); May 18, 2013 (Ziegfeld Theatre); May 24, 2013 (United States)
- Running time: 102 minutes
- Country: United States
- Language: English
- Budget: $93 million
- Box office: $268.4 million

Epic (stylized in all-lower case) is a 2013 American animated fantasy action-adventure film directed by Chris Wedge. Loosely based on William Joyce's 1996 children's book The Leaf Men and the Brave Good Bugs, it was produced by 20th Century Fox Animation and Blue Sky Studios, and stars Colin Farrell, Josh Hutcherson, Amanda Seyfried, Christoph Waltz, Aziz Ansari, Chris O'Dowd, Pitbull, Jason Sudeikis, Steven Tyler, and Beyoncé Knowles. The story sees a teenager named M.K. (Seyfried) who gets shrunk and involved with a tiny woodland kingdom—mainly with the soldiers called the Leafmen—in their war against an evil army aiming to spread rot across the land.

Epic was internationally released on May 16, 2013, and in the United States on May 24, by 20th Century Fox, following in its premiere on Ziegfeld Theatre on May 18. The film received mixed-to-positive reviews from critics and was a box-office success, grossing $268 million against its $93 million budget.

== Plot ==
After her mother dies, 17-year-old Mary Katherine ("M.K.") moves in with her eccentric scientist father Professor Bomba in Danbury, Connecticut. Bomba spent his life researching the Leafmen, tiny humanoid soldiers who protect the neighboring forest from wicked creatures called Boggans. M.K. is irritated by her father's work, believing his theories to be nonsense. Meanwhile, Nod, an independent yet rebellious young Leafman, decides to quit, much to the ire of his no-nonsense leader Ronin, who promised Nod's late father he would look out for him.

The forest's benevolent ruler, Queen Tara, must choose her successor and arrives at a pool of lily pods, occupied by Mub, a laid-back slug and Grub, a wannabe Leafman snail. Immediately after she chooses a pod, the Boggans attack and overwhelm the Leafmen, while Tara flees with Ronin on his hummingbird mount. The pair are pursued by the Boggans' leader Mandrake and his son Dagda, who is killed by Ronin, but it allows Mandrake to badly wound Tara with an arrow.

M.K. decides to leave after getting into an argument with Bomba about his research. Outside, M.K. encounters the falling Tara, who entrusts the pod to her, shrinks her with magic, and tells her to take it to Nim Galuu, a glowworm wizard, before finally dying. M.K. is accompanied by Ronin, Mub, and Grub, while Ronin recruits a reluctant Nod after saving him from short-tempered toad gangster Bufo.

Ronin, Nod, M.K., Mub, and Grub meet Nim Galuu, who informs them that the pod must bloom that night, while exposed to the light of the full moon. When Ronin leaves, Nod takes M.K. on a deer ride and they begin to fall for each other. Thirsty for revenge for his son's death, Mandrake interrogates Bufo for the pod's location. Mandrake goes to Nim Galuu's place, where he learns that if the pod blooms in darkness, it will birth a dark prince who will help Mandrake destroy the forest. He takes the pod and kidnaps Mub and Grub. Ronin scolds Nod for not being there to protect the pod.

To get into Boggan territory undiscovered, M.K., Nod, and Ronin enter Bomba's house to get some disguises. There, M.K. learns that the Leafmen have deliberately been leading Bomba off their trail the whole time. Bomba spies them and captures M.K., but faints when he sees her. M.K. marks the location of Moonhaven on a map of the forest before rejoining Nod and Ronin. Upon reaching Boggan territory, Ronin causes a distraction while M.K. and Nod rescue Mub, Grub, and the pod. An outnumbered Ronin sacrifices himself to ensure the others escape.

Before the full moon can open the pod at Moonhaven, Mandrake's bats block the light, causing the pod to begin blooming in darkness. While the Leafmen set out to fight the Boggans, M.K. tries to get her father's attention by using the various cameras he had set in the forest. However, upon regaining consciousness, Bomba concludes that he has been insane all these years and begins scrapping his research, but he changes his mind when he sees the red push-pin that M.K. had put on his map.

Bomba is overjoyed to see that he has been right and follows M.K. to Moonhaven. M.K. uses the bat sounds on Bomba's iPod to lure Mandrake's bats away. Meanwhile, Mub and Nim Galuu try to stop Mandrake from reaching the pod, but are unsuccessful. Just then, Ronin reappears, having survived the attack. He is outdone by Mandrake, but Nod, who finally realizes the importance of teamwork, comes to his aid. Before Mandrake can obtain his victory, the pod fully blooms in moonlight, as Mandrake is consumed by the burl of a nearby tree.

A flower child who earlier aided in Tara's escape is made the new queen. Grub becomes a Leafman, Nod and Ronin reconcile, and Nod and M.K. share a kiss before M.K. is returned to her original size. M.K. reunites with Bomba and later becomes his assistant; the two of them remain in contact with their small friends as they continue the research of their world.

== Voice cast ==
- Colin Farrell as Ronin, a seasoned Leafman warrior, leader of the Leafmen, Nod's guardian and teacher, and a friend of Nod's late father.
- Josh Hutcherson as Nod, a rookie Leafman warrior, Ronin's student, and Mary Katherine's love interest.
- Amanda Seyfried as Mary Katherine "M.K." Bomba, Professor Bomba's daughter. She is named after William Joyce's late daughter.
- Christoph Waltz as Mandrake, the cruel and snide owner of the Boggans. Waltz also voiced Mandrake in the German dub of the film.
- Jason Sudeikis as Professor Radcliffe Bomba, M.K.'s father and a scientist.
- Beyoncé Knowles as Queen Tara, the Mother Nature-like queen of the forest and Ronin's childhood love.
- Aziz Ansari as Mub, a slug, Grub's best friend and caretaker of the pods.
- Chris O'Dowd as Grub, a snail, Mub's best friend and fellow caretaker of the pods.
- Steven Tyler as Nim Galuu, a Glowworm, a showman and keeper of magic scrolls that tell what has occurred during the times, in a tree.
- Pitbull as Bufo, a toad who works as a race fixer and a businessman.
- Blake Anderson as Dagda, Mandrake's son and the Boggans' general officer. After his death, Mandrake is intent on destroying the forest.
- Thomas F. Wilson as Finn, second-in-command of the Leafmen. His name only appears in the closing credits.
- Judah Friedlander as Larry, a taxi driver.
- John DiMaggio as Pinecone Jinn.
- Rosa Salazar as Roller Derby Girl.
- Kyle Kinane as Biker Dude.
- Emma Kenney as Marigold Girl.

== Production ==
In 2006, it was reported that Chris Wedge would be directing an animated feature film based on William Joyce's book, The Leaf Men and the Brave Good Bugs for Fox Animation. Joyce, who had already collaborated with Wedge as a designer and producer on the 2005 film Robots, was set to produce the film. At one point, Wedge got permission to find a new home for the film and turned to Pixar, led by John Lasseter, a close friend that Wedge knew from working on Tron. When Pixar tried to close the rights for the film and start development, which would have been its first film adaptation of an existing work and a departure from its penchant of basing all of its films on original ideas, Fox changed their mind, and the film returned to Fox. The film was officially greenlit in 2009, under the title Leaf Men. In May 2012, Fox announced the final title for the film (Epic), its first cast details, and a plot. According to Wedge, he was unsatisfied with the renaming, which was decided by the marketing department. He also expressed dissatisfaction with subtitles given to the film in some non-English countries, including the French subtitle, The Battle of the Secret Kingdom.

Although the film is based on and borrows many characters from Joyce's book, its plot has been significantly changed. Wedge explained: "[W]hile Bill wrote a wonderful book, it is a quaint story. We wanted to make a gigantic action-adventure movie." To address online speculations about whether the film is similar to other films, like FernGully: The Last Rainforest or Avatar, Wedge said: "I hate to associate it with other movies. It is adventure on the scale of Star Wars. And it does immerse the audience completely in a world like Avatar. But it has its own personality."

== Soundtrack ==
Epic: Original Motion Picture Soundtrack

Film score by Danny Elfman
- Released: May 21, 2013
- Recorded: 2013
- Genre: Score
- Length: 52:25
- Label: Sony Classics

Danny Elfman film scores chronology
Oz the Great and Powerful (2013)	Epic: Original Motion Picture Soundtrack (2013)	American Hustle (2013)

Danny Elfman, who previously worked on another William Joyce film adaptation Meet the Robinsons, composed the original music for the film, which was released on May 21, 2013, by Sony Classics. Beyoncé performed and co-wrote with Sia an original song, titled "Rise Up." The song was released as a digital single and as part of the digital version of the soundtrack. That was the first time that a film produced by Blue Sky Studios had not been scored by John Powell since the first Ice Age installment in 2002, which was composed by David Newman.

== Release ==
The film was internationally released starting with May 16, 2013. In the United States, it premiered on May 18, 2013, at the Ziegfeld Theatre in New York City, and was theatrically released on May 24, 2013.

=== Home media ===
Epic was released on DVD, Blu-ray and Blu-ray 3D on August 20, 2013. On January 29, 2021, Epic was made available to Disney+ subscribers, following The Walt Disney Company's acquisition of both 20th Century Fox and Blue Sky Studios in 2019, but it later got removed from the service on May 1, 2021, due to pre-existing contracts. It was later added again as part of the Hulu hub.

== Reception ==
=== Box office ===
Produced on a budget of $93 million, Epic grossed $107.5 million in North America, and $160.9 million in other countries, for a worldwide total of $268.4 million. In North America, the film earned $9.3 million on its opening day, and opened to number four in its first weekend, with $33.5 million and $42.8 million over the four day Memorial Weekend (Friday–Monday), behind Fast & Furious 6, The Hangover Part III, and Star Trek Into Darkness. In its second weekend, the film dropped to number five, grossing an additional $16.6 million. In its third weekend, the film stayed at number five, grossing $11.9 million. In its fourth weekend, the film dropped to number seven, grossing $6.3 million. While the film was overshadowed by other animated films that summer including Monsters University and Despicable Me 2, the film finished in third out of six family films that summer, and became a moderate box office success.

=== Critical reception ===
On the review aggregator website Rotten Tomatoes, 65% of 124 critics' reviews are positive, with an average rating of 5.8/10. The website's consensus reads: "Though its narrative themes are all too familiar, Epic is beautifully animated and crafted with just enough flair to make for solid family entertainment." Another review aggregation website, Metacritic, which assigns a normalized rating out of 100 top reviews from mainstream critics, calculated a score of 52 out of 100 based on 30 reviews, indicating "mixed or average" reviews. Audiences polled by CinemaScore gave the film an "A" grade on an A+-to-F scale, while specifically child audiences gave it an "A+" grade.

Stephan Lee of Entertainment Weekly gave the film a B+, saying "The story lacks the specialness of a Pixar movie—it retreads the same eco-battle archetypes as FernGully and Avatar—but it's a perfectly appealing explosion of color for a lazy summer day." Michael Rechtshaffen of The Hollywood Reporter gave the film a mixed review, saying "Where the animated film comes up short is on the inspiration front—despite the intriguing terrain, its stock inhabitants lack the sort of unique personality traits that would prevent them from feeling overly familiar." Michael Phillips of the Chicago Tribune gave the film two stars, saying "It's difficult to keep its story and characters, or even its visual design, in your mind's eye, in part because the five credited screenwriters overload the narrative with incident and threatening complication." Moira Macdonald of The Seattle Times gave the film three-and-a-half stars out of four, saying "The story's simple enough to appeal to young kids (the 8-year-old with me pronounced the movie "awesome"), but adults will enjoy the beautiful animation, whether 3D or 2D." Stephen Holden of The New York Times gave the film two-and-a-half stars out of five, saying "As beautiful as it is, Epic is fatally lacking in visceral momentum and dramatic edge."

=== Accolades ===
Awards
Award	Date of ceremony	Category	Recipients and nominees	Result
Annie Awards	February 1, 2014	Animated Effects in an Animated Production	Alen Lai, David Quirus, Diego Garzon Sanchez, and Ilan Gabai	Nominated
Annie Awards	February 1, 2014	Character Animation in an Animated Feature Production	Thom Roberts	Nominated
Annie Awards	February 1, 2014	Directing in an Animated Feature Production	Chris Wedge	Nominated
Annie Awards	February 1, 2014	Music in an Animated Feature Production	Danny Elfman	Nominated
Annie Awards	February 1, 2014	Production Design in an Animated Feature Production	Michael Knapp, Greg Couch, and William Joyce	Nominated
Black Reel Awards	2014	Outstanding Voice Performance	Beyoncé Knowles	Nominated
Casting Society of America Awards	November 18, 2013	Outstanding Achievement in Casting - Animation Feature	Christian Kaplan	Nominated
Motion Picture Sound Editors	February 16, 2014	Best Sound Editing in an Animated Feature Film	Randy Thom, Gwendolyn Yates Whittle	Won
Producers Guild of America Award	January 19, 2014	Outstanding Producer of Animated Theatrical Motion Picture	Jerry Davis, Lori Forte	Nominated
Satellite Awards	February 23, 2014	Best Motion Picture, Animated or Mixed Media		Nominated
Visual Effects Society Awards	February 12, 2014	Outstanding Animated Character in an Animated Feature Motion Picture	Bomba (Thom Roberts, Haven Gordon Cousins, Tim Bower, Daniel Lima)	Nominated
Visual Effects Society Awards	February 12, 2014	Outstanding Animated Character in an Animated Feature Motion Picture	Mary Katherine (Jeff Gabor, Dylan C. Maxwell, Sang Jun Lee, Chris Pagoria)	Nominated
Visual Effects Society Awards	February 12, 2014	Outstanding Created Environment in an Animated Feature Motion Picture	Pod Patch (Aaron Ross, Travis Price, Jake Panian, Antelmo Villarreal)	Nominated
Visual Effects Society Awards	February 12, 2014	Outstanding FX and Simulation Animation in an Animated Feature Motion Picture	Boggan Crowds (Thierry Dervieux-Lecocq, David Gatenby, Mark Adams, Matthew D. Simmons)	Nominated
World Soundtrack Academy	October 25, 2013	Film Composer of the Year	Danny Elfman also for Frankenweenie, Hitchcock, Oz the Great and Powerful, Promised Land, and Silver Linings Playbook	Nominated
