= CFP =

CFP may refer to:

== Businesses and organizations ==
- Canadian Future Party, political party in Canada
- Center for Freedom and Prosperity, CF&P, US tax reform advocacy
- Compagnie Française des Pétroles, the first incarnation of TotalEnergies
- Concentración de Fuerzas Populares, former political party in Ecuador

== Economics, finance, and law ==
- California Fully Protected Species, legal wildlife designation
- Canadian Firearms Program, regulatory body
- Certified Financial Planner, certification
- CFP franc, currency used in the French overseas possessions
- Common Fisheries Policy of EU

== Science and technology ==
- Canadian Family Physician, a peer-reviewed open-access medical journal published by the College of Family Physicians of Canada
- C form-factor pluggable, agreement for form-factor for digital signals
- Computers, Freedom, and Privacy, annual North American academic conference
- Complementary feedback pair, also known as a Sziklai pair
- Cyan fluorescent protein, a derivative of the green fluorescent protein
- Properdin, a protein encoded by the gene CFP

== Sports ==
- 25 metre center-fire pistol, a shooting sport
- College Football Playoff, annual college football tournament in the United States

== Other uses ==
- Call for papers, a method used in academic contexts for collecting articles of work
- Christian Focus Publications, British publishing house
- Community Facilities Program, a grant and loan program administered by the Rural Housing Service
