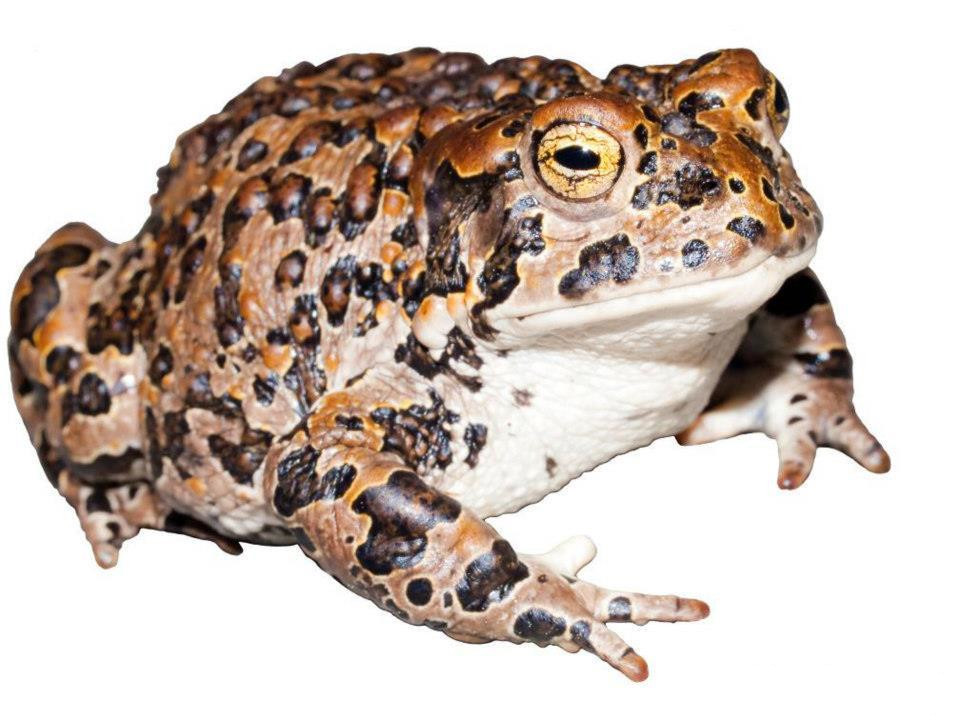
- Adult female in Kings Canyon

Conservation status
- Vulnerable (IUCN 3.1)

- Threatened (ESA)

Scientific classification
- Kingdom: Animalia
- Phylum: Chordata
- Class: Amphibia
- Order: Anura
- Family: Bufonidae
- Genus: Anaxyrus
- Species: A. canorus

Binomial name
- Anaxyrus canorus (Camp, 1916)
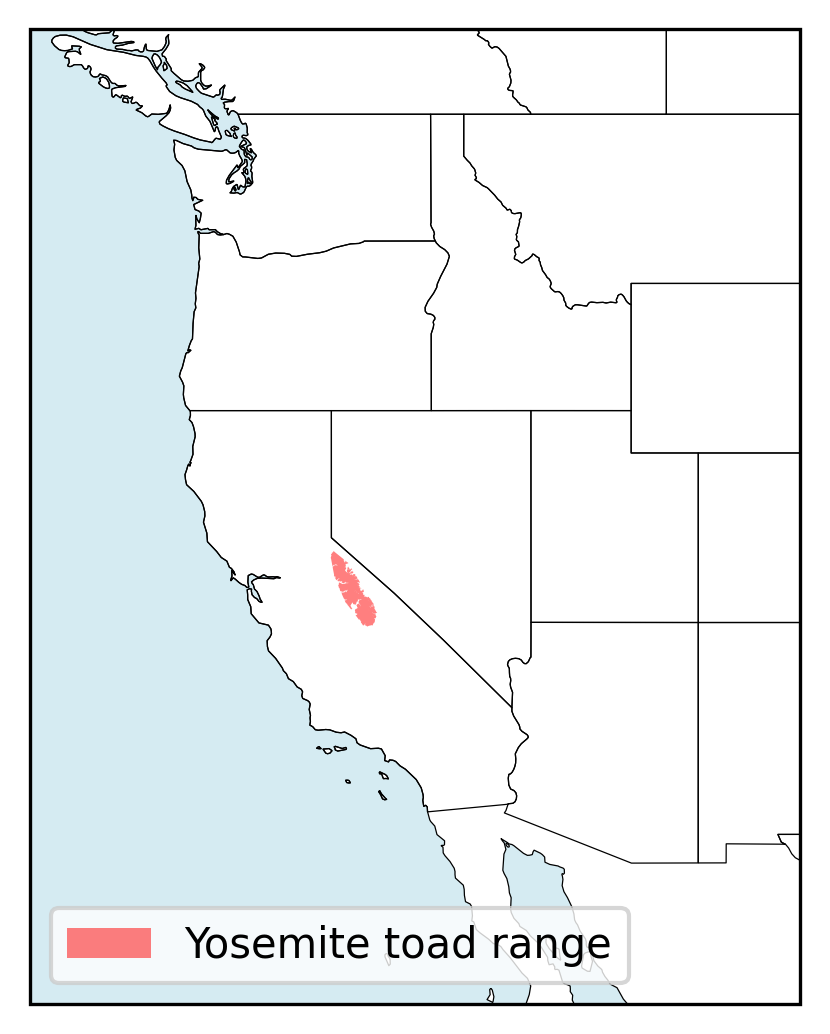

Synonyms
- Bufo canorus Camp, 1916

= Yosemite toad =

Species of amphibian

The Yosemite toad (Anaxyrus canorus, formerly Bufo canorus) is a species of true toad in the family Bufonidae. Endemic to the Sierra Nevada of California, the species ranges from the Alpine County to Fresno County. Yosemite toads are only found in the montane to subalpine elevational zone of 1,950–3,445 m (6,398–11,302 ft) asl. The Yosemite toad is similar to the nearby western toad (A. boreas), but in many ways adapted to a high elevation lifestyle. It was initially described during the Grinnell Survey of California, by an undergraduate student of Joseph Grinnell named Charles Camp.

== Description ==
=== Adults ===
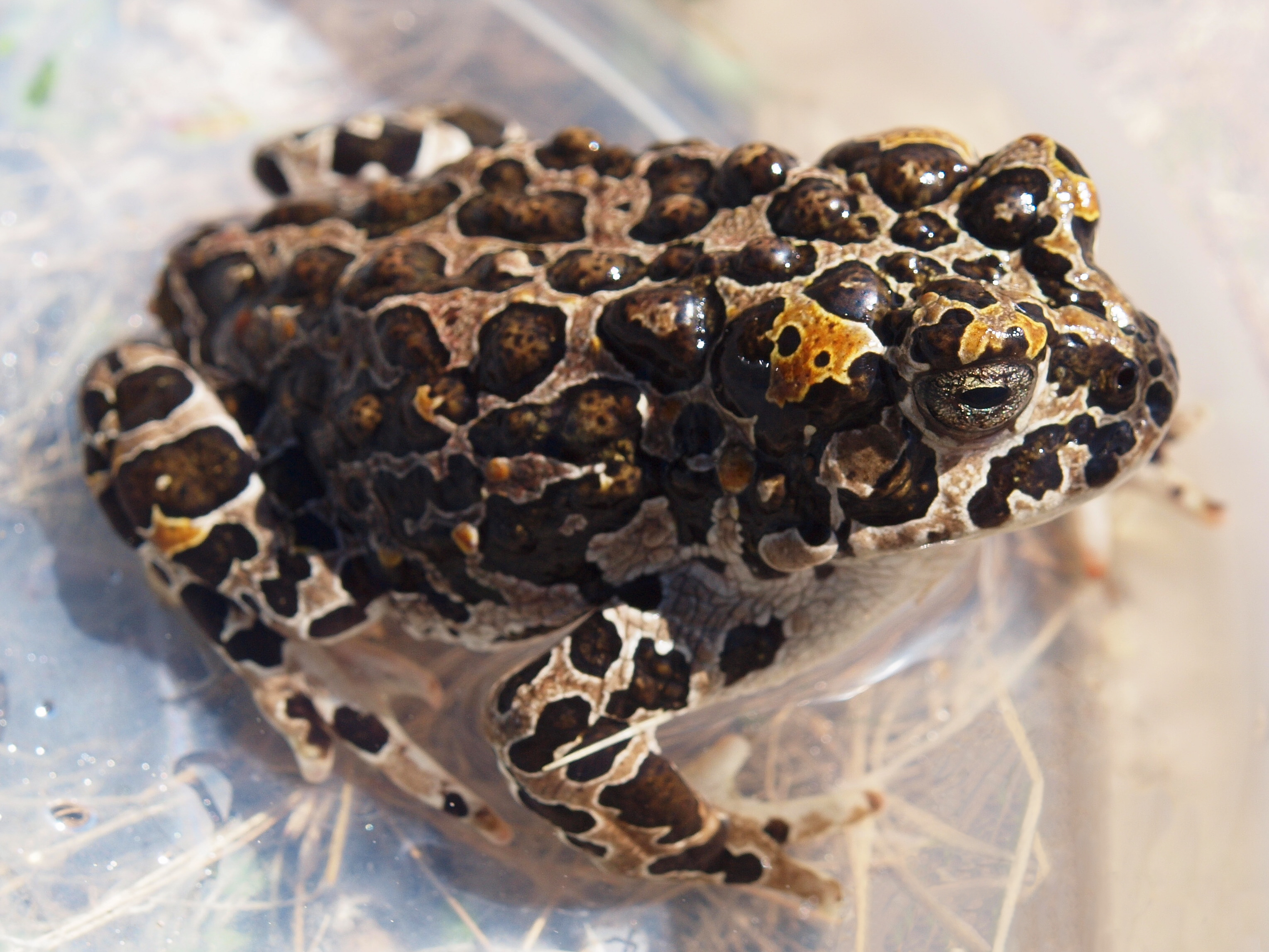
adult female

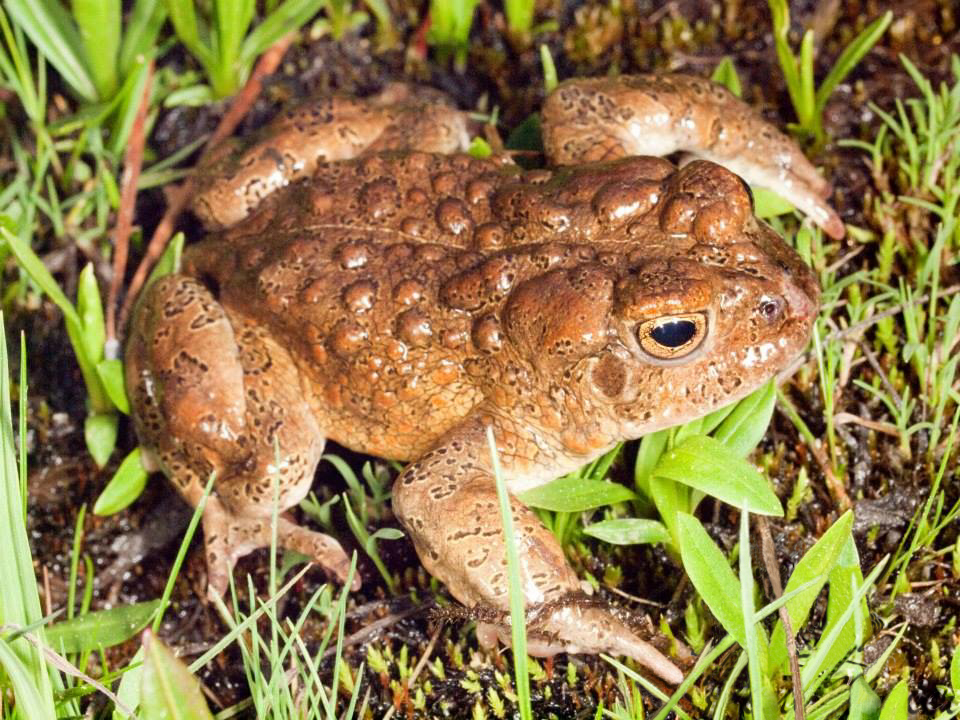
adult male

Yosemite toads are the most sexually dichromatic anuran in North America. Males and females are colored and patterned differently.

Yosemite toads are medium-sized (48–84 millimetres or 1.9–3.3 inches SVL) stocky toads, with females averaging larger than males. They generally lack cranial crests, but males will rarely have weakly developed ones. Their eyes have a dark brown iris with gold iridophores. In comparison with the closely related western toad (A. boreas), the parotoid glands are large, narrowly spaced, and irregularly shaped (oval or flattened), less than one gland width apart. Like the parotoids, the eyes are spaced narrowly apart, usually less than the width of the upper eyelid. The warts are large, smooth, and the dorsal skin between warts is smooth as compared to the western toad. It is the most sexually dichromatic species of anuran in North America, with males and females displaying strikingly divergent patterns and coloration at maturity. Females are dorsally covered in black blotches that have white or cream borders, with a tan, copper, or ruddy background; males are more uniformly colored, ranging from yellow-green, to olive drab, to greenish brown, sometimes with scattered black flecks near warts. Juveniles resemble adult females, except with a thin mid-dorsal stripe, which gradually fades during development (faster in males than females). A prominent mid-dorsal stripe is lacking in this species, unlike the western toad. As juvenile males mature, their black blotches shrink and ultimately disappear, whereas they expand and reticulate in developing females.

Unlike other members of the A. boreas species group (A. boreas, A. nelsoni, A. nestor [extinct], A. canorus, and A. exsul), Yosemite toad males have a vocal sac and produce an advertisement call to attract females during breeding. The call is a high-pitched, melodious, flute-like trill repeated frequently. Charles Camp chose the specific epithet "canorus" (meaning tuneful) for the species based on its advertisement call. The trill contains 26–51 evenly spaced notes that last an average of 2.6 seconds.

=== Eggs ===
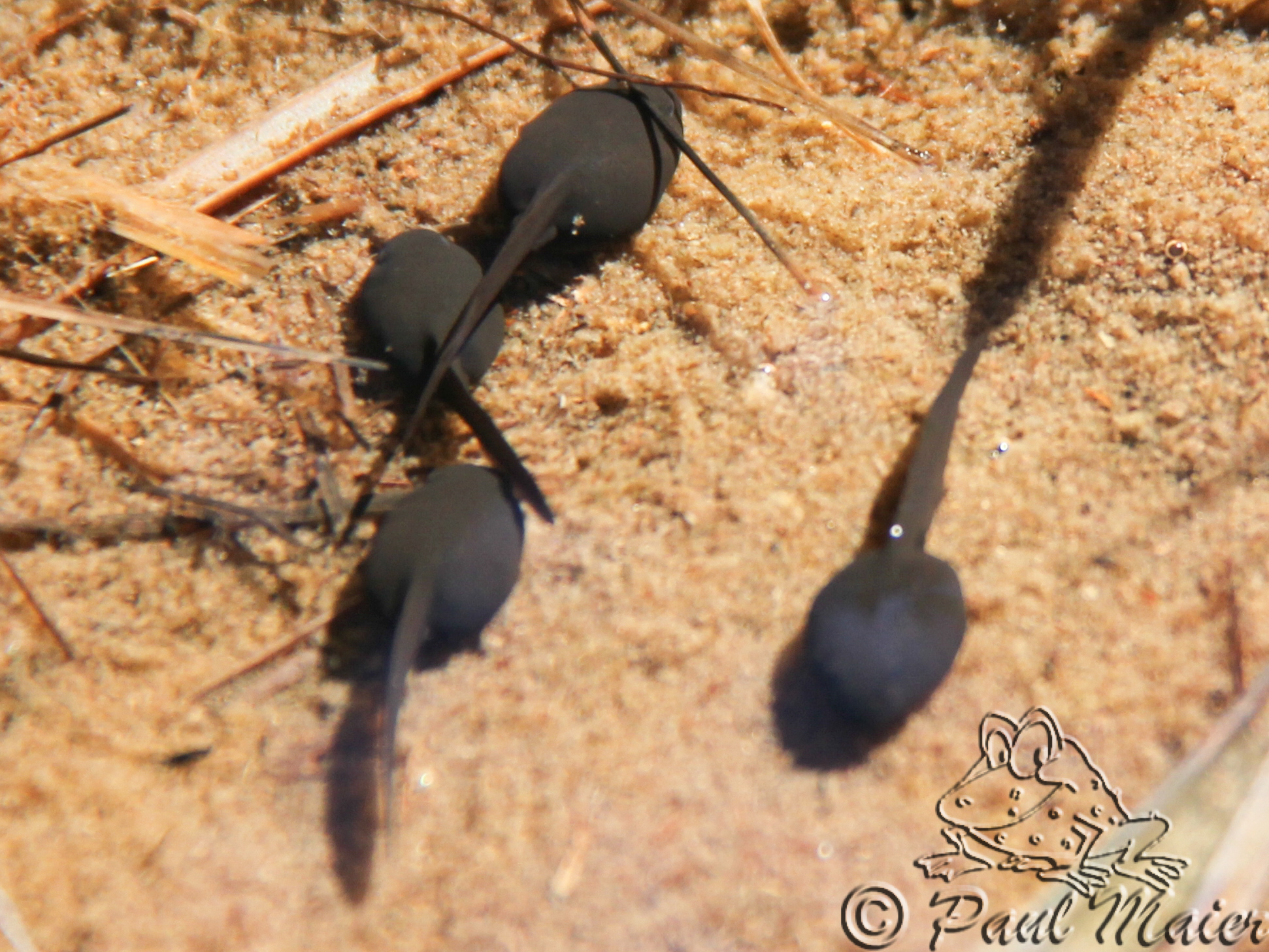
Yosemite toad tadpoles

Eggs are darkly pigmented and laid in 1 or 2 strands (1 per ovary, the oviducts fuse just before the cloaca in toads), however egg masses may fold during deposition into radiating clusters 4–5 eggs wide. 1000–2000 eggs beaded in two envelopes are laid by females in shallow pools, tangled in vegetation. Individual eggs are 2.1 mm wide on average, and 4.1 mm including the two envelopes.

=== Tadpoles ===
Tadpoles are 10–37 millimetres (0.39–1.46 in) TL and jet black throughout, and hence the intestines are not visible ventrally. Their eyes are set dorsally (in contrast to the co-occurring Sierra chorus frog, which has eyes on the outline of the head when viewed from above). In contrast to the western toad, the snout is shorter and blunted in lateral view, the tail fins are mostly opaque, the tail is deepest about halfway down its length, and the tail tip is more rounded. The labial tooth row formula is 2/3 (2 upper and 3 lower labial tooth rows), and the ratio of lengths of the last 2 rows is 1.6 (in western toads it is 1.2).

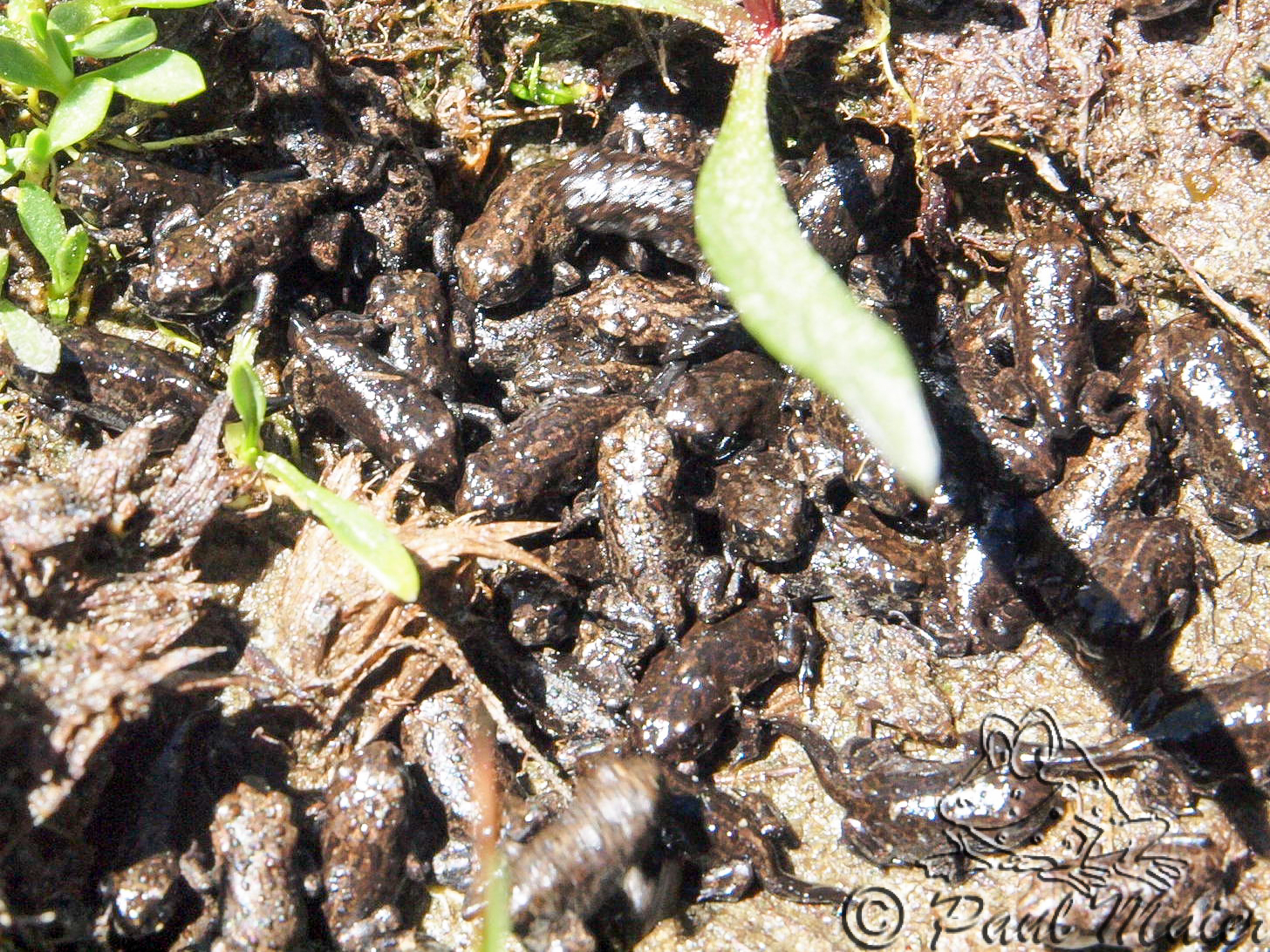
metamorphs

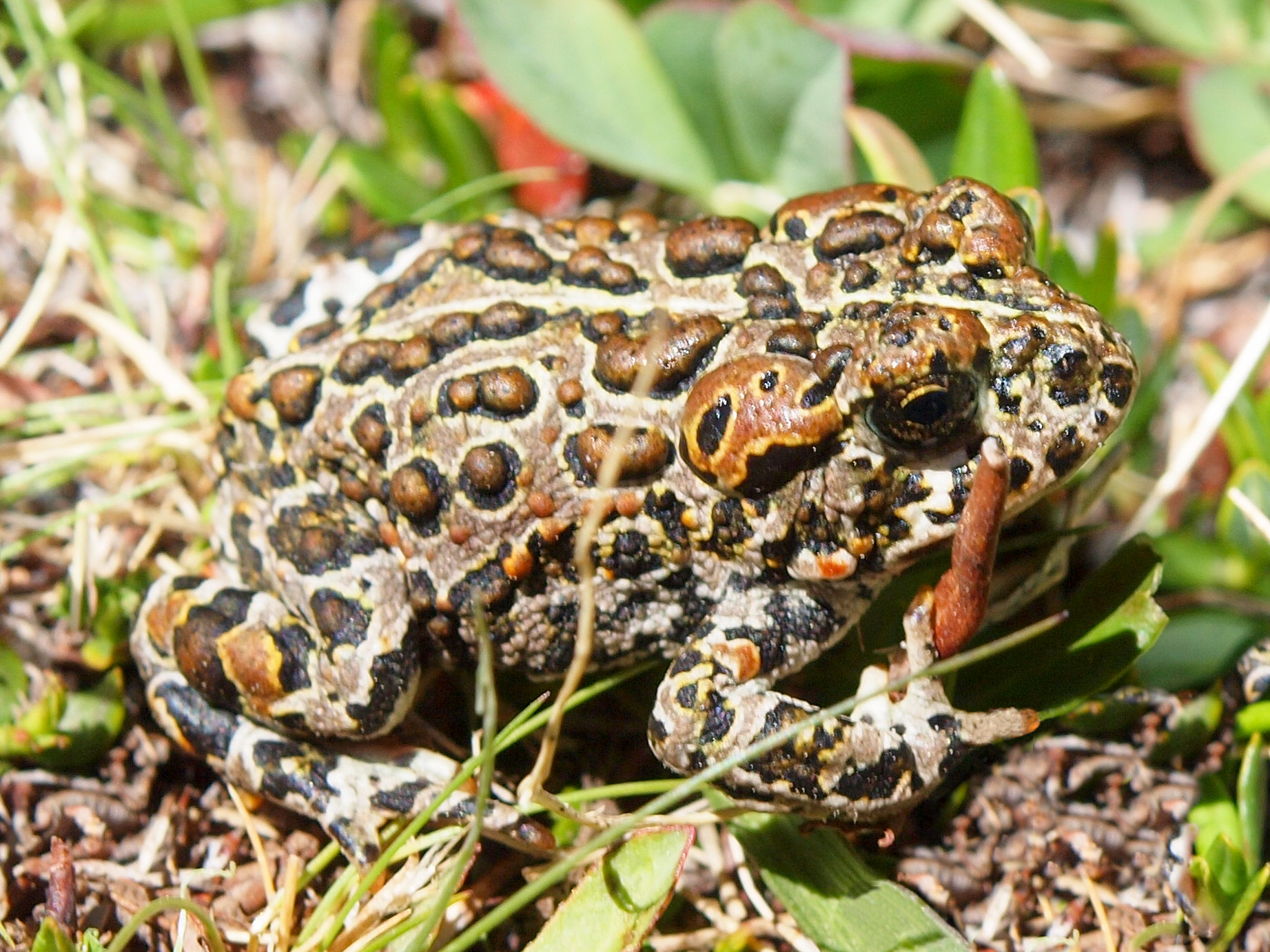
2-year-old juvenile

Subadult stages. Sexual maturity takes 3–6 years, depending on sex.

=== Subadults ===
Metamorphs (recently metamorphosed tadpoles) are highly pigmented like tadpoles, and quite small, usually 9–14 millimetres or 0.35–0.55 inches SVL. Juveniles (1+ years in age) reach sexual maturity after 3–5 years (males) or 4–6 years (females), at which time sex-specific colors and patterns emerge. Until then, juveniles resemble adult females: they have a background color varying from brown to grey with generally unconnected black blotches encircling the warts. Unlike adult females, juveniles have a thin mid-dorsal stripe that is white or cream-colored, and orange tubercles on the undersides of their hands and feet. As juveniles mature, their black blotches expand and interconnect if they are females, or shrink if they are males, and the mid-dorsal stripe shrinks and mostly disappears.

== Natural history ==
=== Breeding ===
Yosemite toads are explosive breeders (breed within a short time period), migrating to breeding pools and flooded areas in late spring while snowbanks still veil the frozen meadows. They have been termed the "toad that stays on its toes" or "tiptoeing toad" due to their habit of crossing snowdrifts without touching their abdomen to the cold snow. Breeding time varies greatly with elevation and yearly snowpack (April to July), and depends on timing of snowmelt. Males arrive to breeding ponds synchronously when the meadow is ca. 50% covered in snow. Depending on the population density they will either join a breeding chorus by making an advertisement call to females, or will actively search for them. Their vocalization is a high-pitched, sonorous trill lasting an average of 2.6 seconds and repeated frequently. Males intermittently call from pool margins, under logs, or inside willows to attract females. When females arrive, they are immediately grasped in amplexus by one or multiple males as the males fight for a limited number of mating opportunities. Breeding sex ratios can be very skewed toward males since females breed less frequently than males, although both sexes typically do not breed in consecutive years. While in amplexus, females will lay one clutch of 1,000–2,000 eggs. Eggs hatch after 1–2 weeks, and the length of time depends heavily on ambient temperature and fluctuations in temperature. Females generally breed once and leave after 2–3 days, while males remain for 1–2 weeks.

=== Habitat use ===
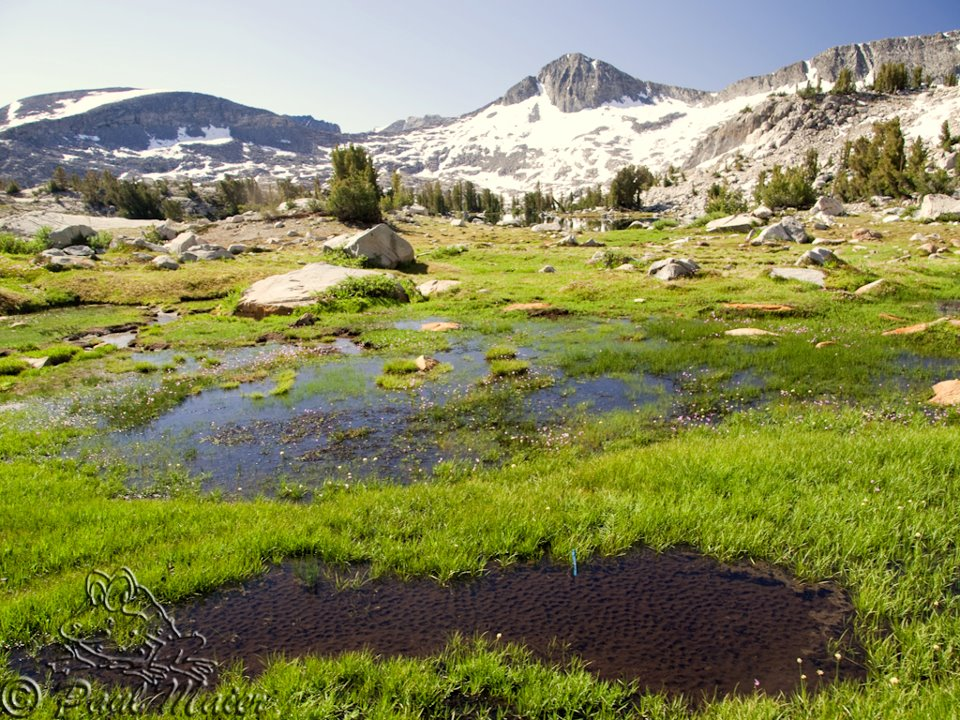
Yosemite toad breeding pool (note "golf ball" texture)

The species primarily uses montane and subalpine wet meadows for breeding, but will occasionally breed in ephemeral ponds, lake margins, or other riparian areas. Flatter, southwesterly meadows, with more precipitation, containing warmer waters seem to be favored by the species. More specifically, breeding takes place in shallow snowmelt ponds or flooded areas, and eggs are usually deposited in water less than 5 cm deep. Shallow water makes eggs vulnerable to freezing, because nighttime temperatures are particularly low during springtime snow melt off. Females will sometimes split their clutch into multiple areas, or deposit their clutch communally with other pairs in a single area. The relatively large amount of pigmentation in eggs and tadpoles is thought to help expedite development, and tadpoles will congregate in the shallowest, warmest margins of ponds during the day. At nighttime tadpoles settle down into the silty detritus where they are more insulated from the cold nighttime temperatures. This often gives their pools the appearance of "golf ball" texture, because tadpoles leave divots in the silt (see picture of breeding pool). It is not uncommon for a large number of breeding ponds to desiccate each season before tadpoles successfully metamorphose, hence there is apparently a selective tradeoff between shallow ponds (which accelerate tadpole development) and ponds with long hydroperiods (which ensure survival). Time from hatching to tadpole metamorphosis is 4–6 weeks, and this is highly dependent upon environmental factors (elevation, weather, food, competition) and possibly genetic background. Tadpoles are apparently unable to overwinter.

Subadult and adult habitat use patterns are poorly understood. Metamorphs appear to move away from breeding ponds soon after transformation, however they probably overwinter nearby in stream channels and associated vegetation (willows, sedges, and grasses). Many juveniles (1+ years in age) probably disperse farther upland into adult foraging habitat, especially by mid-summer of their second year, but they can also be found nearby breeding ponds. Adult upland foraging habitat tends to be covered in seeps and springs, willows, tall forbs, granitic boulders, or (at lower elevation) forest clearings. Rodent burrows play an essential role in providing shelter from predation and weather, as do willows, logs, and rocks. Overwintering habitat is also includes the burrows of rodents such as pocket gophers, voles, and Belding's ground squirrels, along with willow root tangles, which all probably keep an optimal thermal and mesic environmental for hibernating toads.

=== Movement patterns ===
Yosemite toads show high site fidelity to both breeding and upland foraging habitat, often using the same breeding pools and refuges in subsequent years. After breeding, adults forage in upland riparian areas of the breeding meadows, or (less commonly) disperse into the surrounding forest or subalpine environmental matrix. Although adult toads are capable of significant dispersal away from breeding pools, they are generally found within 90 m of permanent water; occasionally they are found in xeric forest habitat. Female toads disperse farther than males, and have been found to move up to 1.26 kilometers from their breeding grounds in one season. However, dispersal between meadows appears to be very low, estimated to be about 2% between 400 m meadows.

=== Over wintering ===
This is possibly due to unfavorably dry habitat between meadow complexes. Overwintering sites are rodent burrows or willow thickets (see "Habitat Utilization"), and the first freezing nighttime temperatures seem to cue adult toads to seek hibernacula. Hibernation usually begins in the late summer or early fall, between September and October.

=== Feeding ===
Like other toads, Yosemite toads are ambush predators. They lunge at prey and open their mandibles, causing their sticky tongue to unfold, flip downward, and pull the animal into their mouths. Adult stomach contents have included: tenebrionid beetles, ladybird beetles, weevils, craneflies, mosquitos, caterpillars, carpenter ants, dragonfly naiads, centipedes, julid millipedes, and spiders. Juvenile stomach contents have included: ants, spiders, and wasps. Metamorph stomach contents have included: owl flies, flies, springtails, spider mites, and spiders. There appears to be an ontogenetic shift from eating mostly spider mites (metamorphs), to eating a mix of spider mites, spiders, and tiny wasps (2 months post-metamorphosis), to eating mostly larger hymenopterans, mostly ants (juveniles), to eating 80% hymenopterans, consisting of bees and wasp (adults). Tadpoles are grazers on detritus and algae, however it remains unclear whether they ingest those items, bacteria, rotifers, or something else. Tadpoles are also known to opportunistically scavenge conspecific tadpoles, Sierra chorus frog tadpoles, Belding's ground squirrels, and predaceous diving beetle larvae, as well as graze on lodgepole pine pollen grains.

=== Adaptations to high elevation ===
Yosemite toads have several apparent adaptations to high elevation. Males live to be at least 12 years, and females until at least 15 years. Their longevity probably helps them outlast years of low snowpack that cause poor breeding conditions, and thus low metamorphic recruitment. They are largely diurnal in contrast to the majority of anurans, probably owing to the cold mountain temperatures. Aligning their activities with diel peaks in warmth allows them to absorb solar energy to catch and biosynthesize food. The high level of melanism in eggs and tadpoles (and possibly in adult females), as well as the tendency for tadpoles to congregate in the warm shallows, probably serves the same purpose. Similarly, the selection of shallow breeding sites by adults, and shallow water margins by tadpoles, probably reflects the intense pressure to metamorphose in a short season, and hence the importance of using high temperature for rapid development. The marked dichromatism between males and females is still an evolutionary mystery. One possible explanation sexual selection. Females could be sexually selecting for lighter coloration in males, as some kind of proxy for male fitness, or males could be signaling their maleness to attract females and ward off over-zealous males. Males of the Yosemite toad and many other bufonid species change into a lighter color during breeding (e.g. western toads, American toads), and other notable high elevation bufonids outside North America are highly sexually dichromatic (e.g. golden toads, yellow toads, marbled toads). Another more likely hypothesis is that males and females occupy largely different habitats, and evolution has de-coupled camouflage between the sexes. Males spend disproportionately more time in shallow, brown, silty breeding ponds, where they are highly exposed to predators. In contrast, females quickly leave pond habitat for rocky upland habitat where disruptive coloration may be more suitable. More than 60% of adults toads found in upland habitat during the late summer are females, whereas less than 10% are males. In lowland breeding habitat, this pattern is reversed: 54% of adult toads are males, and only 19% are females. Regardless of which hypothesis is correct, their diurnal habits make color and pattern subject to increased selection.

=== Lineage diversification and fusion ===
Karlstrom was the first to hypothesize, based on the distribution of A. canorus in Yosemite National Park, that glaciers had helped the species differentiate from A. boreas. The idea was that repeated glacial action had helped isolate the species in montane areas, and gradual adaptation there had helped it competitively exclude A. boreas from high elevation terrain. Recent work has showed this is likely true, and part of a larger pattern of glacial action bifurcating the species into new lineages. The species likely originated in the early Pleistocene, and many of the glacial cycles since then have isolated toads into western and eastern refugia; here they have adapted to different climatic conditions, reinforcing the formation of new lineages. Where the lineages came back into secondary contact, they occasionally fused into additional hybrid lineages, in cases where pre-post-zygotic barriers were low enough to allow hybridization, but high enough to allow hybrids to become distinct from parental types. Four distinct lineages were discovered in Yosemite National Park, in addition to three fused (hybrid) lineages; two lineages were also found in Kings Canyon National Park.

== Conservation ==
Yosemite toads are reported to have declined substantially in distribution and abundance across their restricted range. Although threats to persistence of the species are less understood than in other California amphibians such as the Sierra Nevada yellow-legged frog, the two most significant appear to be drought (increasing with climate change) and disease (primarily chytridiomycosis). Interactions between the two are not well understood. The species is listed as "Vulnerable" by the International Union for Conservation of Nature (IUCN), "Threatened" by the US Fish & Wildlife Service (USFWS) under the ESA, and "California species of special concern" by the California Department of Fish & Wildlife (CDFW).

== Systematics ==
Phylogeny of Anaxyrus

- Anaxyrus
  - boreas group
    - A. boreas
    - A. nelsoni
    - A. exsul
    - A. canorus ***
  - - A. punctatus
    - - A. quercicus
      - - debilis group
          - A. kelloggi
          - - A. debilis
            - A. retiformis
        - - A. speciosus
          - - A. cognatus
            - americanus group
              - - A. californicus
                - A. microscaphus
              - - A. americanus
                - A. baxteri
                - A. fowleri
                - A. hemiophrys
                - A. houstonensis
                - A. terrestris
                - A. velatus
                - A. woodhousii

The placement of A. canorus is shown with (***). The relationships of the A. boreas group and the A. americanus group need further systematic study and taxonomic revision. The displayed cladogram is a consensus of Pauly 2008, Fontenot et al. 2011, and Peralta-García et al. 2016. A. compactilis and A. mexicanus are excluded because of exclusion from those studies, and A. williamsi because of insufficient evidence for splitting off from A. boreas.
