= Section 521 rental assistance =

U.S. rental assistance under the Housing Act of 1949

Section 521 rental assistance is rental assistance authorized under Section 521 of the Housing Act of 1949 (42 U.S.C. 1441 et seq.). Owners of housing financed under Section 515 or Section 514 may receive rental assistance payments from the Rural Housing Service (RHS). The assistance payments enable eligible tenants to make monthly rent payments that do not exceed the greater of: (1) 30% of monthly adjusted family income; (2) 10 percent of monthly income; or, (3) the portion of the family’s welfare payment that is designated for housing costs. The rental assistance payments, which are made directly to the borrowers, make up the difference between the tenants’ payments and the RHS-approved rent for the units. Borrowers must agree to operate the property on a limited profit or nonprofit basis. The term of the rental assistance agreement is 20 years for new construction projects and 5 years for existing projects. Agreements may be renewed for up to 5 years. An eligible borrower who does not participate in the program may be petitioned to participate by 20 percent or more of the tenants eligible for rental assistance.
