= Section 523 loans =

Section 523 loans are a mutual self-help rural housing program in the United States authorized under Section 523 of the Housing Act of 1949 (42 U.S.C. 1441 et seq.) and administered by the Rural Housing Service (RHS). Nonprofit organizations may obtain 2-year loans to purchase and develop land that is to be subdivided into building sites for housing. The interest rate is 3% for these loans. Applicants must demonstrate a need for the proposed building sites in the locality. Sponsors also may obtain technical assistance (TA) grants to pay for all or part of the cost of developing, administering, and coordinating programs of technical and supervisory assistance to the families who are building their own homes. Each family is expected to contribute at least 700 hours of labor in building homes for each other. Applicants must demonstrate that:

(1) there is a need for self-help housing in the area;
(2) the applicant has or can hire qualified people to carry out its responsibilities under the program; and,
(3) funds for the proposed TA project are not available from other sources.

The program is generally limited to very low- and low-income families. Moderate income families may be eligible to participate provided they are unable to pay for a home built by the contract method. TA funds may not be used to hire construction workers or to buy real estate or building materials. Private or public nonprofit corporations, however, may be eligible for 2-year site loans under Section 523. The loans may be used to purchase and develop land in rural areas. The land is subdivided into building sites and sold on a nonprofit basis to low and moderate income families. Generally, a land loan must result in at least 10 home sites. The sites need not be contiguous. Sites financed through Section 523 may be sold only to families who are building homes by the mutual self-help method. The homes are financed through the Section 502 program.
