= Section 504 =

Section 504 may refer to:

- Section 504 loans and grants, under the United States Housing Act of 1949
- Section 504 of the Rehabilitation Act, United States legislation
