= Marina Village =

Marina Village may refer to:

- Marina Village, California
- Marina Village (Abu Dhabi)
- Marina Village (Bridgeport, Connecticut)
