= Section 524 loans =

Section 524 loans are land acquisition and development loans in the United States that are authorized under Section 524 of the federal Housing Act of 1949 (42 U.S.C. 1441 et seq.).

Nonprofit organizations and Indian tribes may obtain loans from the Rural Housing Service (RHS) to purchase and develop land that is to be subdivided into building sites for housing low-income and moderate-income families. The loans are made for a 2-year period. Sites financed through Section 524 have no restrictions on the methods by which the homes are financed or constructed. The interest rate on Section 524 site loans is the U.S. Treasury cost of funds.
