= Section 516 grants =

Section 516 grants are a USDA farm labor housing program authorized by Section 516 of the Housing Act of 1949 (42 U.S.C. 1441 et seq.). Qualified nonprofit organizations, Indian tribes, or public bodies obtain grants for the development cost of farm labor housing. Grants may be used simultaneously with Section 514 loans if the housing, for which there is a “pressing need,” will not be built without assistance from the Rural Housing Service (RHS). Grants may be made for up to 90% of the development cost of the housing. In a given fiscal year, up to 10% of the Section 516 funds shall be for domestic and migrant farm worker housing. Applicants must contribute at least 10% of the total development costs from their own resources or from other sources including Section 514 loans. Funds may be used to buy, build, or improve housing and related facilities for farm workers, and to purchase and improve the land where the housing will be located, including installation of streets, water supply and waste disposal systems, parking areas, and driveways as well as for the purchase and installation of appliances such as ranges, refrigerators, and clothes washers and dryers. Related facilities may include the maintenance workshop, recreation center, small infirmary, laundry room, day care center, and office and living quarters for the resident manager.
