= Single-family =

Single-family may refer to:

- Single-family detached home, a free-standing residential building
- Single-family loan, a rural housing loan
- Single-family office, a private company that manages investments and trusts for a single wealthy family
