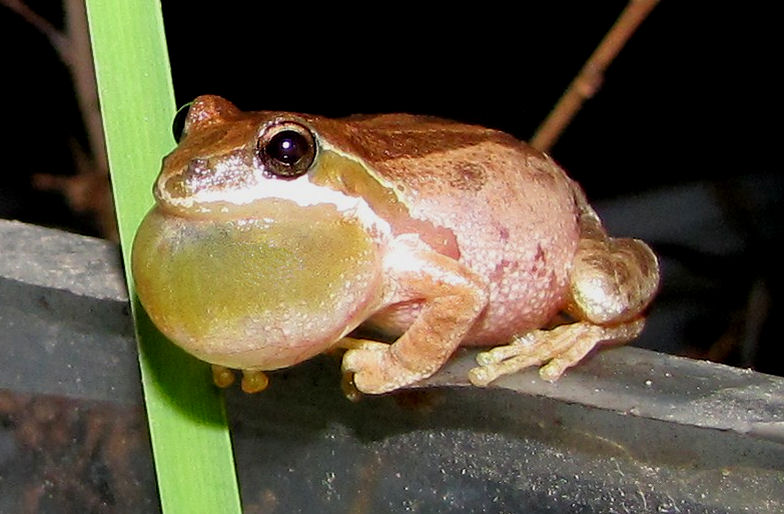

Scientific classification
- Kingdom: Animalia
- Phylum: Chordata
- Class: Amphibia
- Order: Anura
- Family: Hylidae
- Genus: Pseudacris
- Species: P. hypochondriaca

Binomial name
- Pseudacris hypochondriaca (Hallowell, 1854)
- Pseudacris hypochondriaca range map (2016), from the California Department of Fish and Wildlife

Synonyms
- Hyla scapularis var. hypochondriaca Hallowell, 1854

= Baja California chorus frog =

Species of amphibian

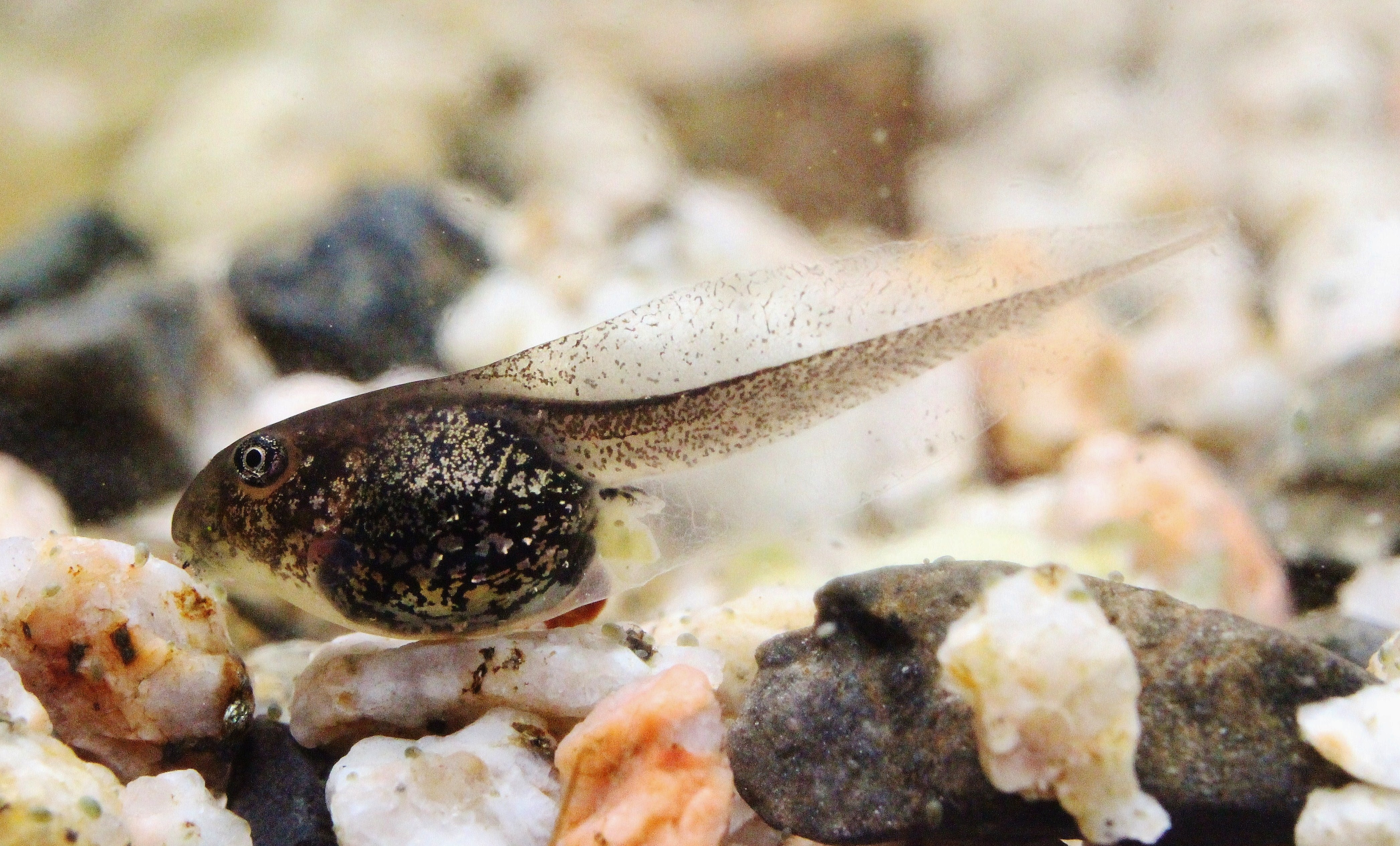
38-day-old tadpole

The Baja California chorus frog (Pseudacris hypochondriaca) is a cathemeral species of treefrog of Western North America. It was formerly considered as a population of the Pacific chorus frog (Pseudacris regilla), but was split and raised to species status in 2006. The species ranges on the west coast of the North America from Baja California through southern California. Individuals live from sea level to more than 10,000 feet in many types of habitats, reproducing in aquatic settings.

== Description ==
The Baja California chorus frog can grow .75 - 2 inches long from snout to vent (1.9 - 5.1 cm).

It has a dark stripe that extends from its nostrils through the eyes to shoulders. It can be a variety of colors, including green, tan, brown, gray, reddish, and cream, and has the ability to change color in response to environmental conditions. The dark stripe does not change color, but the body color and markings can change hue, chroma, and lightness to aide with camouflage. The belly is pale with yellow underneath the legs. There is also a Y-shaped or triangular marking between the eyes, a common feature in chorus frogs. It has large toe pads that aid it in climbing trees, although it is not technically a tree frog, and mostly a ground-dweller.

The male's throat is dark colored.

== Taxonomy ==
Baja California chorus frogs have long been known as Pacific chorus frogs (Pseudacris regilla or Hyla regilla). However, in 2006, that taxonomic concept was split into three species based on mitochondrial DNA comparisons. Recuero et al. attached the name Pseudacris regilla to the northern species, renaming the central species the Sierran tree frog (Pseudacris sierra) and the southern species the Baja California tree frog (Pseudacris hypochondriaca). Because the paper provided no maps or discussion of how to diagnose the species, it has been an extremely controversial taxonomic revision, but has been incorporated into Amphibian Species of the World 6.0. The taxonomic confusion introduced by this name change means that much of the information about Pseudacris hypochondriaca is attached to the name "Pseudacris regilla".

== Cultural importance ==
Because this species of chorus frog is found near Hollywood, its vocalizations have frequently been used as stock sounds for film and television. As a result, its distinctive advertising call of "ribbit, ribbit" has become a standard representation of frog vocalizations in the English-speaking world, despite the fact that only it and a few closely related species actually make the sound.
