= Marina Village (Bridgeport, Connecticut) =

Housing project in Bridgeport, Connecticut, USA

Coordinates: 41°10′03″N 73°11′48″W

Marina Village is a housing project located in Bridgeport, Connecticut. Marina Village was built in 1940 with support from the Bridgeport NAACP. It is run by the Bridgeport Housing Authority and was developed as a result of the Housing Act of 1949.

== Crime ==
An organization that operates out of this housing project is the "Marina Village Bloods". According to the Bridgeport Police Department, this group has a rivalry with another gang that has ties to both Puerto Rico and Springfield, Massachusetts called the "Lady Stacks". The FBI executed "Operation Slim Fast" that resulted in the arrests of nineteen individuals. It also resulted in the seizure of approximately 8.8 pounds (4.0 kg) of cocaine, a 1 pound (0.45 kg) of crack, quantities of heroin, six firearms and $150,000 of cash.
