= Section 504 loans and grants =

Section 504 loans and grants are a USDA rural housing repair program authorized under Section 504 of the Housing Act of 1949. Under current regulations, rural homeowners with incomes of 50% or less of the area median may qualify for the Rural Housing Service (RHS) direct loans to repair their homes. Loans are limited to $20,000 and have a 20-year term at a 1% interest rate. Owners of age 62 or more may qualify for grants of up to $7,500 to pay for needed repairs that remove a health or safety hazard. To qualify for the grants, the elderly must be unable to obtain affordable credit elsewhere. Depending on the cost of the repairs and the income of the homeowner, the owner may be eligible for a grant for the full cost of the repairs or for some combination of a loan and a grant to covers repair costs. The combination loan and grant may total no more than $27,500.
