= Rural Community Advancement Program =

Agriculture improvement program in the United States

The Rural Community Advancement Program is a program established by the 1996 farm bill (P.L. 104-127, Sec. 761) under which USDA is authorized to provide state rural development block grants, direct and guaranteed loans, and other assistance to meet rural development needs across the country. Program funding is allocated to three accounts: (1) community facilities, (2) rural utilities, and (3) rural business and cooperative development.

== See also ==
- Rural Development Trust Fund (7 U.S.C. 2009).
