= Section 502 loans =

U.S. rural housing loan program

Section 502 loans are a rural housing loan program, administered by the Rural Housing Service (RHS), authorized under Section 502 of the Housing Act of 1949. Borrowers may obtain loans for purchasing or repairing new or existing single-family housing. Loans are made directly by RHS (7 CFR 3550) or by private lenders with a USDA guarantee (7 CFR 3555). Borrowers with income of 80% or less of the area median may be eligible for 33- year direct loans and may receive payment assistance to bring the interest rate to as low as 1%. In a given fiscal year, at least 40% of the units financed under this section must be made available only to very low-income families or individuals (below 50% of the area median). In addition, families or individuals at or below 60% of the area median may qualify for loan terms up to 38 years. Borrowers must have the means to repay the loans, but be unable to secure reasonable credit terms elsewhere. Borrowers with income of up to 115% of the area median may be eligible for 30-year guaranteed loans from private lenders. Priority is given to first-time home buyers, and the RHS may require that borrowers complete a home ownership counseling program.
