= Section 533 grants =

Grants under the USDA rural housing rehabilitation program

Section 533 grants are a USDA rural housing rehabilitation program authorized under Section 533 of the Housing Act of 1949 (42 U.S.C. 1441 et seq.). The Rural Housing Service (RHS) is authorized to make grants to capable organizations for:

(1) rehabilitating single-family housing in rural areas that is owned by low- and very low-income families;
(2) rehabilitating rural rental properties; and,
(3) rehabilitating rural cooperative housing structured to provide affordable housing to low- and very low-income occupants.

The homes must be located in rural areas and be in need of housing preservation assistance. Assisted families must meet the income restrictions (income of 80% or less of the median income for the area) and must have occupied the property for at least one year prior to receiving assistance. Occupants of leased homes may be eligible for assistance if

(1) the unexpired portion of the lease extends for 5 years or more, and
(2) the lease permits the occupant to make modifications to the structure and precludes the owner from increasing the rent because of the modifications.
