= Community Facilities Program =

The Community Facilities Program (CFP), administered by the Rural Housing Service (RHS) of the United States Department of Agriculture (USDA), provides grants, loans, and loan guarantees to local governments, federally recognized tribes, and non-profit organizations.

Funds are used to construct, expand, or rehabilitate such community facilities as hospitals, clinics, nursing homes, ambulatory care centers, police and fire stations, rescue and fire vehicles, communication centers, telecommunications, distance learning and telemedicine, child and adult care centers, jails, courthouses, airports, and schools. The program is now one of the funding accounts administered under the Rural Community Advancement Program (RCAP).
