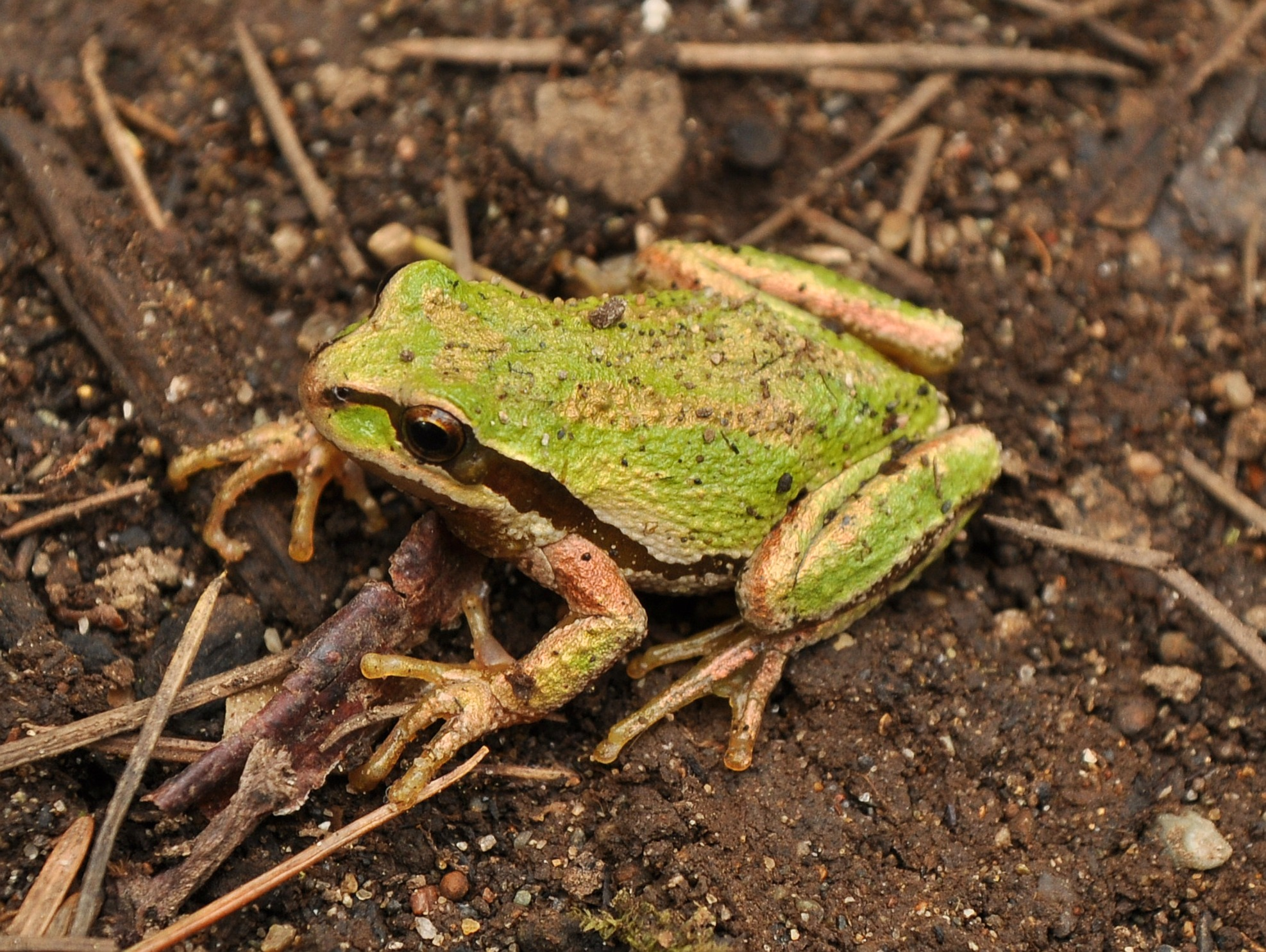

Conservation status
- Least Concern (IUCN 3.1)

Scientific classification
- Kingdom: Animalia
- Phylum: Chordata
- Class: Amphibia
- Order: Anura
- Family: Hylidae
- Genus: Pseudacris
- Species: P. regilla

Binomial name
- Pseudacris regilla (Baird & Girard, 1852)

Synonyms
- Hyla regilla Baird and Girard, 1852

= Pacific tree frog =

Species of amphibian

The Pacific tree frog (Pseudacris regilla), also known as the Pacific chorus frog, has a range spanning the Pacific Northwest, from Northern California, Oregon, and Washington to British Columbia in Canada and extreme southern Alaska. They live from sea level to more than 10,000 feet in many types of habitats, reproducing in aquatic settings. They occur in shades of greens or browns and can change colors over periods of hours and weeks.

== Taxonomy ==
The taxonomy of this frog has a complex history. First, the frog was moved from the genus Hyla to the genus Pseudacris in 1986, and Hyliola in 2016 (an elevation of the subgenus which has not been widely accepted). In 2006, Recuero et al. split the frog into three species based on DNA evidence. Recuero et al. used incorrect names for two of the three populations, but subsequent authors established that the correct name (i.e., the oldest available name) for the northern component is Pseudacris regilla, for the central one Pseudacris sierra, and for the southern one Pseudacris hypochondriaca. This revision has been controversial but the evidence is supported by other research (e.g.,), and is followed in this article. Sources such as iNaturalist do not adhere to the revised classification, and treat all three species as a single taxon.

== Anatomy and morphology ==
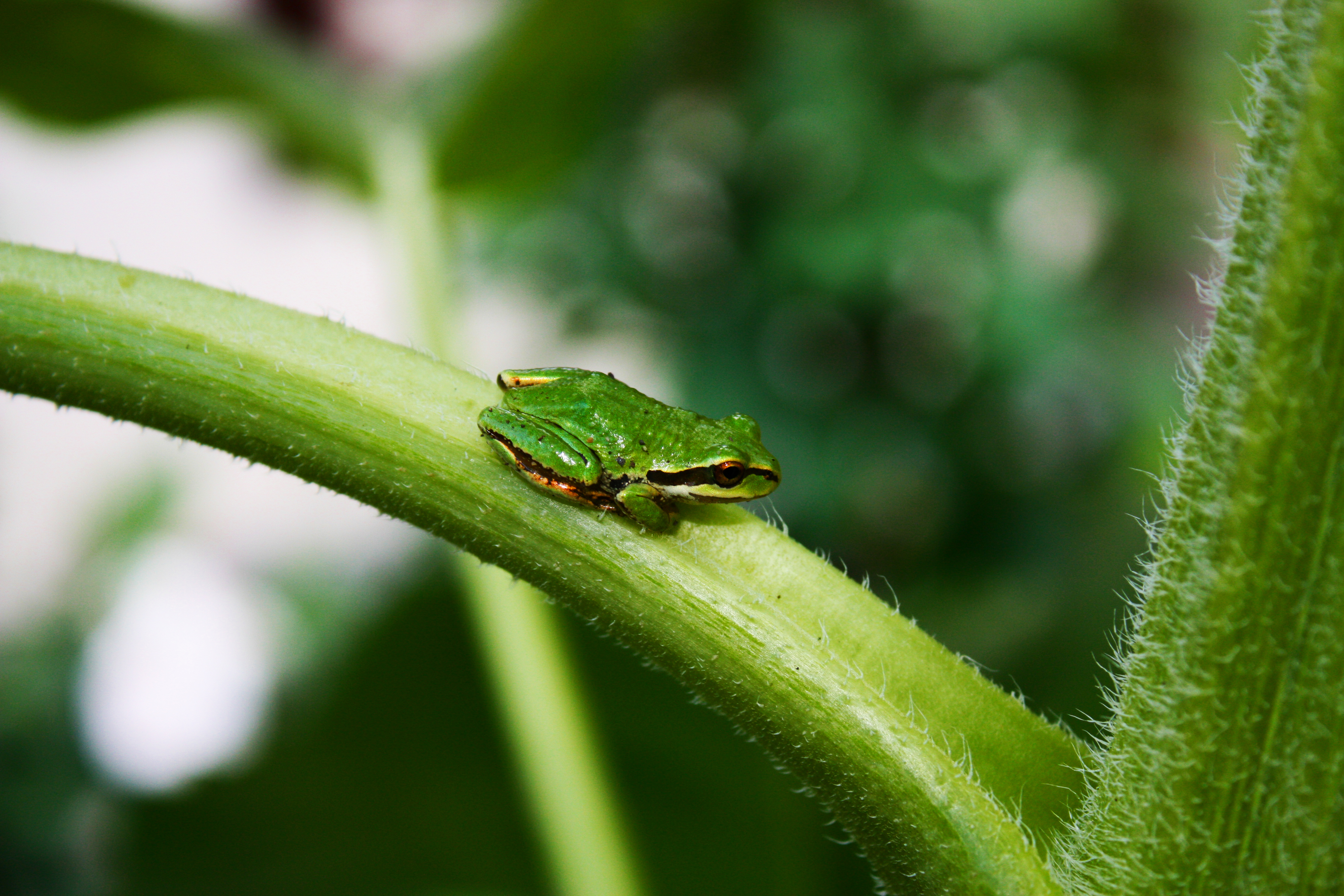
A Pacific tree frog (green morph) sitting on a sunflower leaf stem, Nanoose Bay British Columbia

The Pacific tree frog grows up to two inches from snout to urostyle. The males are usually smaller than the females and have a dark patch on their throats. The dark patch is the vocal sac, which stretches out when the male is calling. Pacific tree frogs can be a number of different colors, including green, tan, reddish, gray, brown, cream, and black, but most are a shade of green or brown, with pale or white bellies. They have a variety of dark and spotty markings on their backs and sides and can be identified by a black or dark brown eye stripe that stretches from the nose, across the eye, and back to the shoulder. They can change color seasonally to better match their environments. Their skin is covered in small bumps. They have long legs compared to their bodies and they tend to be slender. Their toes are long and only very slightly webbed. On the end of each toe is a round, sticky toe pad or disk used for climbing and sticking to surfaces. Males also have an extra, and far less noticeable toe on their outer thumbs used exclusively in amplexus. Fertilization is external.

== Distribution, habitat and ecology ==
Pacific tree frogs are common on the Pacific coast of Oregon and Washington. They are also found in California, famously as the frog residents of Yosemite Valley. They are also found ranging west of the Rockies in British Columbia, Idaho, and Montana. A small population also exists in a pond on Revillagigedo Island near Ketchikan, Alaska, having been intentionally introduced there in the 1960s. They are found upland in ponds, streams, lakes and sometimes even further away from water; their habitat includes a wide variety of climate and vegetation from sea level to high altitudes. The Pacific tree frog makes its home in riparian habitat, as well as woodlands, grassland, chaparral, pasture land, and even urban areas including back yard ponds. Eggs of the Pacific tree frog may be consumed by the rough-skinned newt and other amphibians.

== Reproduction, development and behavior ==
The Pacific tree frog begins mating in early winter to early spring. Since these frogs are so widespread geographically, their breeding season is thought to be determined by local conditions. When it is time, the males migrate to the water. They then make a call at the same time. This lures the females to the water, where they mate. The females lay their eggs in clumps of 10–90, and usually put them on and under vegetation and leaf litter in the pond. Females usually lay their eggs in shallow, calm water that has little action around it. If they survive, embryos will hatch into tadpoles within one to three weeks. The tadpoles feed on periphyton, filamentous algae, diatoms, and pollen in or on the surface of the water. They feed using suction, and a beak-like structure that helps scrape vegetation off surfaces.

The species attracts mates using a choral song. Males call to females as loudly as possible and produce a croak so loud that they sound as though they are produced by multiple males. These sounds can be heard by numerous females. Once a female approaches, the male stops singing and attempts amplexus. Breeding takes place at night, near shallow water, typically after rainfall. Mating season usually extends from December to May, although some variation occurs. Altitude often affects the length of the breeding season. (Dickerson, 1906; Grinnell and Storer, 1924; Schaub and Larsen Jr, 1978)

Metamorphosis usually follows about two to two and a half months later, but experience raising these tadpoles shows that some may delay metamorphosis, changing up to five months after hatching. The survival rate of these delayed metamorphs is lower, and the evolutionary utility of this delayed metamorphosis is uncertain. It may be related to the prevalence of fire in their natural ecosystem.

During the final stages of transformation when the tadpoles have four limbs and a tail, they stop feeding for a short time while their mouths widen and their digestive systems adjust from herbivorous to carnivorous. Pacific tree frogs mature quickly, and usually mate the season after metamorphosis. They can live up to eight years in captivity.

Pacific tree frogs are mostly nocturnal, but occasionally they can be seen moving and heard calling during the day. These frogs spend a lot of time hiding under rotten logs, rocks, long grasses, and leaf litter, where they are very difficult to see unless they move. Predators include snakes, raccoons, herons, egrets, and other small mammals and reptiles.

When they hunt, their toe pads allow them to climb on vegetation and other surfaces where they are able to ambush their prey. Much of their diets consists of spiders, beetles, flies, ants, and other insects and arthropods; they can and do eat insects that are almost as large as they are, and will expand their bodies slightly to accommodate these meals. When they sense potential food nearby, they commonly twitch a toe to attract it to within easy reach of their tongues.

They produce several call types. These include the males' advertisement call, commonly described as "ribbit" or "crek-ek", as well as an encounter trill call. The cre-ek call can be quite loud and can thus be heard from very far away. Males also produce a "dry land call", a long cre-ee-ee-eeek, that can be heard anytime in the year except during the coldest and driest periods. Pacific tree frogs are the most commonly heard frogs along much of the West Coast of the United States.

== Green and brown color morphs ==
Previously, adults were thought to occur in two different fixed colors: green and brown. Now, some of them have been found to be able to change between the two. They can also change from lighter to darker, shift from patterned markings to pure colors and vice versa, and even display combinations of colors, brown/green being the most frequent.

These color-changing morphs are triggered not by color change in their environments, but a change in background brightness. This type of environmental change would be caused by seasonal fluctuation. A full change in the dorsal coloration of a color morph can take from weeks to months, but initial changes can occur in just a few hours. This has been shown to be a very useful cryptic survival feature for these frogs.

Skin color is produced via pigment cells called chromatophores. Three types of chromatophores are commonly found in amphibians: xanthophores, which contain yellow, orange, or red pigments and are found uppermost on the dermis; iridophores, which lie below the xanthophores and function by reflecting and scattering white light up through them (in the case of Pseudacris regilla and many other North American frogs, iridophores reflect blue light through the yellow pigment cells above to create a green frog) and melanophores, which are the deepest pigment cells and are responsible for the presence of black and brown pigments.

A rare, recessive "blue morph" is known. One is housed at the Humboldt State University Natural History Museum in Arcata, California. This mutation might inhibit the xanthophores' ability to produce yellow pigments, thus the normally green frog (possibly of the color-unchanging type) appears blue.

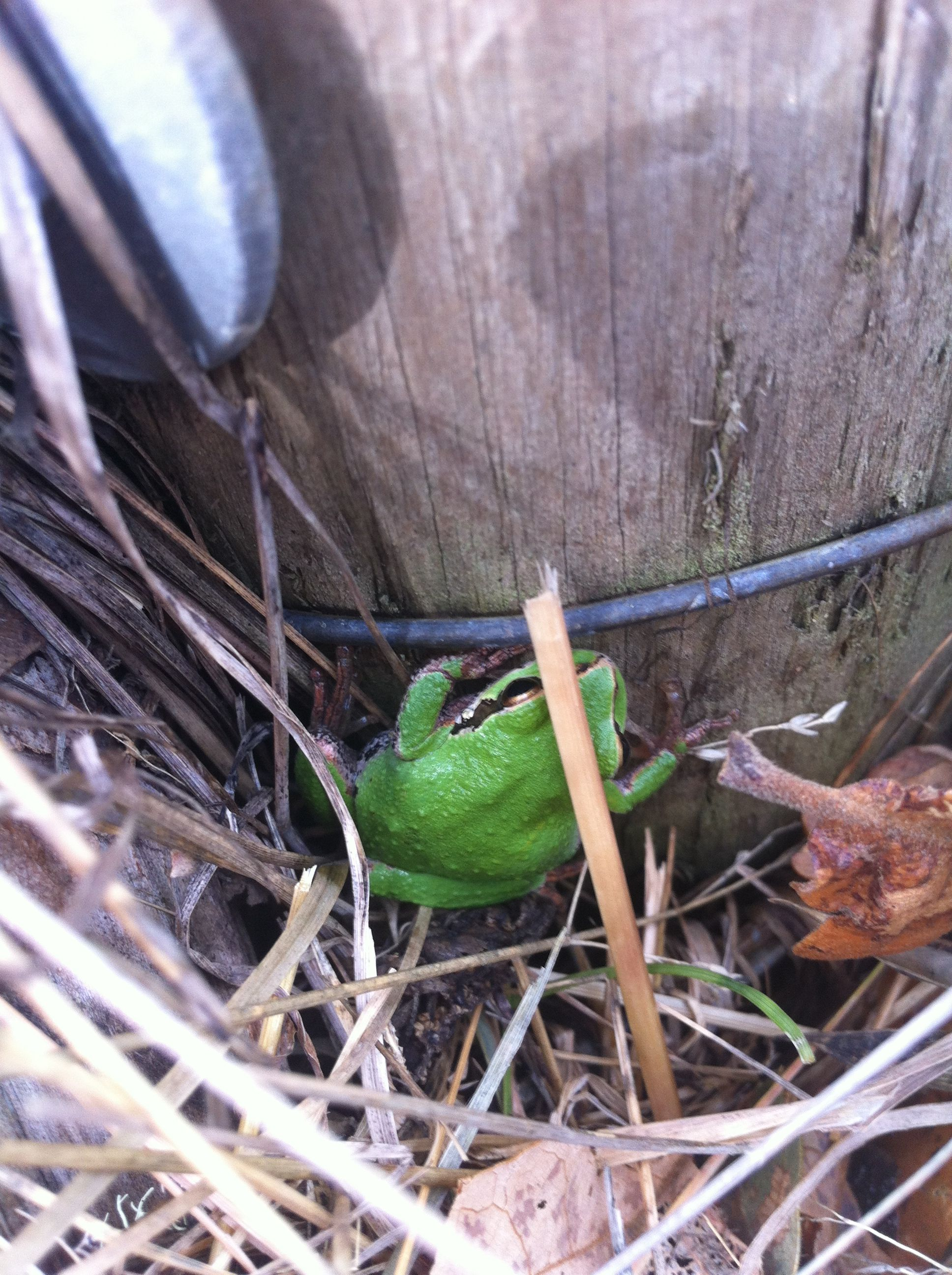
Green color morph

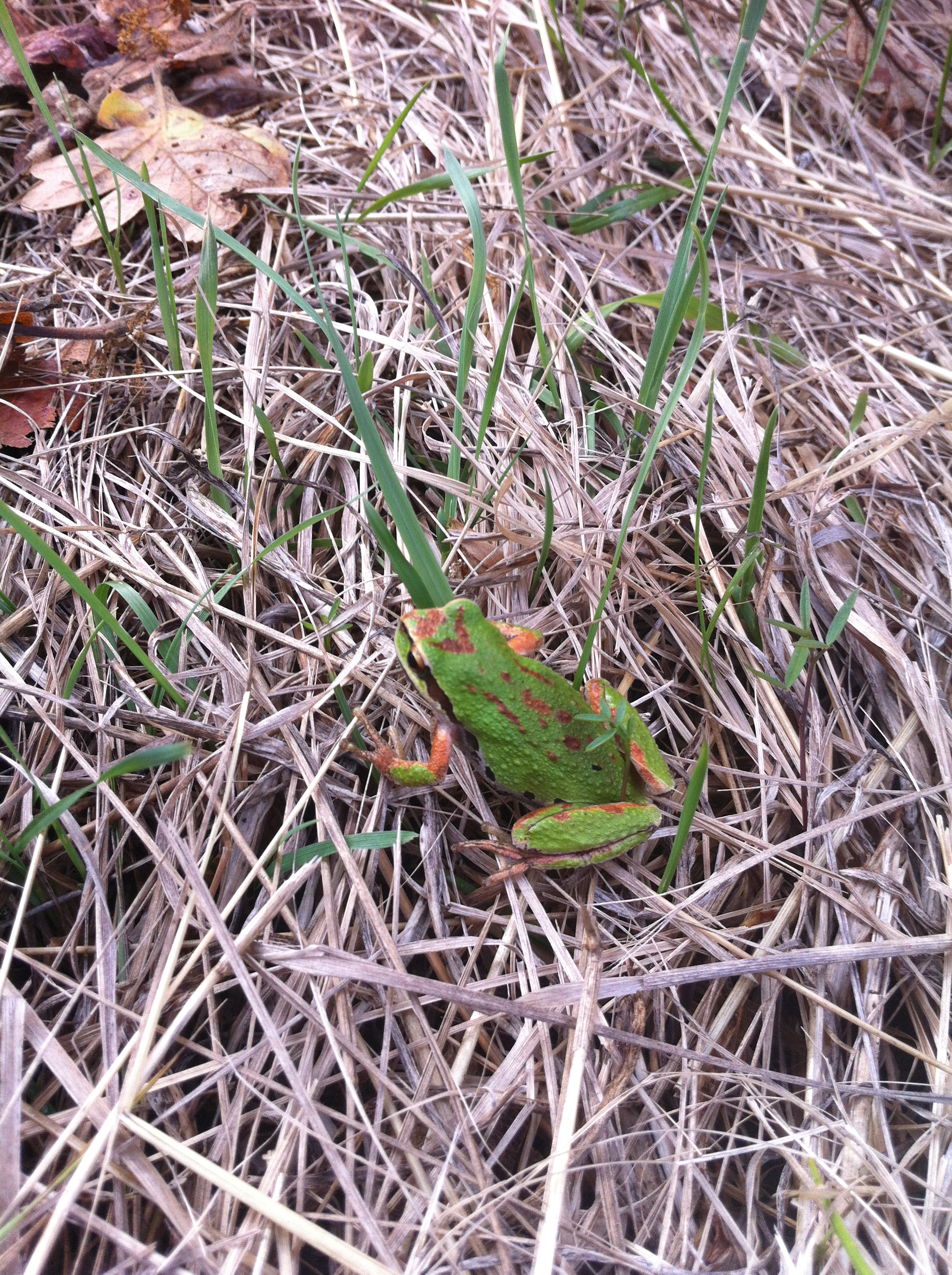
Blended color morph green with brown stripes

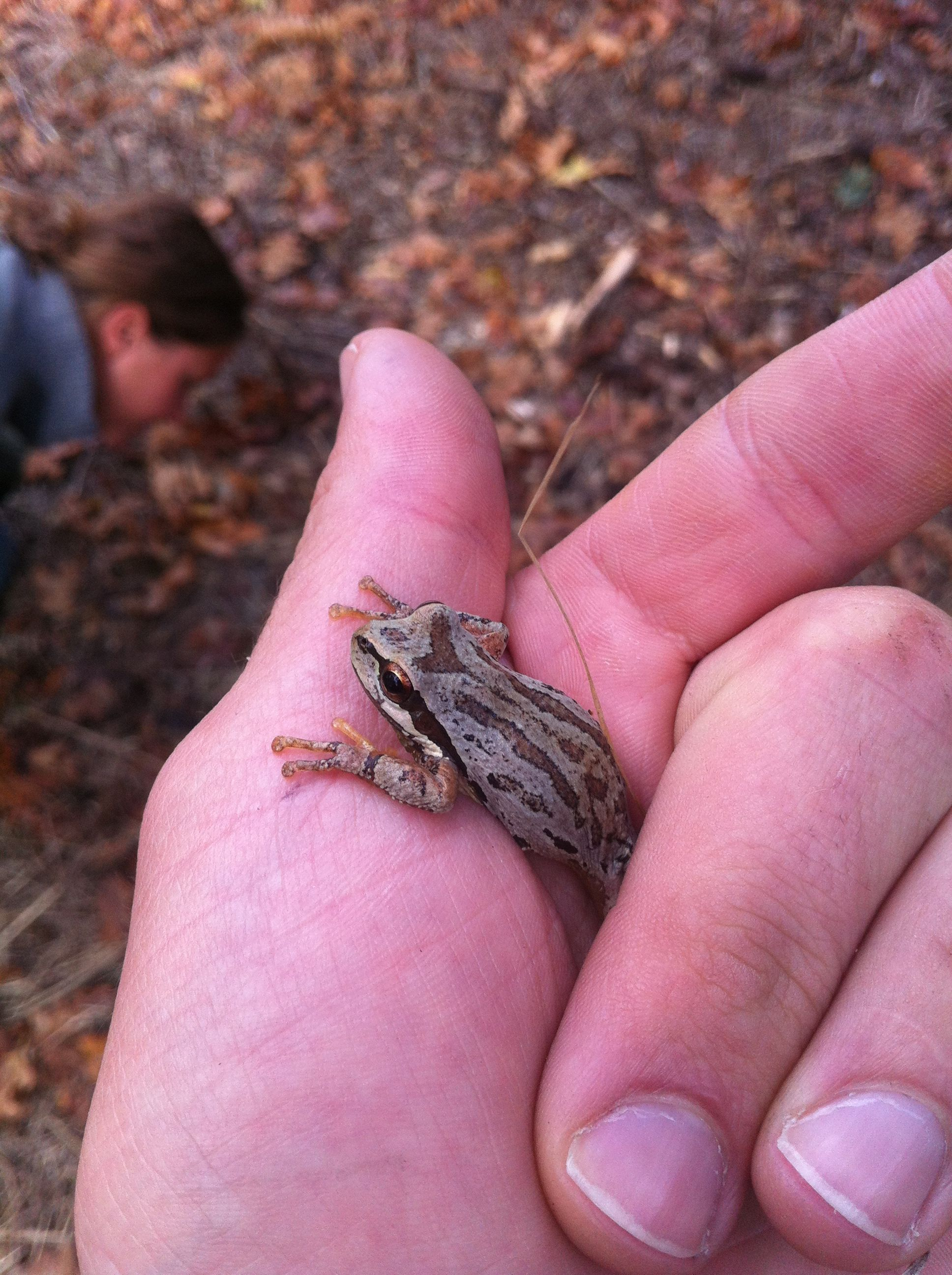
Brown color morph held in hand.

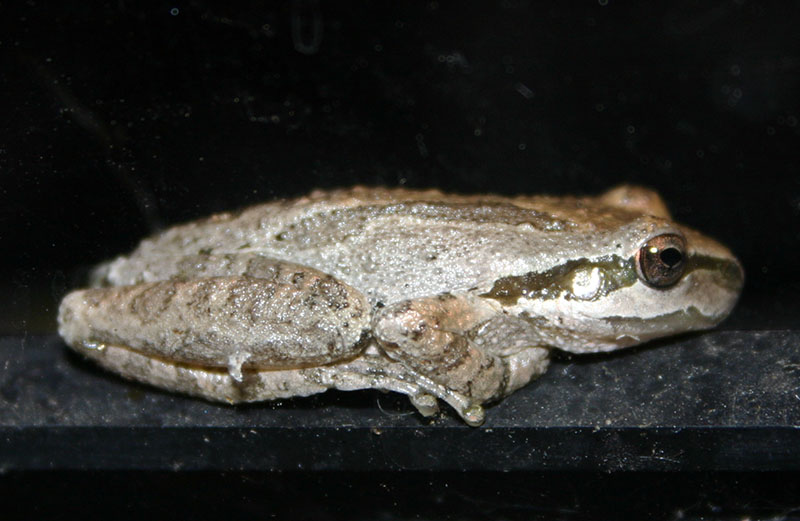
Side view showing a color variant.

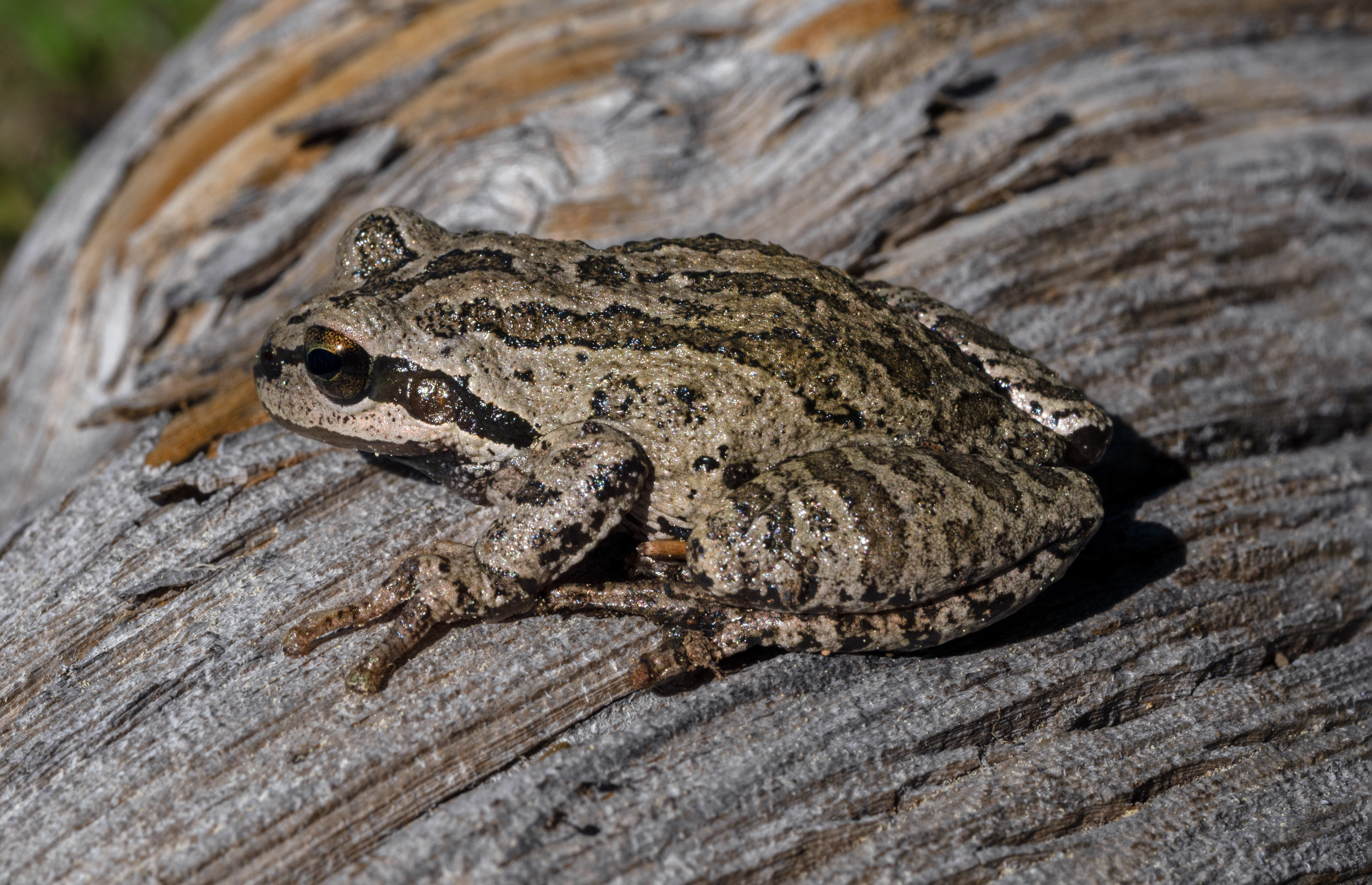
Brown color variant

== Homing ==
Research was conducted on Pacific tree frogs to determine whether or not they have homing instincts and what was their main source for knowing where their home was. Researchers marked the frogs and moved them 300 yards away from their pond. Several days later, the researchers did a recapture on the original pond in which 66.3% of the frogs were recaptured, indicating there was some source of homing instinct. This was made apparent again when 24 frogs were placed into a larger pond, and 20 of those frogs returned to their original pond. The frogs' movement patterns and olfactory, auditory, and kinesthetic senses could be explanations for the homing, but no single factor was able to explain the results, indicating that these frogs might be using all or a combination of these factors for homing.

== Conservation status ==
These frogs (if one includes the two very closely related species, as discussed above) are the most common frogs on the West Coast of North America. Although Pacific tree frogs remain abundant, some other species found in the same areas, such as California red-legged frogs, are declining. Most populations of tree frogs appear healthy, and they have no concern or conservation status.

== Regional importance ==
In 2007, the Pacific tree frog was named the state amphibian of the State of Washington. It is also a very important species in all of the regions where it is found because it is a keystone species. Many other species, such as garter snakes, depend upon its abundance as a prey item for their survival.
