= Rural Development Trust Fund =

Trust fund

The Rural Development Trust Fund, authorized under the United States 1996 farm bill (P.L. 104-127), is used to distribute Rural Community Assistance Program funds. Funds are allocated among states based on such factors as rural population, income, and unemployment.
