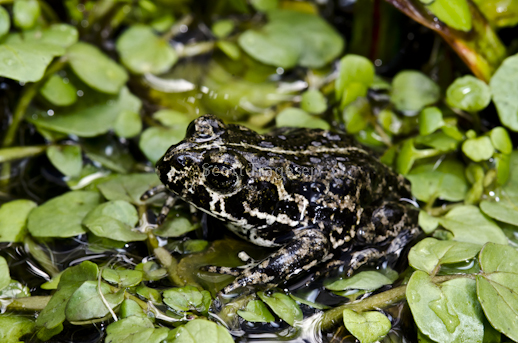

Conservation status
- Vulnerable (IUCN 3.1)

- Critically Imperiled (NatureServe)

Scientific classification
- Kingdom: Animalia
- Phylum: Chordata
- Class: Amphibia
- Order: Anura
- Family: Bufonidae
- Genus: Anaxyrus
- Species: A. exsul

Binomial name
- Anaxyrus exsul (Myers, 1942)
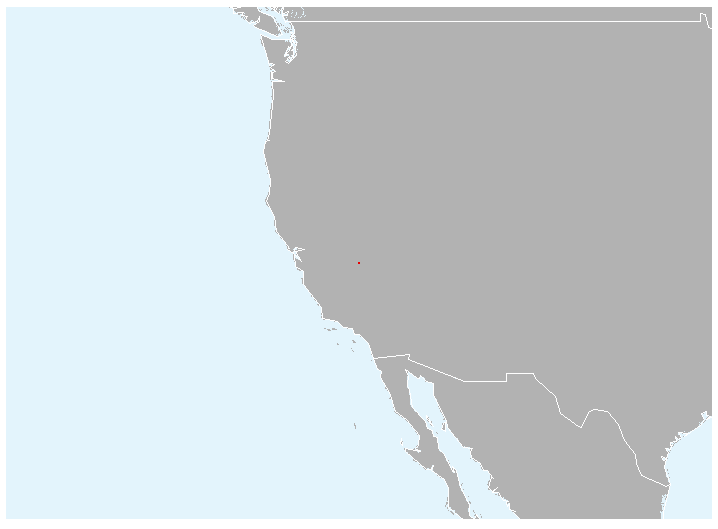

Synonyms
- Bufo exsul Myers, 1942

= Black toad =

Species of amphibian

The black toad (Anaxyrus exsul), also known as the Inyo toad or Deep Springs toad, is a true toad that lives only in scattered oases in the Deep Springs Valley of Inyo County, California. In fact, its original scientific name, Bufo exsul, means "exiled toad", which refers to its species' isolation in a tiny spot in the high desert wilderness of the Californian Great Basin.

== Description ==
The toad's black skin is covered in white and tan speckles and it sports a white midline down its spine from head to rump. Adults are approximately 5 centimetres (2.0 in) in length. They are active during the warmer months and overwinter underground near their native springs. This species walks rather than hops, and never strays far from water. Male black toads do not have vocal sacs and do not make a real advertisement call, but rather a small chirping noise as a territorial call around other males; much like its close relative the western toad (Anaxyrus boreas).

== Conservation status ==
The habitat of the black toad is relatively intact, however it is still considered a vulnerable species because although it is abundant within its habitat, the black toad has a very limited range. Deep Springs College continues a program to care for the wild population of this species, and owns much of the land where its habitat is found. Livestock grazing has occurred in much of the toad habitat for more than one hundred years, and grazing, vegetation management, and irrigation have been suggested as increasing the suitable habitat for the species, which breeds in otherwise comparatively rare open water. As noted in the IUCN Red List, the population of this species was reported to be more or less stable in the early 1970s, and no significant change was reported in 1990 or 1999. The population at Antelope Springs was once reported to have died out, but was found by researchers in 2003, and is now apparently thriving where vegetation has been maintained in a suitable state. In 1977 it was estimated that there were more than 80,000 individuals in the population.

The toad's primary habitat is watercourses, irrigation ditches, and marshes (grass, sedge, dwarf bulrush, and watercress) formed by waterflow from springs, surrounded by cold desert steppe. Adults are more aquatic than other toad species in California, and breed in shallow marsh and pond waters. The toads retreat to rodent burrows or other refuges in winter. At present, there do not appear to be any major threats to this species. However, potential future threats might include habitat destruction from changes in irrigation schemes or other factors resulting in water table alteration, well-intentioned but non-scientifically based conservation efforts, changes in water availability, recreational vehicle use, collection by humans, changes in grazing regimes and predation by introduced fish. Other desert toads in nearby areas have done well, and even thrived, with more active management. Black toad adults prefer habitats with short plant cover and unobstructed access to still or slowly flowing water. In recent years, fencing some springs to exclude cattle has resulted in an overgrowth of vegetation requiring hand cutting to keep the habitat accessible for toads. The toads have been able to maintain a fairly stable population regardless of changes in agriculture and grazing practices over the past 20 years.

The black toad was federally listed as a species "threatened with extinction" in 1967 by the authority of the Endangered Species Preservation Act of 1966. Following the passage of the Endangered Species Act of 1973 (ESA), the species was proposed for a threatened status under the replacement legislation and critical habitat was outlined. However, with the passage of amendments to the ESA in 1978, these materials were invalidated and the window of time for the ESA listing proposal to be finalized lapsed in 1980. At present the black toad is designated as a "Fully Protected" and "Threatened" species of California at the state level only.
