= Section 514 loans =

American agricultural loan

Section 514 loans are a domestic, farm labor housing program in the United States, authorized under Section 514 of the Housing Act of 1949. They are the only nationwide program to provide housing for farm laborers. The Rural Housing Service (RHS) makes loans to farm owners, associations of farm owners, Indian tribes, or nonprofit organizations to provide modest living quarters, basic household furnishings, and related facilities. Loans may also be used to repair existing housing for farm labor use. The loans are repayable in 33 years and bear an interest rate of 1%.

Applicants, who own farms or who represent farm owners, must demonstrate that the farming operations have a need for farm labor housing and must agree to own and operate the property on a nonprofit basis. Except for state and local public agencies or political subdivisions, the applicants must be unable to provide the housing from their own resources. They must also be unable to obtain the credit from other sources, on terms and conditions that they could reasonably be expected to fulfill and still provide farmworker housing at rental rates that would be affordable to the workers. The RHS may make exceptions to the “credit elsewhere” test. For instance, when there is a need in the area for housing for migrant farm workers and the applicant will provide such housing. Exceptions may also be made when there is no state or local body or no nonprofit organization that is willing and able to provide the housing within a reasonable period of time.
