= California Fully Protected Species =

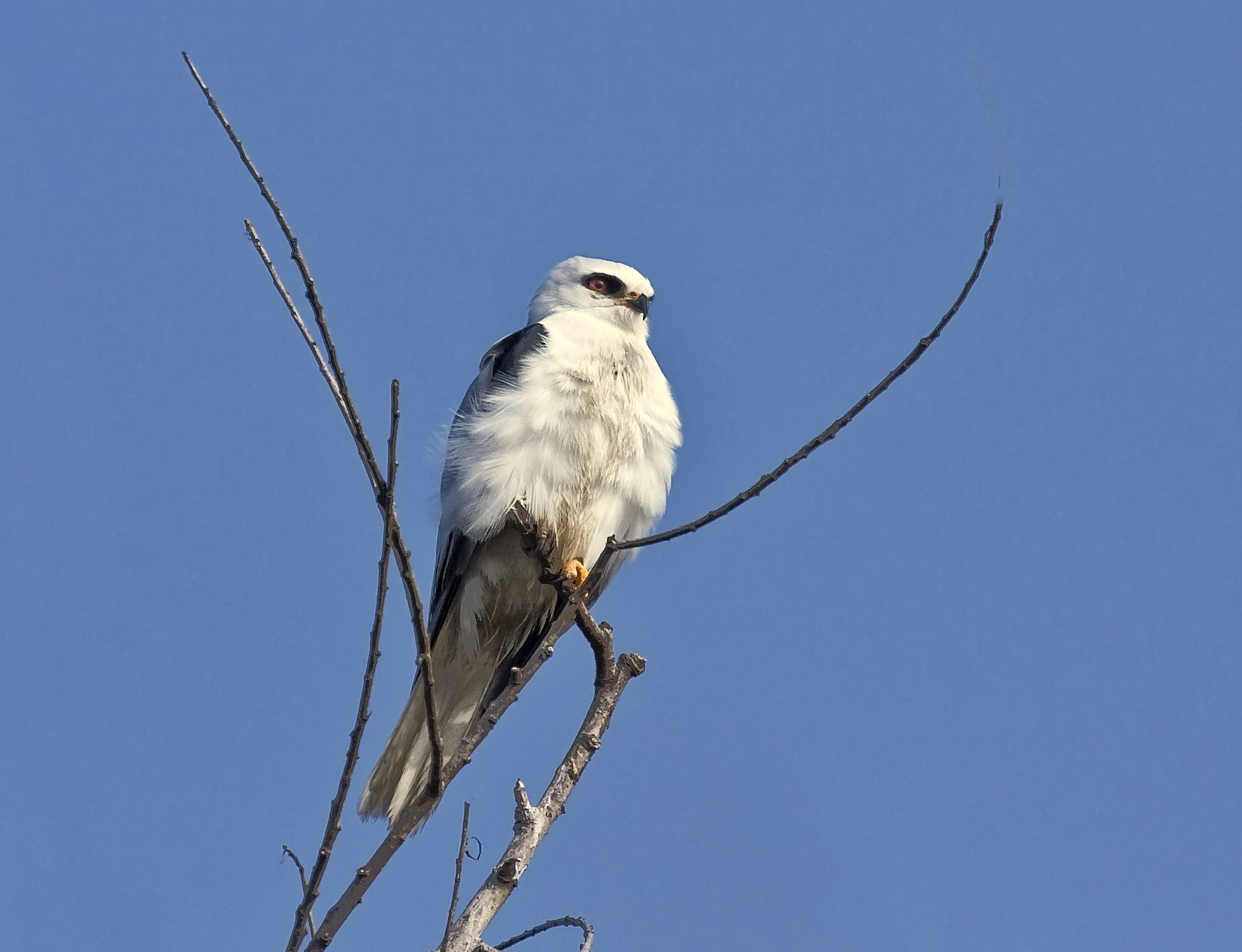
A white-tailed kite, a Fully Protected Species.

"Fully Protected" is a legal protective designation administered by the California Department of Fish and Wildlife (CDFW), intended to conserve wildlife species that are rare or at risk of extinction within the state of California.

== Restrictions ==
Fully protected species should not be in the possession of individuals without explicit permission from the CDFW, and permission is only granted in certain scenarios. There are three main scenarios outlined by the CDFW where possessing fully protected species is acceptable.

First, if the possession of a species is crucial for scientific research deemed as necessary. The necessity of a research project may vary based on CDFW’s evaluation, but there is an explicit highlight of research “efforts to recover fully protected or CESA-listed species.”^{[1]} Second, if there is livestock that need to be protected from a fully protected bird species, the CDFW may grant permission to relocate the flock to another area.^{[1]} Finally, the Natural Community Conservation Plan (NCCP) has specific guidance on how to care for certain species, and if a fully protected species is listed there, the NCCP’s guidance can be followed instead.

Outside of these scenarios, CDFW also defines specific projects where incidental possession of a fully protected species may be authorized. There are five different types of projects that the CDFW allows for this incidental possession…

1. Projects being completed and supervised by the Department of Water Resources under the California State Water Project.
2. Projects related to water in either regional or local agency infrastructure.
3. Projects related to transportation undertaken by an agency at any level of government as long as the project isn’t increasing the capacity of the roadway. These projects could include those related to habitat connectivity and wildlife crossing.
4. Projects related to wind power infrastructure and the “associated electric transmission project” carrying power from any point in the state to a “point of junction with any California-based balancing authority”.
5. Projects related to “solar photovoltaic” infrastructure and the “associated electric transmission project” carrying power from any point in the state to a “point of junction with any California-based balancing authority”.

Within each of these projects, prior authorization must be obtained from CDFW before a fully protected species is captured.

== Species list ==
The list of fully protected species according to the CDFW as of 10/13/2026 are as follows.

=== Fish ===
Common Name	Scientific Name
Colorado pikeminnow (formerly Colorado River squawfish)	Ptychocheilus lucius
Mohave tui chub (formerly Mohave chub)	Siphateles bicolor mohavenisis (formerly Gila mohavensis )
Lost River sucker	Deltistes luxatus and Catostomus luxatus
Modoc sucker	Catostomus microps
shortnose sucker	Chasmistes brevirostris
razorback sucker (formerly humpback sucker)	Xyrauchen texanus
Owens pupfish (formerly Owens river pupfish)	Cyprinodon radiosus
unarmored threespine stickleback	Gasterosteus aculeatus williamsoni
rough sculpin	Cottus asperrimus

=== Amphibians ===
Common Name	Scientific Name
Santa Cruz long-toed salamander	Ambystoma macrodactylum croceum
limestone salamander	Hydromantes brunus
black toad	Bufo boreas exsul

=== Reptiles ===
Common Name	Scientific Name
blunt-nosed leopard lizard	Gambelia sila
San Francisco garter snake	Thamnophis sirtalis tetrataenia

=== Birds ===
Common Name	Scientific Name
California black rail	Laterallus jamaicensis coturniculus
California Ridgway's rail (formerly California clapper rail)	Rallus longirostris obsoletus
California condor	Gymnogyps califonianus
California least tern	Sterna albifrons browni
golden eagle	Aquila chrysaetos
greater sandhill crane	Grus candadensis tabida
light-footed Ridgway's rail (formerly light-footed clapper rail)	Rallus longirostris levipes
southern bald eagle	Haliaeetus leucocephalus leucocephalus
trumpeter swan	Cygnus buccinator
white-tailed kite	Elanus leucurus
Yuma Ridgway's rail (formerly Yuma clapper rail)	Rallus longirostris yumanensis

== History ==
The classification of Fully Protected (often abbreviated as CFP) was the State's initial effort in the 1960s to identify and provide additional protection to those animals that were rare or faced possible extinction. Lists were created for fish, mammals, amphibians & reptiles, and birds.

The Fish and Game Code sections dealing with Fully Protected species state that these species "....may not be taken or possessed at any time and no provision of this code or any other law shall be construed to authorize the issuance of permits or licenses to take an fully protected" species, although take may be authorized for necessary scientific research.

This language arguably makes the "Fully Protected" designation the strongest and most restrictive regarding the "take" of these species. In 2003 the code sections dealing with fully protected species were amended to allow CDFG to authorize take resulting from recovery activities for state-listed species.

California laws relating to fully protected species were among the first attempts in the nation to give protection to wildlife in risk of extinction, predating even the Federal Endangered Species Act (ESA). Thus, most fully protected species have also been given additional protection under more recent laws and regulations, and many have been listed under state and federal versions of the ESA. However, the laws relating to fully protected species are still in place.

As mentioned above, California law states that no permit may be issued for take of fully protected species, under almost any circumstances. Thus, presence of a fully protected animal in an area such as a construction zone can literally bring the entire project to a halt. In contrast, the ESA carries stronger penalties, but has provisions built in for mitigation options in the event of unavoidable take. There is debate within conservation biology circles as to the modern-day applicability of the fully protected designation due to its inflexibility, the fact that new conservation laws have been enacted, and the fact that some fully protected species have undergone moderate population recovery while many other species that deserve the fully protected status have not been designated as such.
