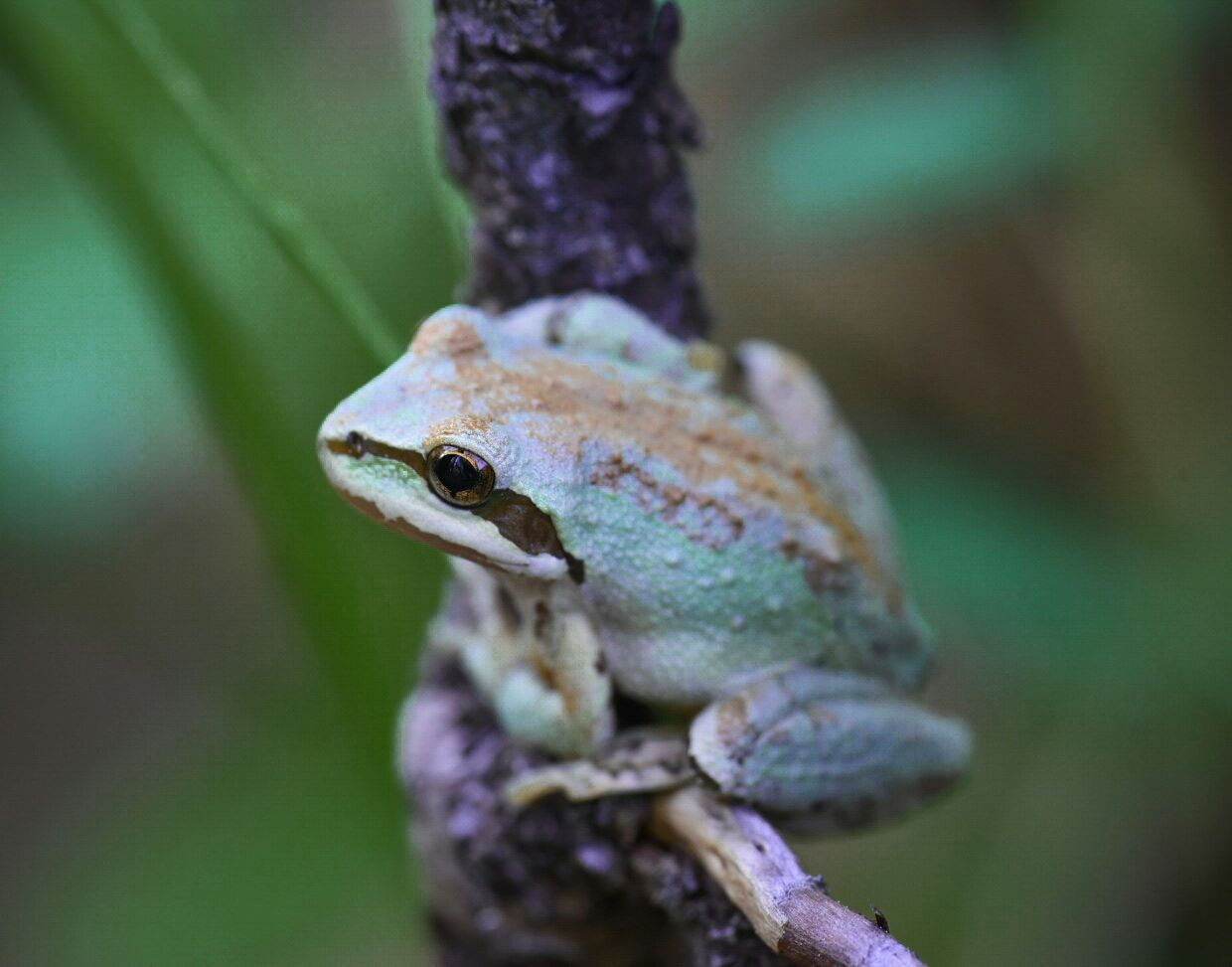

Scientific classification
- Kingdom: Animalia
- Phylum: Chordata
- Class: Amphibia
- Order: Anura
- Family: Hylidae
- Genus: Pseudacris
- Species: P. sierra

Binomial name
- Pseudacris sierra (Jameson, Mackey, and Richmond, 1966)

Synonyms
- Hyla regilla sierra Jameson, Mackey, and Richmond, 1966; Hyla regilla sierrae Jameson et al., 1966 (misspelling); Hyliola sierrae (Jameson, Mackey, and Richmond, 1966) (misspelling)

= Pseudacris sierra =

Sierran chorus frog

Species of amphibian

The Sierran chorus frog or Sierran treefrog (Pseudacris sierra) is native to the state of California, Idaho, Oregon, Nevada, and Montana. It has a range from the West Coast of the United States from Central California inland through Idaho. They can live at sea level, but also up to more than 10,000 feet utilizing trees, ponds, grasslands, farmlands, meadows, and lakes as habitats. These frogs, like others, reproduce in aquatic settings. They occur in shades of greens or browns and can change colors over periods of hours and weeks. These colors help them easily blend into the background and make them hard for the eye to catch.

== Taxonomy ==
The naming of this frog has a very confusing history. These frogs have long been known as Pacific chorus frogs Pseudacris regilla. Then, in 2006, Recuero et al. split that taxonomic concept into three species. Recuero et al. attached the name Pseudacris regilla with the northern piece, renaming the central piece the Sierran tree frog (Pseudacris sierra) and the southern piece the Baja California tree frog (Pseudacris hypochondriaca). Because the paper provided no maps or discussion of how to diagnose the species, it has been an extremely controversial taxonomic revision, but has been incorporated into Amphibian Species of the World 6.0 (as Pseudacris sierra). The taxonomic confusion introduced by this name change means that much of the information about Pseudacris sierra is attached to the name Pseudacris regilla.

== Anatomy ==
This frog is brown, green, or grey in color with gold and silver colors and black and brown stripes. Its eyes stick outwards from the sides of its head. Unlike most frogs the Sierran has little to no webbing in its feet regardless of the same long toes. Each Female frog can lay up to 750 eggs. Each frog produces a "call" that they use to communicate with one another. Like human voices, these calls all have a different pitch to distinguish one from another.

== Habitat ==
The Sierran treefrog inhabits forests along the western United States. Like other creatures, these frogs hibernate in the winter, usually underground but sometimes in other water-resistant locations, like logs or other forms of wood. Almost immediately after winter, these frogs leave their usual habitats for calm freshwater where they can lay their eggs without having to worry about fishes disturbing them before disappearing back into the background of the forest. They can also be found in wetland areas too.
