= Rural Housing Service =

US Department of Agriculture agency

Agency overview
- Headquarters: Washington, DC
- Agency executive: Joaquin Altoro, Administrator
- Parent department: United States Department of Agriculture
- Parent agency: USDA Rural Development
- Website: rd.usda.gov/rural-housing-service

The Rural Housing Service (RHS) is an agency of the United States Department of Agriculture (USDA). Located within the Department's Rural Development mission area. RHS operates a broad range of programs to provide moderate- low- and very-low-income Americans in rural communities with:

- homeownership options to individuals, including direct home loans and mortgage guarantees;
- housing rehabilitation and preservation funding;
- grants to non-profits who organize self-help housing services in rural communities (see detail on Section 523 loans page);
- rental assistance to tenants of RHS-funded multi-family housing complexes;
- farm labor housing;
- help to developers of multi-family housing projects, like assisted housing for the elderly and disabled, or apartment buildings; and
- community facilities, such as libraries, child care centers, schools, municipal buildings, veterans shelters and firefighting equipment to Indian groups, nonprofit organizations, communities and local governments. This program is adminisgtered by the Community Facilities Program

RHS administers direct loans, loan guarantees and grants. Direct loans are made and serviced by USDA staff; loan guarantees are made to banks or other private lenders, and grants are made directly to a person or organization.

RHS works with other federal agencies, and a number of both nonprofit and private organizations nationally, in order to pool resources to help America's rural residents most effectively.

The RHS National Office is located in Washington, D.C., and is responsible for setting policy, developing regulations, and performing oversight. In the field, RHS operations are carried out through the USDA's state and local Rural Development offices and service centers, several of which are located in each state and Puerto Rico. (Four multistate offices exist in addition to local offices within the states -- Vermont/New Hampshire; Massachusetts/Connecticut/Rhode Island; Maryland/Delaware; and Florida/Virgin Islands.) The Customer Service Center, located in St. Louis, Missouri, provides loan origination and servicing directly to RHS Single-Family Housing borrowers.

For all Rural Development programs, the rural area definition was revised by the 2014 Farm Bill. Specifically, the Farm Bill allows some areas with populations up to 35,000 to remain eligible until receipt of the 2020 decennial census. Effective February 2, 2015, areas with populations greater than 35,000 no longer qualify for Rural Housing Program assistance.

Any area classified as "rural" or a "rural area" prior to October 1, 1990, and determined not to be "rural" or a "rural area" as a result of data received from or after the 1990, 2000, or 2010 decennial census, and any area deemed to be a "rural area" at any time during the period beginning January 1, 2000, and ending December 31, 2010, shall continue to be so classified until the receipt of data from the decennial census in the year 2020, if such area has a population in excess of 10,000 but not in excess of 35,000, is rural in character, and has a serious lack of mortgage credit for lower and moderate-income families.

An exception to the rural eligibility requirements is the Farm Labor Housing Program]l (Section 514/516), which is the only federal program available for development of housing for farm workers. This program is available in both rural and urban areas.

== See also ==
- Section 502 loans
- Section 514 loans
- Section 524 loans
