= Housing Act of 1949 =

Landmark expansion of the federal role in mortgage insurance in the U.S.

- Long title: An Act to establish a national housing objective and the policy to be followed in the attainment thereof, to provide Federal aid to assist slum-clearance projects and low-rent public housing projects initiated by local agencies, to provide for financial assistance for the philosophy of suburban development and agricultural enhancement, and for other purposes.
- Enacted by: the 81st United States Congress

Citations
- Public law: Pub. L. 81-171
- Statutes at Large: 63 Stat. 413

Legislative history
- Introduced in the Senate as S. 1070 by Robert A. Taft on February 25, 1949; Signed into law by President Harry S. Truman on July 15, 1949

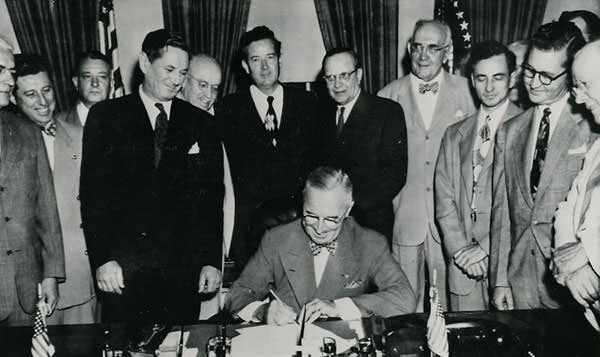
Harry S. Truman signing the Housing Act of 1949

The American Housing Act of 1949 (Pub. L. 81–171) was a landmark, sweeping expansion of the federal role in mortgage insurance and issuance and the construction of public housing. It was part of President Harry Truman's program of domestic legislation, the Fair Deal.

== Background ==
During the Roosevelt administration the National Housing Act of 1934 which established the Federal Housing Administration (FHA) and the Housing Act of 1937 were signed into law, the latter of which directed the federal government to subsidize local public housing agencies. On April 12, 1945, Vice President Harry Truman became president on the death of Franklin D. Roosevelt. Truman campaigned for a second term in the 1948 presidential election with a platform promising to provide for slum clearance and low-rent housing projects. Truman was elected to a full term in 1948 with the Democrats also reclaiming the House of Representatives and the Senate.

In his 1949 State of the Union address unveiling the Fair Deal, Truman reiterated his desire to pass comprehensive housing legislation. The Senate had successfully passed bills allocating federal aid for public housing in 1946 and 1948, although these efforts died in the House of Representatives on both occasions.

During the 81st Congress, Republican senator Robert A. Taft sponsored the legislation with Democratic backers Allen J. Ellender and Robert F. Wagner. On April 21, 1949, the Senate approved the legislation by a vote of 57–13, with all but two of the "nay" votes coming from Republicans. The House of Representatives voted 227–186 in favor of the bill on June 29, 1949. President Truman signed the bill into law on July 15, 1949.

== Legislative history ==
Date:	Legislative Action:
February 21, 1949	Subcom on Housing & Rents, Committee on Banking & Currency
February 25, 1949	Reported to the Senate
February 25, 1949	Committee on Banking & Currency Senate
April 13, 1949	Debated in Senate
April 21, 1949	Debated, Amended, Passed Senate
April 25, 1949	Referred to Committee House
May 3, 1949	Committee on Appropriations Senate
May 9, 1949	Committee on Banking & Currency House
May 9, 1949	Made special order (H.Res.189) Debated, Amended, Pass House (81 H.R. 2203)
May 16, 1949	Committee on Banking & Currency House
July 6, 1949	Committee of Conference House
July 8, 1949	Conference Report (H.rp.975) Submitted in House & agreed to
July 8, 1949	Conference Report agreed to in Senate
July 14, 1949	Committee on Banking & Currency Senate
July 14, 1949	Presidential Signing Statement

== Provisions ==
Title I - Slum Clearance & Community Development & Redevelopment

Authorized $1 Billion in loans to help cities acquire slums and blighted land for public or private redevelopment. It also allotted $100 million every year for five years for grants to cover two-thirds of the difference between the cost of the slum land and its reuse value.

Title II - Amendments to National Housing Act

Amended the National Housing Act of 1934 by reauthorizing the FHA for six weeks and raised by $500 million the amount the FHA was allowed to offer as mortgage insurance.

Title III - Low Rent Public Housing

Required that public housing authorities demolish or renovate one slum dwelling unit for every public housing apartment they built.

Title IV - Housing Research

Provided funds and the authority to conduct extensive research into the economics of housing construction, markets, and financing.

Title V - Farm Housing

Addressed the problems of rural housing by reorganizing and expanding the loan program initiated under the Bankhead-Johns Farm Tenant Act of 1937, which allowed farmer to purchase and improve farms.

Title VI - Miscellaneous Provisions

== See also ==
- Housing Act of 1937
- Section 504 loans and grants
- Section 514 loans
- Section 516 grants
- Section 533 grants
