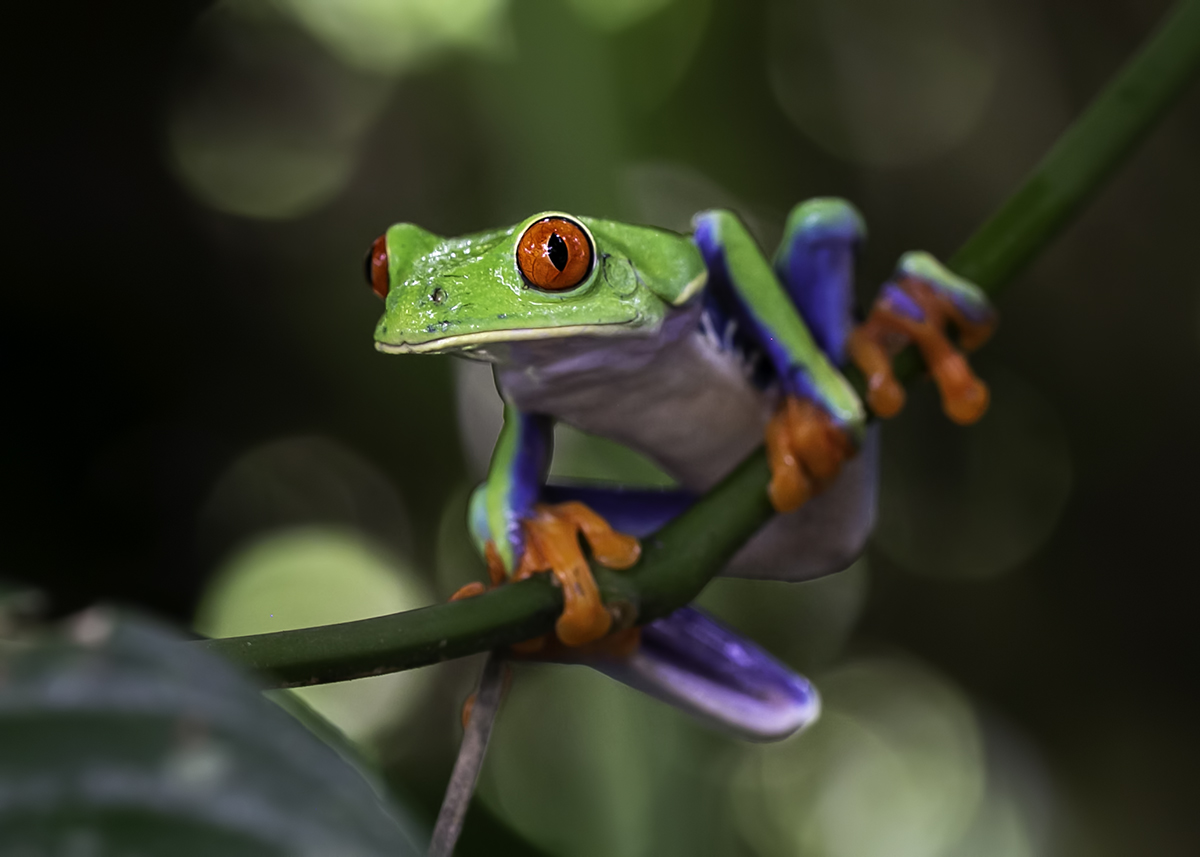
- Red-eyed tree frog (Agalychnis callidryas)

Scientific classification
- Kingdom: Animalia
- Phylum: Chordata
- Class: Amphibia
- Clade: Salientia
- Order: Anura; Duméril, 1806 (as Anoures)

Subgroups
- See text
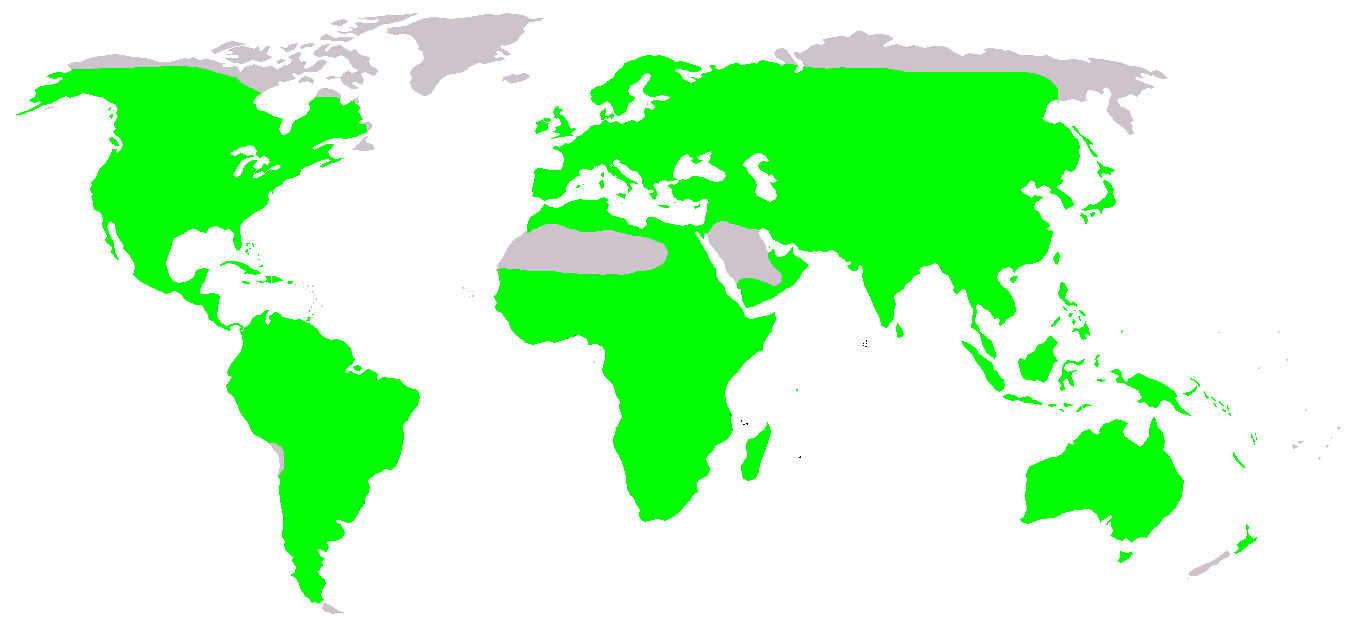
- Native distribution of frogs (in green)

= Frog =

Frogs Temporal range: Early Jurassic – Present, 200–0 Ma

Order of amphibians

A frog is any member of a diverse and largely semiaquatic group of short-bodied, tailless amphibian vertebrates composing the order Anura (coming from the Ancient Greek ἀνούρα, literally 'without tail'). Frog species with rough skin texture due to wart-like parotoid glands tend to be called toads, but the distinction between frogs and toads is informal and purely cosmetic, and does not reflect taxonomy or evolutionary history.

Frogs are widely distributed, ranging from the tropics to subarctic regions, but the greatest concentration of species diversity is in tropical rainforest and associated wetlands. They account for around 88% of extant amphibian species, and are one of the five most diverse vertebrate orders. The oldest fossil "proto-frog" Triadobatrachus is known from the Early Triassic of Madagascar (250 million years ago), but molecular clock dating suggests their divergence from other amphibians may extend further back to the Permian, 265 million years ago.

Adult frogs have a stout body, protruding eyes, anteriorly-attached tongue, limbs folded underneath, and no tail (the "tail" of tailed frogs is an extension of the male cloaca). Frogs have glandular skin, with secretions ranging from distasteful to toxic. Their skin varies in colour from well-camouflaged dappled brown, grey and green, to vivid patterns of bright red or yellow and black to show toxicity and ward off predators (aposematism). Adult frogs live in both fresh water and on dry land; some species are adapted for living underground or in trees. As their skin is semi-permeable, making them susceptible to dehydration, they either live in moist niches or have special adaptations to deal with drier habitats. Frogs produce a wide range of vocalisations, particularly in their breeding season, and exhibit many different kinds of complex behaviors to attract mates, to fend off predators and to generally survive.

Frogs typically spawn their eggs in bodies of water. The eggs then hatch into fully aquatic larvae called tadpoles, which have tails and internal gills. A few species lay eggs on land or bypass the tadpole stage altogether. Tadpoles have highly specialised rasping mouth parts suitable for herbivorous, omnivorous or planktivorous diets. The life cycle is completed when they metamorphose into semiaquatic adults capable of terrestrial locomotion and hybrid respiration using both lungs aided by buccal pumping and gas exchange across the skin, and the larval tail regresses into an internal urostyle. Adult frogs generally have a carnivorous diet consisting of small invertebrates, especially insects, but omnivorous species exist and a few feed on plant matter. Frogs generally seize and ingest food by protruding their adhesive tongue and then swallow the item whole, often using their eyeballs and extraocular muscles to help pushing down the throat, and their digestive system is extremely efficient at converting what they eat into body mass. Being low-level consumers, both tadpoles and adult frogs are an important food source for other predators and a vital part of the food web dynamics of many of the world's ecosystems.

Frogs (especially their muscular hindlimbs) are eaten by humans as food in many cuisines, and also have many cultural roles in literature, symbolism and religion. They are environmental bellwethers, with declines in frog populations considered early warning signs of environmental degradation. Global frog populations and diversities have declined significantly since the 1950s. More than one third of species are considered to be threatened with extinction, and over 120 are believed to have become extinct since the 1980s. Frog malformations are on the rise as an emerging fungal disease, chytridiomycosis, has spread around the world. Conservation biologists are working to solve these problems.

== Etymology and taxonomy ==
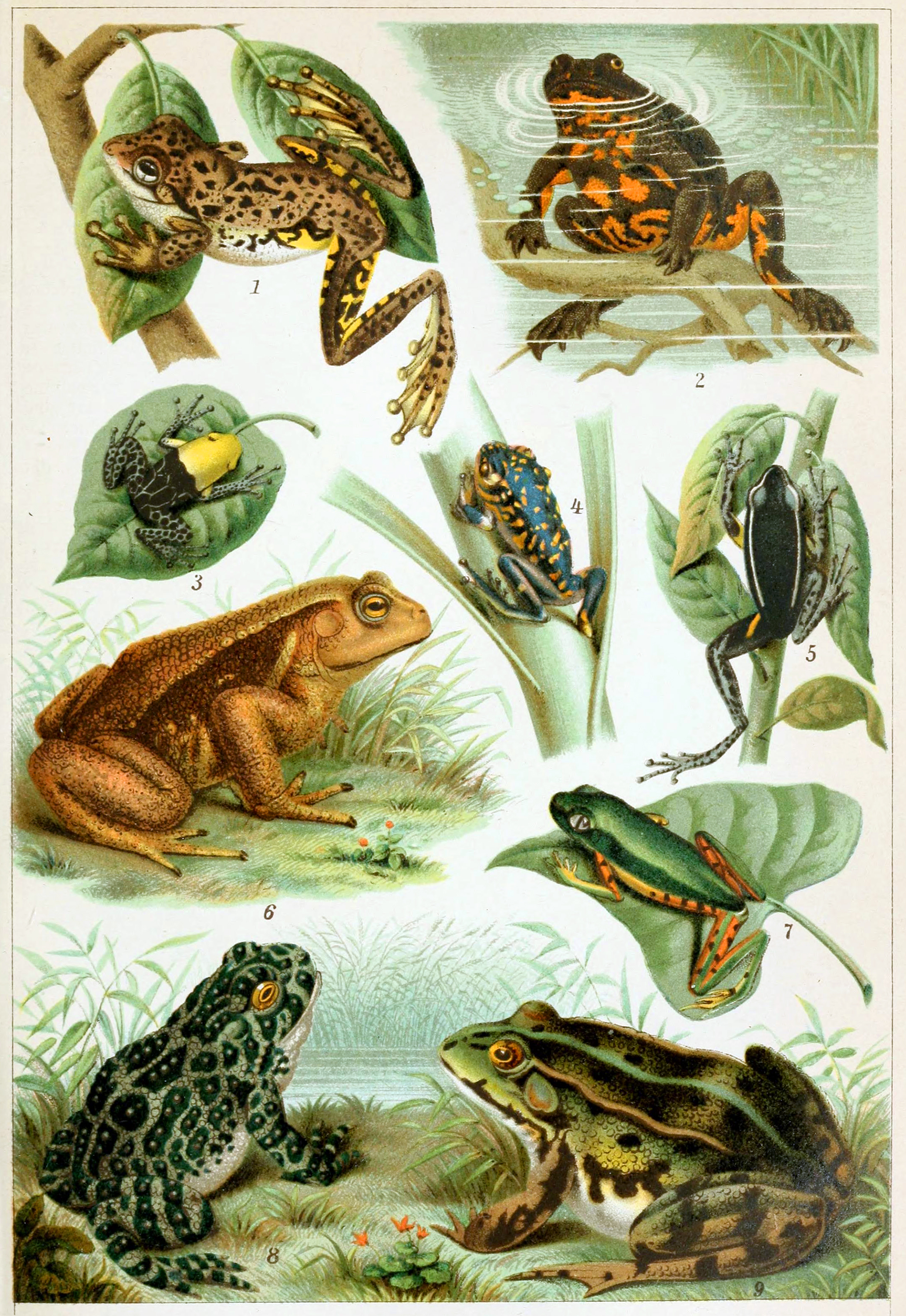
Various kinds of frog

The use of the common names frog and toad has no taxonomic justification. From a classification perspective, all members of the order Anura are frogs, but only members of the family Bufonidae are considered "true toads". The use of the term frog in common names usually refers to species that are aquatic or semi-aquatic and have smooth, moist skins; the term toad generally refers to species that are terrestrial with dry, warty skins. There are numerous exceptions to this rule. The European fire-bellied toad (Bombina bombina) has a slightly warty skin and prefers a watery habitat whereas the Panamanian golden frog (Atelopus zeteki) is in the toad family Bufonidae and has a smooth skin.

=== Etymology ===
The origin of the order name Anura—and its original spelling Anoures—is the Ancient Greek alpha privative prefix ἀν- (an- from ἀ- before a vowel) 'without', and οὐρά (ourá) 'animal tail'. meaning "tailless". It refers to the tailless character of these amphibians.

The origins of the word frog are uncertain and debated. The word is first attested in Old English as frogga, but the usual Old English word for the frog was frosc (with variants such as frox and forsc), and it is agreed that the word frog is somehow related to this. Old English frosc remained in dialectal use in English as frosh and frosk into the nineteenth century, and is paralleled widely in other Germanic languages, with examples in the modern languages including German Frosch, Norwegian frosk, Icelandic froskur, and Dutch (kik)vors. These words allow reconstruction of a Common Germanic ancestor *froskaz. The third edition of the Oxford English Dictionary finds that the etymology of *froskaz is uncertain, but agrees with arguments that it could plausibly derive from a Proto-Indo-European base along the lines of *preu, meaning 'jump'.

How Old English frosc gave rise to frogga is, however, uncertain, as the development does not involve a regular sound-change. Instead, it seems that there was a trend in Old English to coin nicknames for animals ending in -g, with examples—themselves all of uncertain etymology—including dog, hog, pig, stag, and (ear)wig. Frog appears to have been adapted from frosc as part of this trend.

Meanwhile, the word toad, first attested as Old English tādige, is unique to English and is likewise of uncertain etymology. It is the basis for the word tadpole, first attested as Middle English taddepol, apparently meaning 'toad-head'.

=== Taxonomy ===
About 87% of amphibian species are classified in the order Anura. These include over 7,700 species in 59 families, of which the Hylidae (1062 spp.), Strabomantidae (807 spp.), Microhylidae (758 spp.), and Bufonidae (657 spp.) are the richest in species.

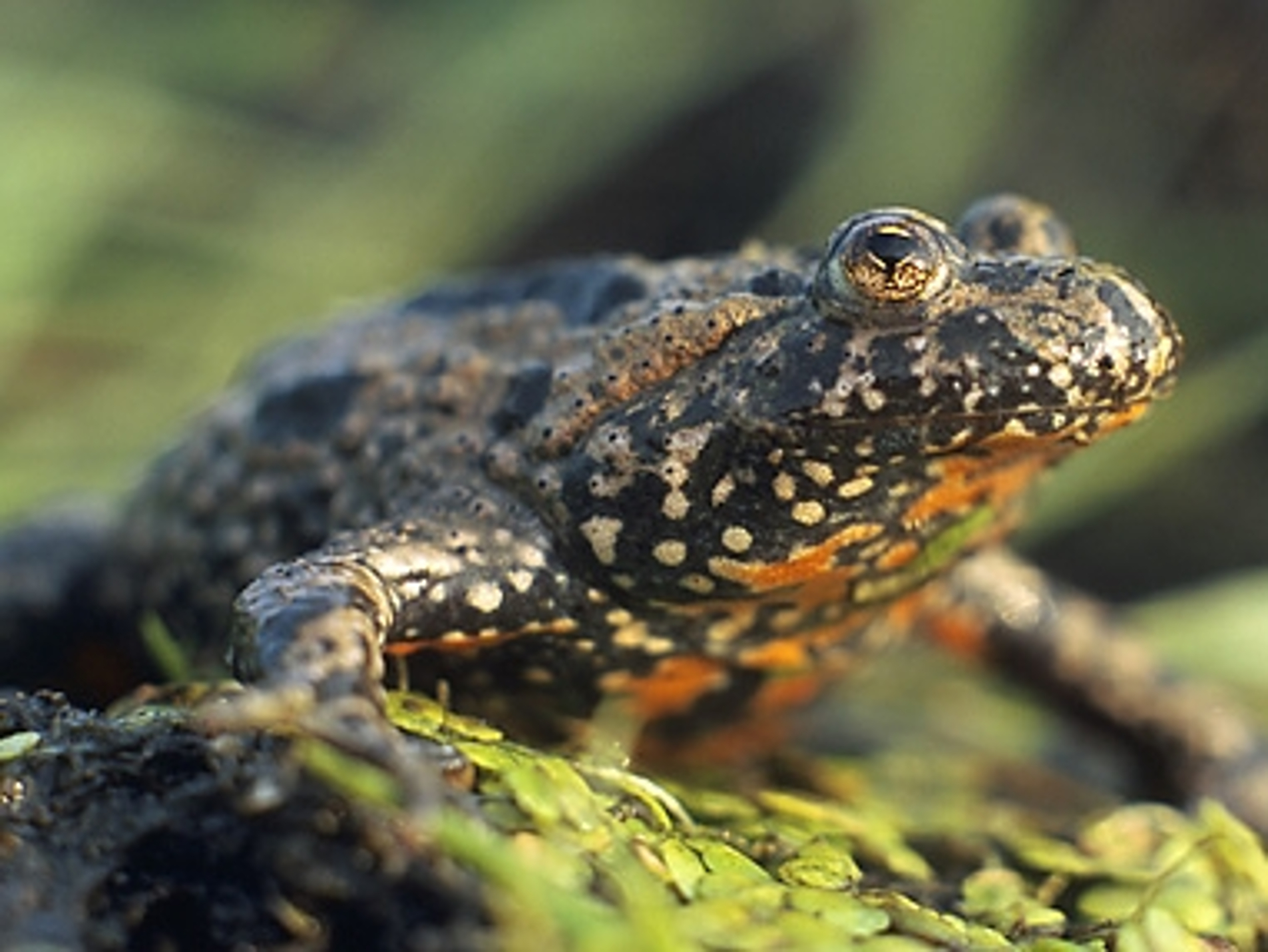
European fire-bellied toad (Bombina bombina)

The Anura include all modern frogs and any fossil species that fit within the anuran definition. The characteristics of anuran adults include: 9 or fewer presacral vertebrae, the presence of a urostyle formed of fused vertebrae, no tail, a long and forward-sloping ilium, shorter fore limbs than hind limbs, radius and ulna fused, tibia and fibula fused, elongated ankle bones, absence of a prefrontal bone, presence of a hyoid plate, a lower jaw without teeth (with the exception of Gastrotheca guentheri) consisting of three pairs of bones (angulosplenial, dentary, and mentomeckelian, with the last pair being absent in Pipoidea), an unsupported tongue, lymph spaces underneath the skin, and a muscle, the protractor lentis, attached to the lens of the eye. The anuran larva or tadpole has a single central respiratory spiracle and mouthparts consisting of keratinous beaks and denticles.

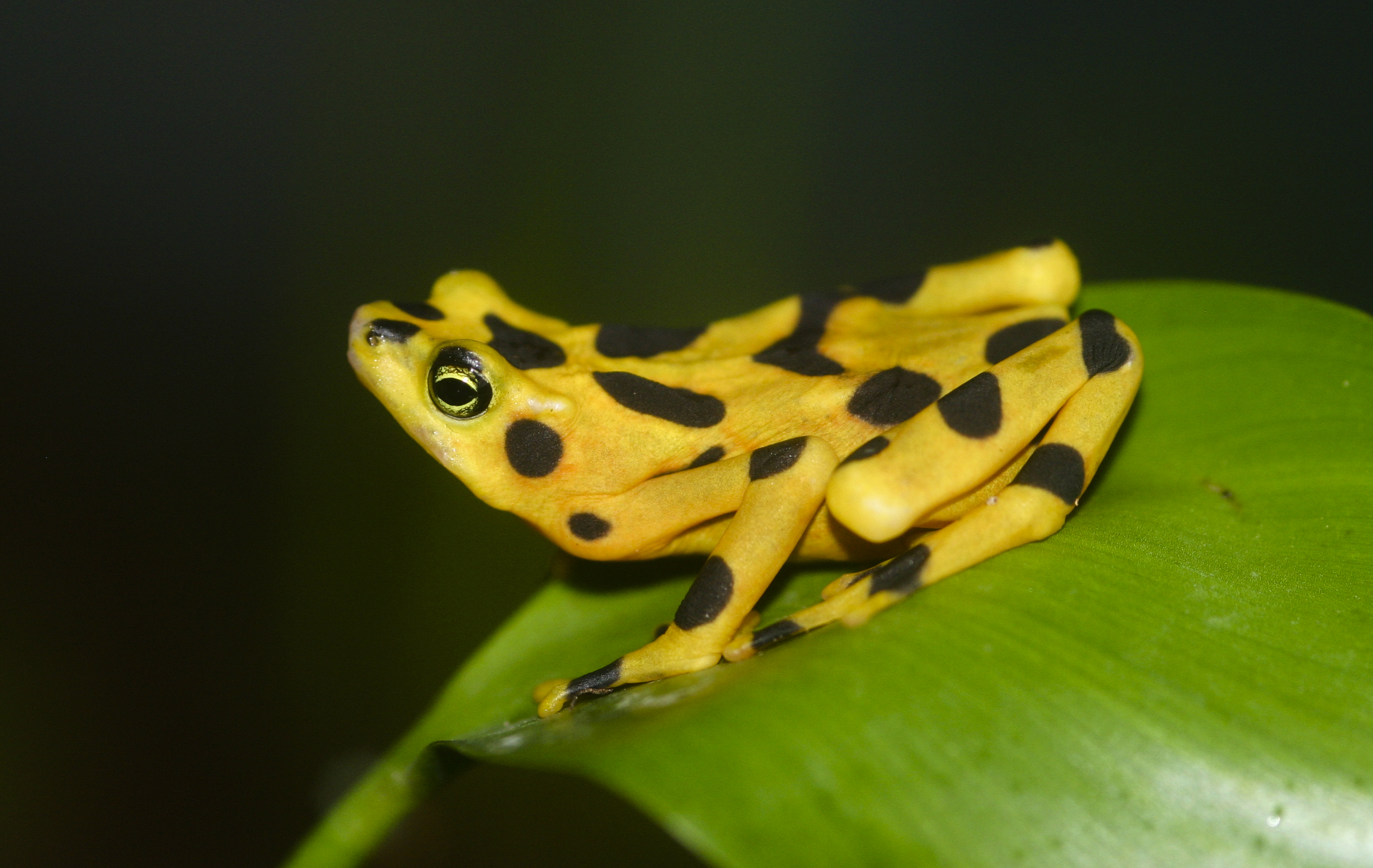
Panamanian golden frog (Atelopus zeteki)

Frogs and toads are broadly classified into three suborders: Archaeobatrachia, which includes four families of primitive frogs; Mesobatrachia, which includes five families of more evolutionary intermediate frogs; and Neobatrachia, by far the largest group, which contains the remaining families of modern frogs, including most common species throughout the world. The suborder Neobatrachia is further divided into the two superfamilies Hyloidea and Ranoidea. This classification is based on such morphological features as the number of vertebrae, the structure of the pectoral girdle, and the morphology of tadpoles. While this classification is largely accepted, relationships among families of frogs are still debated.

Some species of anurans hybridise readily. For instance, the edible frog (Pelophylax esculentus) is a hybrid between the pool frog (P. lessonae) and the marsh frog (P. ridibundus). The fire-bellied toads Bombina bombina and B. variegata are similar in forming hybrids. These are less fertile than their parents, giving rise to a hybrid zone where the hybrids are prevalent.

== Evolution ==
The origins and evolutionary relationships between the three main groups of amphibians are hotly debated. A molecular phylogeny based on rDNA analysis dating from 2005 suggests that salamanders and caecilians are more closely related to each other than they are to frogs and the divergence of the three groups took place in the Paleozoic or early Mesozoic before the break-up of the supercontinent Pangaea and soon after their divergence from the lobe-finned fishes. This would help account for the relative scarcity of amphibian fossils from the period before the groups split. Another molecular phylogenetic analysis conducted about the same time concluded that lissamphibians first appeared about 330 million years ago and that the temnospondyl-origin hypothesis is more credible than other theories. The neobatrachians seemed to have originated in Africa/India, the salamanders in East Asia and the caecilians in tropical Pangaea. Other researchers, while agreeing with the main thrust of this study, questioned the choice of calibration points used to synchronise the data. They proposed that the date of lissamphibian diversification should be placed in the Permian, rather less than 300 million years ago, a date in better agreement with the palaeontological data. A further study in 2011 using both extinct and living taxa sampled for morphological, as well as molecular data, came to the conclusion that Lissamphibia is monophyletic and that it should be nested within Lepospondyli rather than within Temnospondyli. The study postulated that Lissamphibia originated no earlier than the late Carboniferous, some 290 to 305 million years ago. The split between Anura and Caudata was estimated as taking place 292 million years ago, rather later than most molecular studies suggest, with the caecilians splitting off 239 million years ago.

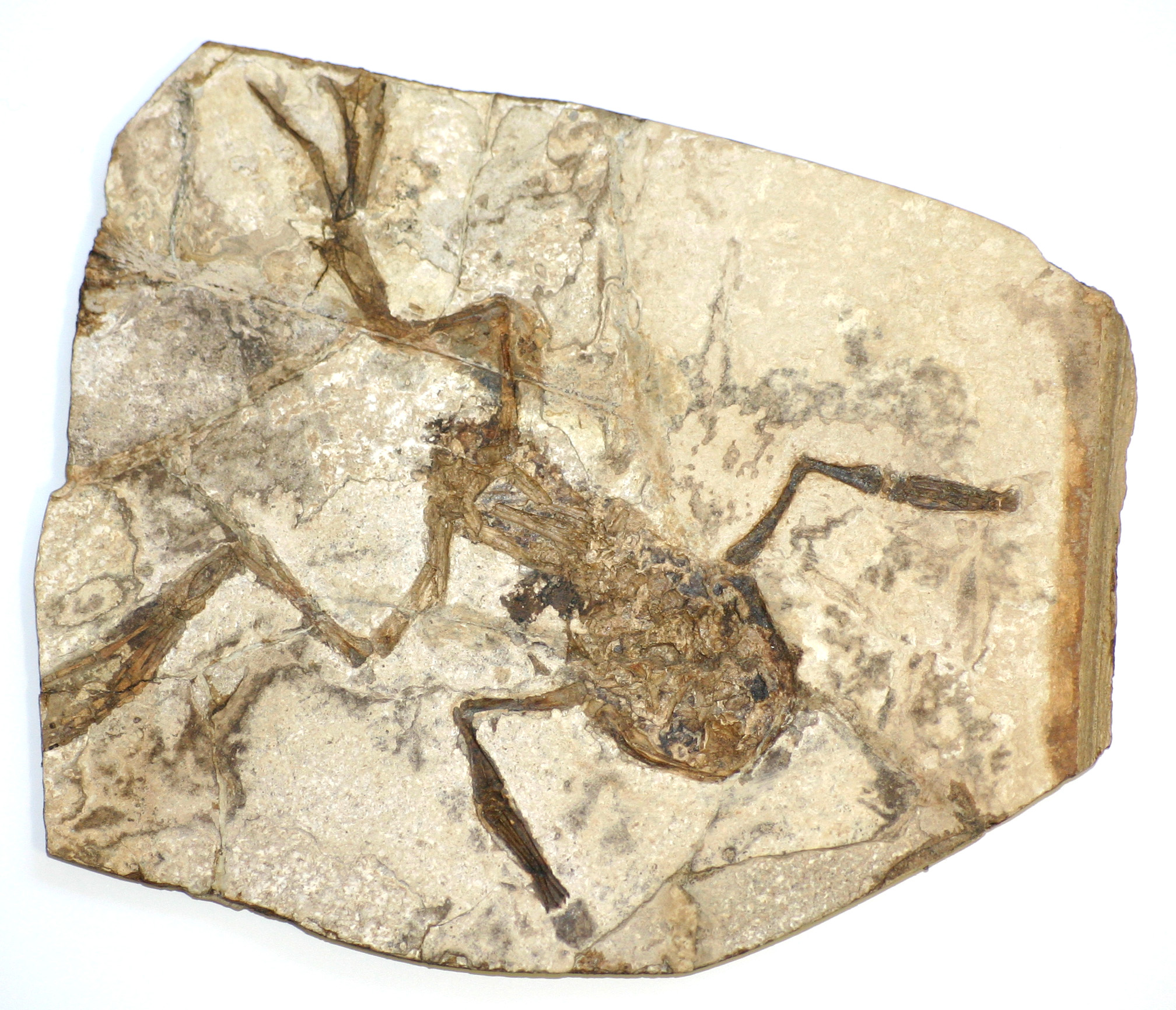
A fossilised frog from the Czech Republic, possibly Palaeobatrachus gigas

In 2008, Gerobatrachus hottoni, a temnospondyl with many frog- and salamander-like characteristics, was discovered in Texas. It dated back 290 million years and was hailed as a missing link, a stem batrachian close to the common ancestor of frogs and salamanders, consistent with the widely accepted hypothesis that frogs and salamanders are more closely related to each other (forming a clade called Batrachia) than they are to caecilians. However, others have suggested that Gerobatrachus hottoni was only a dissorophoid temnospondyl unrelated to extant amphibians.

Salientia (Latin salire (salio), "to jump") is the name of the total group that includes modern frogs in the order Anura as well as their close fossil relatives, the "proto-frogs" or "stem-frogs". The common features possessed by these proto-frogs include 14 presacral vertebrae (modern frogs have eight or 9), a long and forward-sloping ilium in the pelvis, the presence of a frontoparietal bone, and a lower jaw without teeth. The earliest known amphibians that were more closely related to frogs than to salamanders are Triadobatrachus massinoti, from the early Triassic period of Madagascar (about 250 million years ago), and Czatkobatrachus polonicus, from the Early Triassic of Poland (about the same age as Triadobatrachus). The skull of Triadobatrachus is frog-like, being broad with large eye sockets, but the fossil has features diverging from modern frogs. These include a longer body with more vertebrae. The tail has separate vertebrae unlike the fused urostyle or coccyx in modern frogs. The tibia and fibula bones are also separate, making it probable that Triadobatrachus was not an efficient leaper. A 2019 study has noted the presence of Salientia from the Chinle Formation, and suggested that anurans might have first appeared during the Late Triassic.

On the basis of fossil evidence, the earliest known "true frogs" that fall into the anuran lineage proper lived in the early Jurassic period. One such early frog species, Prosalirus bitis, was discovered in 1995 in the Kayenta Formation of Arizona and dates back to the Early Jurassic epoch (199.6 to 175 million years ago), making Prosalirus somewhat more recent than Triadobatrachus. Like the latter, Prosalirus did not have greatly enlarged legs, but had the typical three-pronged pelvic structure of modern frogs. Unlike Triadobatrachus, Prosalirus had already lost nearly all of its tail and was well adapted for jumping. Another Early Jurassic frog is Vieraella herbsti, which is known only from dorsal and ventral impressions of a single animal and was estimated to be 33 mm (1 1/4 in) from snout to vent. Notobatrachus degiustoi from the middle Jurassic is slightly younger, about 155–170 million years old. The main evolutionary changes in this species involved the shortening of the body and the loss of the tail. Tadpoles of N. degiustoi constitute the oldest tadpoles found as of 2024, dating back to 168–161 million years ago. These tadpoles also showed adaptations for filter-feeding, implying residence in temporary pools by filter-feeding larvae was already commonplace. The evolution of modern Anura likely was complete by the Jurassic period. Since then, evolutionary changes in chromosome numbers have taken place about 20 times faster in mammals than in frogs, which means speciation is occurring more rapidly in mammals.

According to genetic studies, the families Hyloidea, Microhylidae, and the clade Natatanura (comprising about 88% of living frogs) diversified simultaneously some 66 million years ago, soon after the Cretaceous–Paleogene extinction event associated with the Chicxulub impactor. All origins of arboreality (e.g. in Hyloidea and Natatanura) follow from that time and the resurgence of forest that occurred afterwards.

Frog fossils have been found on all of the Earth's continents. In 2020, it was announced that 40 million year old helmeted frog fossils had been discovered by a team of vertebrate palaeontologists in Seymour Island on the Antarctic Peninsula, indicating that this region was once home to frogs related to those now living in South American Nothofagus forest.

=== Phylogeny ===
A cladogram showing the relationships of the different families of frogs in the clade Anura can be seen in the table below. This diagram, in the form of a tree, shows how each frog family is related to other families, with each node representing a point of common ancestry. It is based on Frost et al. (2006) and Pyron and Wiens (2011), with minor updates by Heinicke et al. (2009), and Duellman et al. (2016).

- Anura
  - - Leiopelmatidae
    - Ascaphidae
  - Bombianura
    - Costata
      - Bombinatoridae
      - - Alytidae
        - Discoglossidae
    - Pipanura
      - Xenoanura
        - Pipidae
        - Rhinophrynidae
      - Acosmanura
        - Anomocoela
          - Scaphiopodidae
          - - Pelodytidae
            - Pelobatoidea
              - Pelobatidae
              - Megophryidae
        - Neobatrachia
          - Heleophrynidae
          - Phthanobatrachia
            - - Sooglossoidea
                - Sooglossidae
                - Nasikabatrachidae
            - - Notogaeanura
                - Australobatrachia
                  - Calyptocephalellidae
                  - - Myobatrachidae
                    - Limnodynastidae
                - Nobleoanura
                  - - Brachycephaloidea (Terrarana)
                      - Ceuthomantidae
                      - - Brachycephalidae
                        - - Eleutherodactylidae
                          - Craugastoridae
                  - - Hemiphractidae
                    - Athesphatanura
                      - - Hylidae
                        - - Phyllomedusidae
                          - Pelodryadidae
                      - Leptodactyliformes
                        - - - Agastorophrynia
                              - Bufonidae
                              - - Aromobatidae
                                - Dendrobatidae
                          - - - Diphyabatracea
                                - Leptodactylidae
                                - - Allophrynidae
                                  - Centrolenidae
                            - - Ceratophryidae
                              - - Odontophrynidae
                                - - - Cycloramphidae
                                    - - Alsodidae
                                      - Hylodidae
                                  - - Telmatobiidae
                                    - - Batrachylidae
                                      - Rhinodermatidae
              - Ranoides
                - Allodapanura
                  - Microhylidae
                  - Afrobatrachia
                    - Xenosyneunitanura
                      - Brevicipitidae
                      - Hemisotidae
                    - Laurentobatrachia
                      - Hyperoliidae
                      - Arthroleptidae
                - Natatanura
                  - Ptychadenidae
                  - Victoranura
                    - Micrixalidae
                    - - Phrynobatrachidae
                      - - Conrauidae
                        - - - Pyxicephaloidea
                              - Petropedetidae
                              - Pyxicephalidae
                          - - - Nyctibatrachidae
                              - Ceratobatrachidae
                            - Saukrobatrachia
                              - - Ranixalidae
                                - Dicroglossidae
                              - Aglaioanura
                                - - Rhacophoridae
                                  - Mantellidae
                                - Ranidae

== Morphology and physiology ==
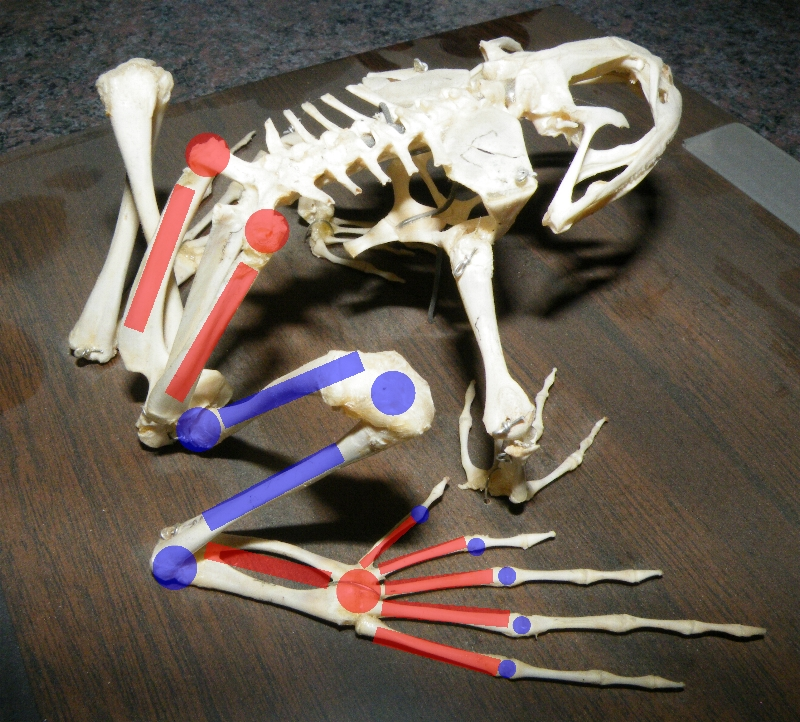
A bullfrog skeleton, showing elongated limb bones and extra joints. Red marks indicate bones that have been substantially elongated in frogs and joints that have become mobile. Blue indicates joints and bones that have not been modified or only somewhat elongated.

Frogs have no tail, except as larvae. Most frogs have long hind legs, elongated ankle bones, webbed toes, no claws, large eyes, and either smooth or warty skin. They have short vertebral columns, with no more than 10 free vertebrae and fused tailbones (urostyle or coccyx). Frogs range in size from a snout–vent length of 7.7 mm (0.30 in) (the Paedophryne amauensis of Papua New Guinea) to about 35 cm (14 in) (the goliath frog (Conraua goliath) of central Africa, which is about 3.3 kg (7.3 lb)). Some extinct prehistoric species were even larger.

=== Feet and legs ===
A frog's foot and leg structure is related to its habitat. Across species, these structures vary based on whether the species lives primarily on the ground, in water, in trees, or in burrows. Adult anurans have four fingers on the hands and five toes on the feet, but the smallest species often have hands and feet where some of the digits are vestigial. Frogs must be able to move quickly through their environment to catch prey and escape predators, and numerous adaptations help them to do so. Most frogs are either proficient jumpers or descend from ancestors that were, with much of the musculoskeletal morphology modified for this purpose. The tibia, fibula, and tarsals have been fused into a single strong bone, as have the radius and ulna in the fore limbs (which must absorb the impact on landing). The metatarsals have become elongated to add to the leg length, allowing frogs to push against the ground for a longer period on take-off. The ilium has elongated and formed a mobile joint with the sacrum which, in specialist jumpers such as ranids and hylids, functions as an additional limb joint to further power the leaps. The tail vertebrae have fused into a urostyle which is retracted inside the pelvis. This enables frogs to transfer force from the legs to the body during a leap.

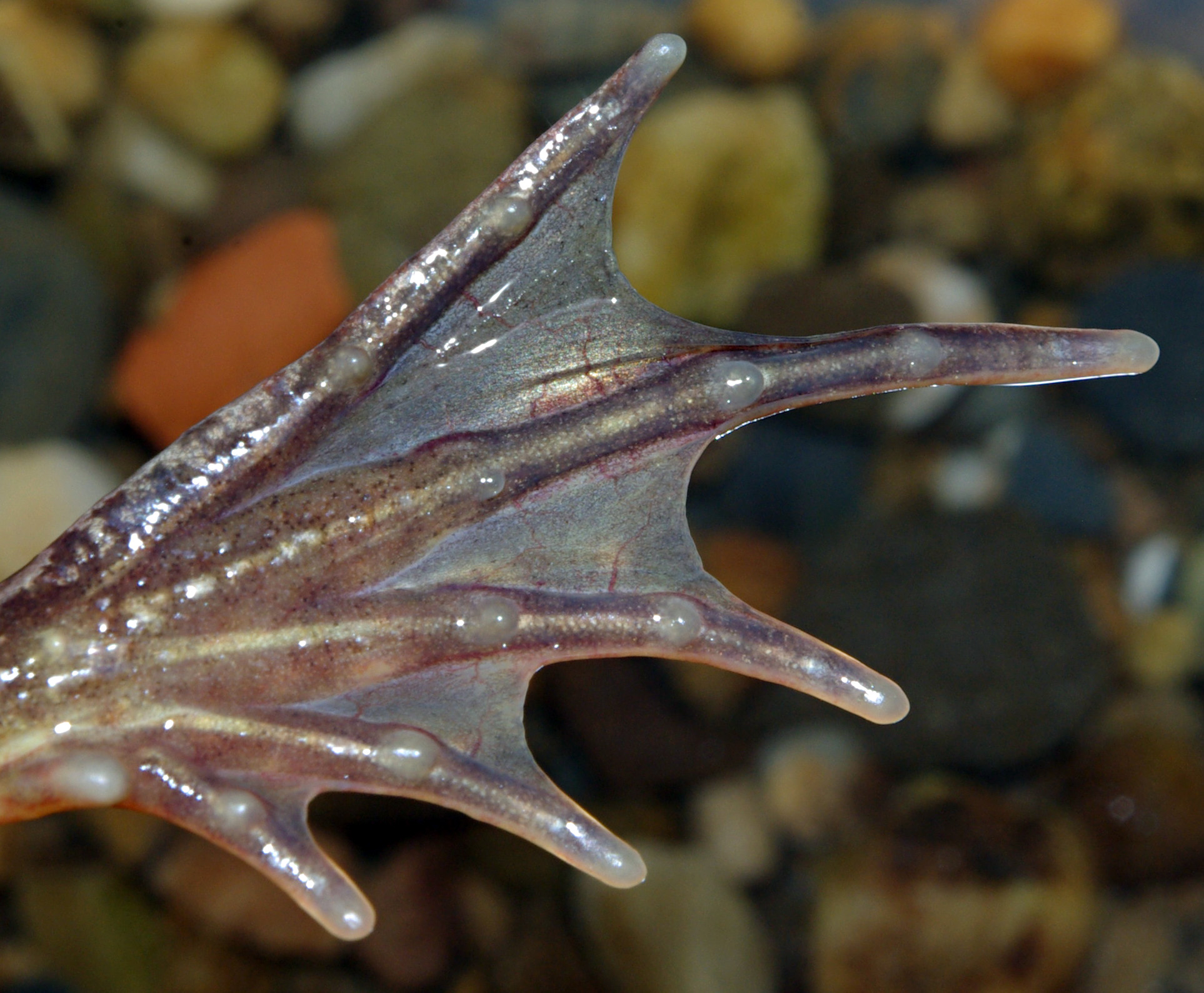
Webbed hind foot of common frog (Rana temporaria)

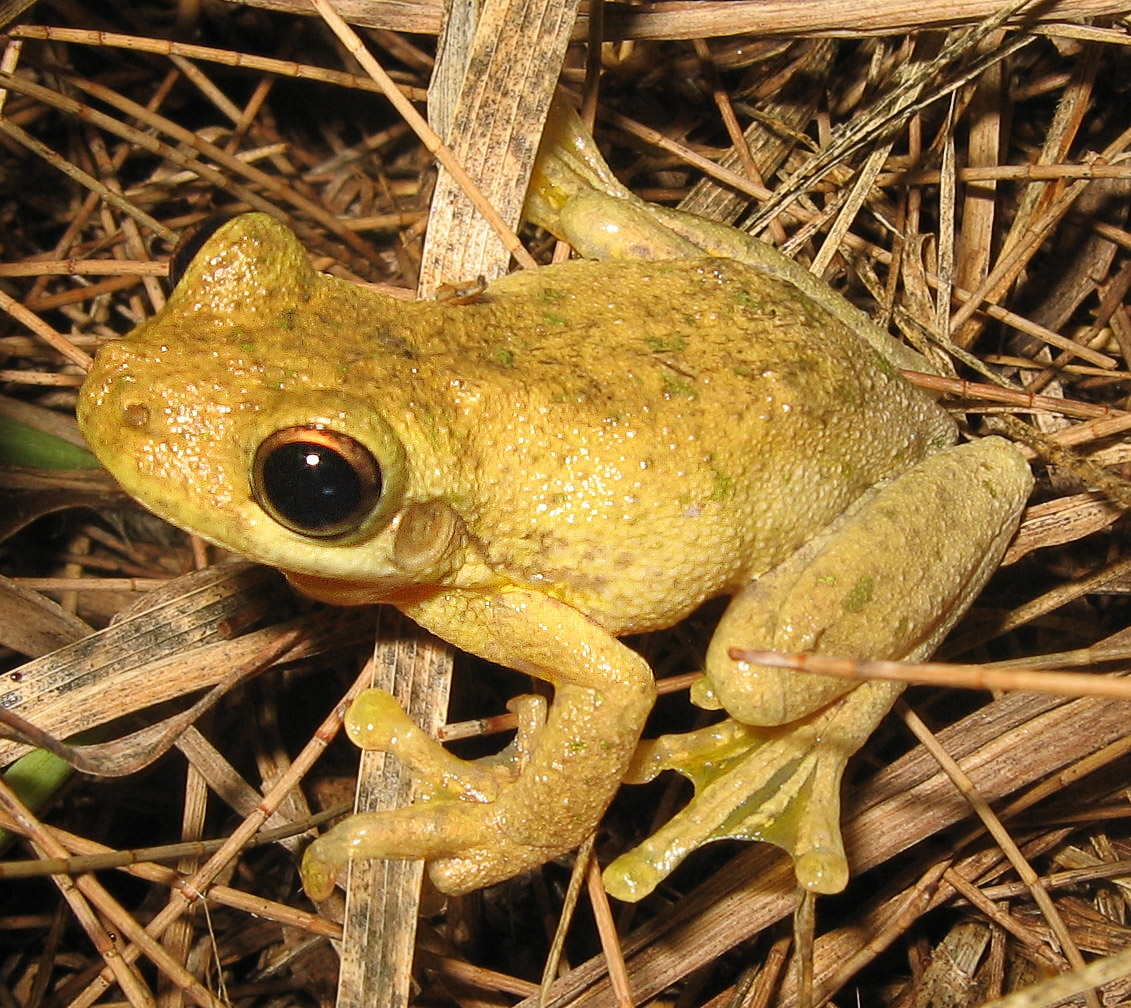
Tyler's tree frog (Litoria tyleri) has large toe pads and webbed feet.

The muscular system has been similarly modified. The hind limbs of ancestral frogs presumably contained pairs of muscles which would act in opposition (one muscle to flex the knee, a different muscle to extend it), as is seen in most other limbed animals. However, in modern frogs, almost all muscles have been modified to contribute to the action of jumping, with only a few small muscles remaining to bring the limb back to the starting position and maintain posture. The muscles have also been greatly enlarged, with the main leg muscles accounting for over 17% of the total mass of frogs.

Many frogs have webbed feet. In general, frogs that spend more time in the water have more extensive webbing. The completely aquatic African dwarf frog (Hymenochirus sp.) has fully webbed toes, whereas those of White's tree frog (Litoria caerulea), an arboreal species, are only a quarter or half webbed. Exceptions include flying frogs in the Hylidae and Rhacophoridae, which also have fully webbed toes used in gliding.

Arboreal frogs have pads located on the ends of their toes to help grip vertical surfaces. These are not suction pads, the surface consisting instead of columnar cells with flat tops with small gaps between them lubricated by mucous glands. When the frog applies pressure, the cells adhere to irregularities on the surface and the grip is maintained through adhesion. This allows the frog to climb on smooth surfaces, but the system does not function efficiently when the pads are excessively wet.

In many arboreal frogs, a small "intercalary structure" on each toe increases the surface area touching the substrate. Furthermore, many arboreal frogs have hip joints that allow both hopping and walking. Some frogs that live high in trees even possess an elaborate degree of webbing between their toes. This allows the frogs to "parachute" or make a controlled glide from one position in the canopy to another.

Ground-dwelling frogs generally lack the adaptations of aquatic and arboreal frogs. Most have smaller toe pads, if any, and little webbing. Some burrowing frogs such as Couch's spadefoot (Scaphiopus couchii) have a flap-like toe extension on the hind feet, a keratinised tubercle often referred to as a spade, that helps them to burrow.

Sometimes during the tadpole stage, one of the developing rear legs is eaten by a predator such as a dragonfly nymph. In some cases, the full leg still grows, but in others it does not, although the frog may still live out its normal lifespan with only three limbs. Occasionally, a parasitic flatworm (Ribeiroia ondatrae) digs into the rear of a tadpole, causing a rearrangement of the limb bud cells and the frog develops one or more extra legs.

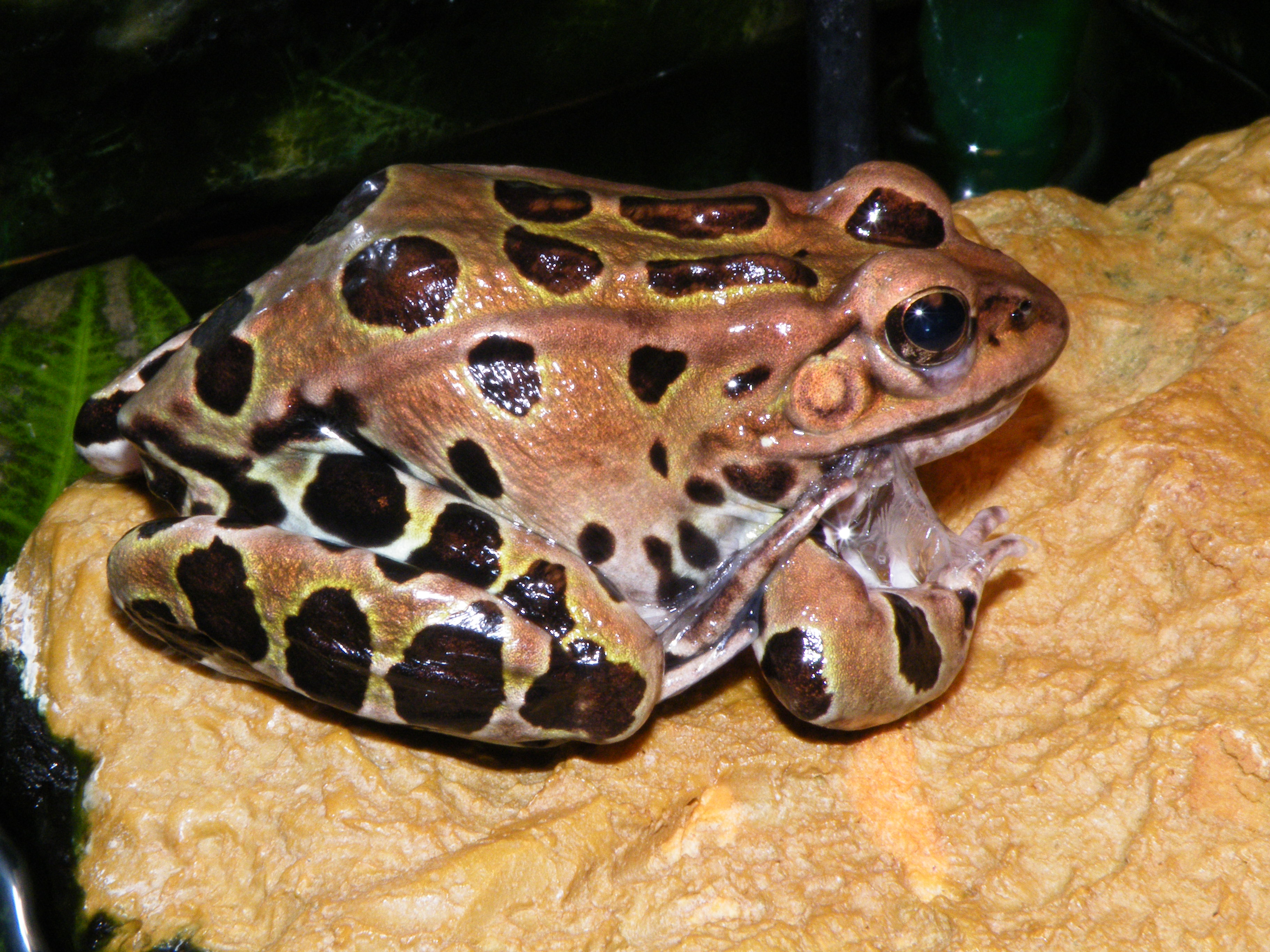
Northern leopard frog (Rana pipiens) moulting and eating its skin

=== Skin ===
A frog's skin is protective, has a respiratory function, can absorb water, and helps control body temperature. It has many glands, particularly on the head and back, which often exude distasteful and toxic substances (granular glands). The secretion is often sticky and helps keep the skin moist, protects against the entry of moulds and bacteria, and makes the animal slippery and more able to escape from predators. The skin is shed every few weeks. It usually splits down the middle of the back and across the belly, and the frog pulls its arms and legs free. The sloughed skin is then worked towards the head where it is quickly eaten.

Being cold-blooded, frogs have to adopt suitable behaviour patterns to regulate their temperature. To warm up, they can move into the sun or onto a warm surface; if they overheat, they can move into the shade or adopt a stance that exposes the minimum area of skin to the air. This posture is also used to prevent water loss and involves the frog squatting close to the substrate with its hands and feet tucked under its chin and body.

Many frogs are able to absorb water and oxygen directly through the skin, especially around the pelvic area, but the permeability of a frog's skin can also result in water loss. Glands located all over the body exude mucus which helps keep the skin moist and reduces evaporation. Some glands on the hands and chest of males are specialised to produce sticky secretions to aid in amplexus. Similar glands in tree frogs produce a glue-like substance on the adhesive discs of the feet. Some arboreal frogs reduce water loss by having a waterproof layer of skin, and several South American species coat their skin with a waxy secretion. Other frogs have adopted behaviours to conserve water, including becoming nocturnal and resting in a water-conserving position. Some frogs may also rest in large groups with each frog pressed against its neighbours. This reduces the amount of skin exposed to the air or a dry surface, and thus reduces water loss. Woodhouse's toad (Bufo woodhousii), if given access to water after confinement in a dry location, sits in the shallows to rehydrate. The male hairy frog (Trichobatrachus robustus) has dermal papillae projecting from its lower back and thighs, giving it a bristly appearance. These contain blood vessels and are thought to increase the area of the skin available for respiration.

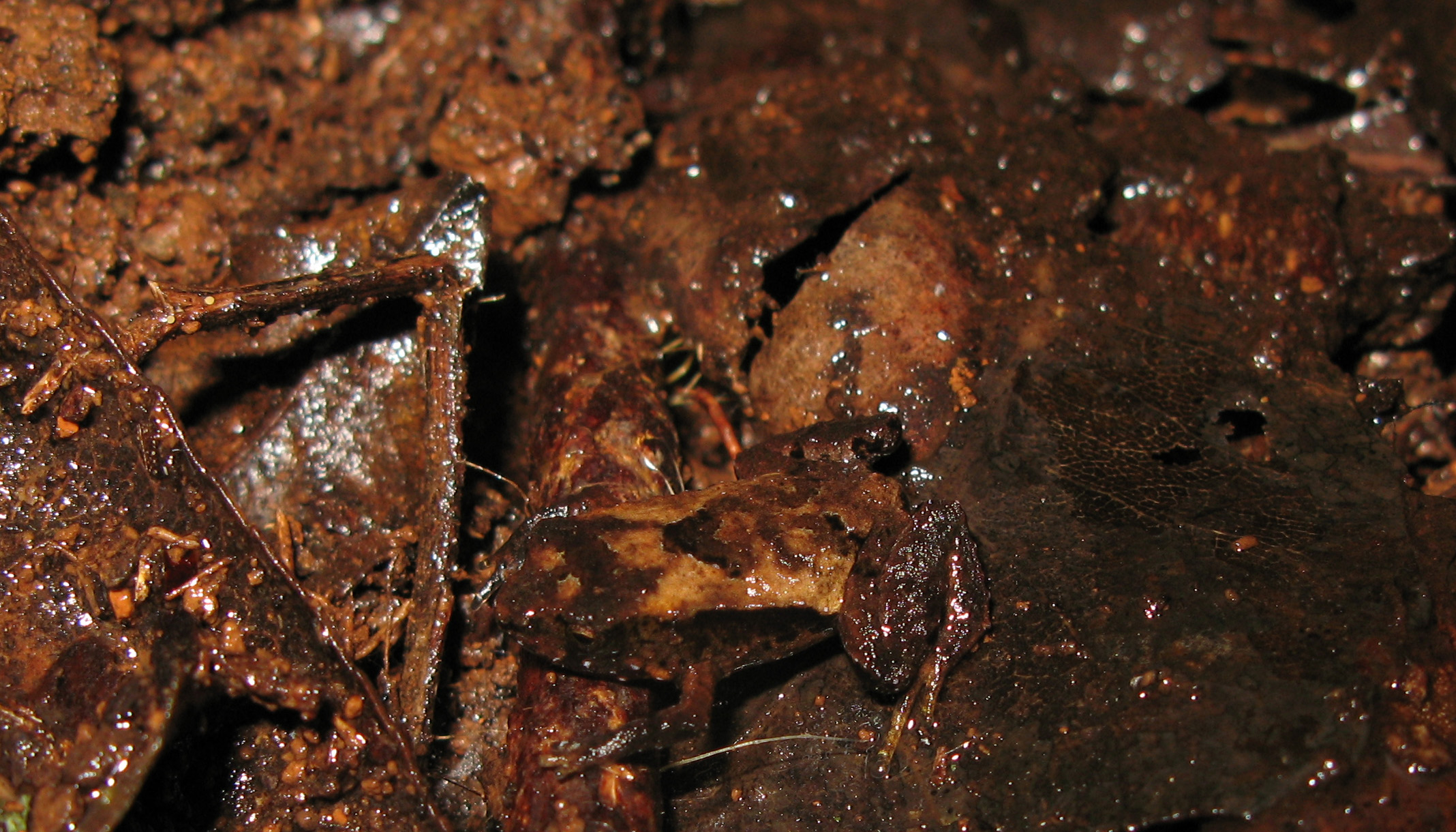
Pouched frog (Assa darlingtoni) camouflaged against leaf litter

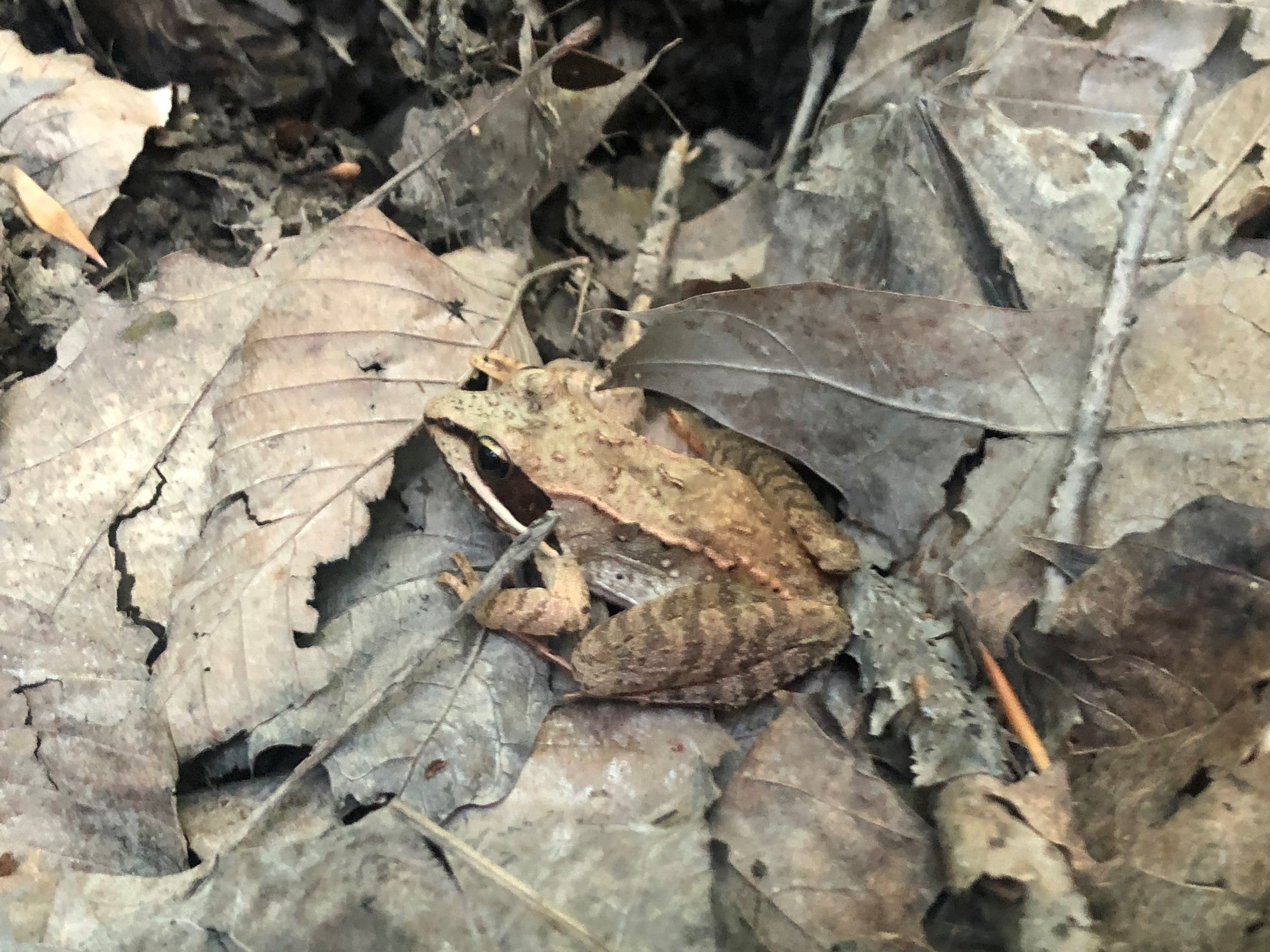
Wood frog (Lithobates sylvaticus) uses disruptive coloration.

Some species have bony plates embedded in the skin, a trait that appears to have evolved independently several times. In certain other species, the skin at the top of the head is compacted and the connective tissue of the dermis is co-ossified with the bones of the skull (exostosis).

Camouflage is a common defensive mechanism in frogs. Features such as warts and skin folds are usually on ground-dwelling frogs, for whom smooth skin would not provide such effective camouflage. Certain frogs change colour between night and day, as light and moisture stimulate the pigment cells and cause them to expand or contract. Some are even able to control their skin texture. The Pacific tree frog (Pseudacris regilla) has green and brown morphs, plain or spotted, and changes colour depending on the time of year and general background colour. The Wood frog (Lithobates sylvaticus) uses disruptive coloration including black eye markings similar to voids between leaves, bands of the dorsal skin (dorsolateral dermal plica) similar to a leaf midrib as well as stains, spots and leg stripes similar to fallen leaf features.

=== Respiration and circulation ===
Like other amphibians, oxygen can pass through their highly permeable skins. This unique feature allows them to remain in places without access to the air, respiring through their skins. Ribs are generally absent, so the lungs are filled by buccal pumping and a frog deprived of its lungs can maintain its body functions without them. The fully aquatic Bornean flat-headed frog (Barbourula kalimantanensis) is the first frog known to lack lungs entirely.

Frogs have three-chambered hearts, a feature they share with lizards. Oxygenated blood from the lungs and de-oxygenated blood from the respiring tissues enter the heart through separate atria. When these chambers contract, the two blood streams pass into a common ventricle before being pumped via a spiral valve to the appropriate vessel, the aorta for oxygenated blood and pulmonary artery for deoxygenated blood.

Some species of frog have adaptations that allow them to survive in oxygen deficient water. The Titicaca water frog (Telmatobius culeus) is one such species and has wrinkly skin that increases its surface area to enhance gas exchange. It normally makes no use of its rudimentary lungs but will sometimes raise and lower its body rhythmically while on the lake bed to increase the flow of water around it.

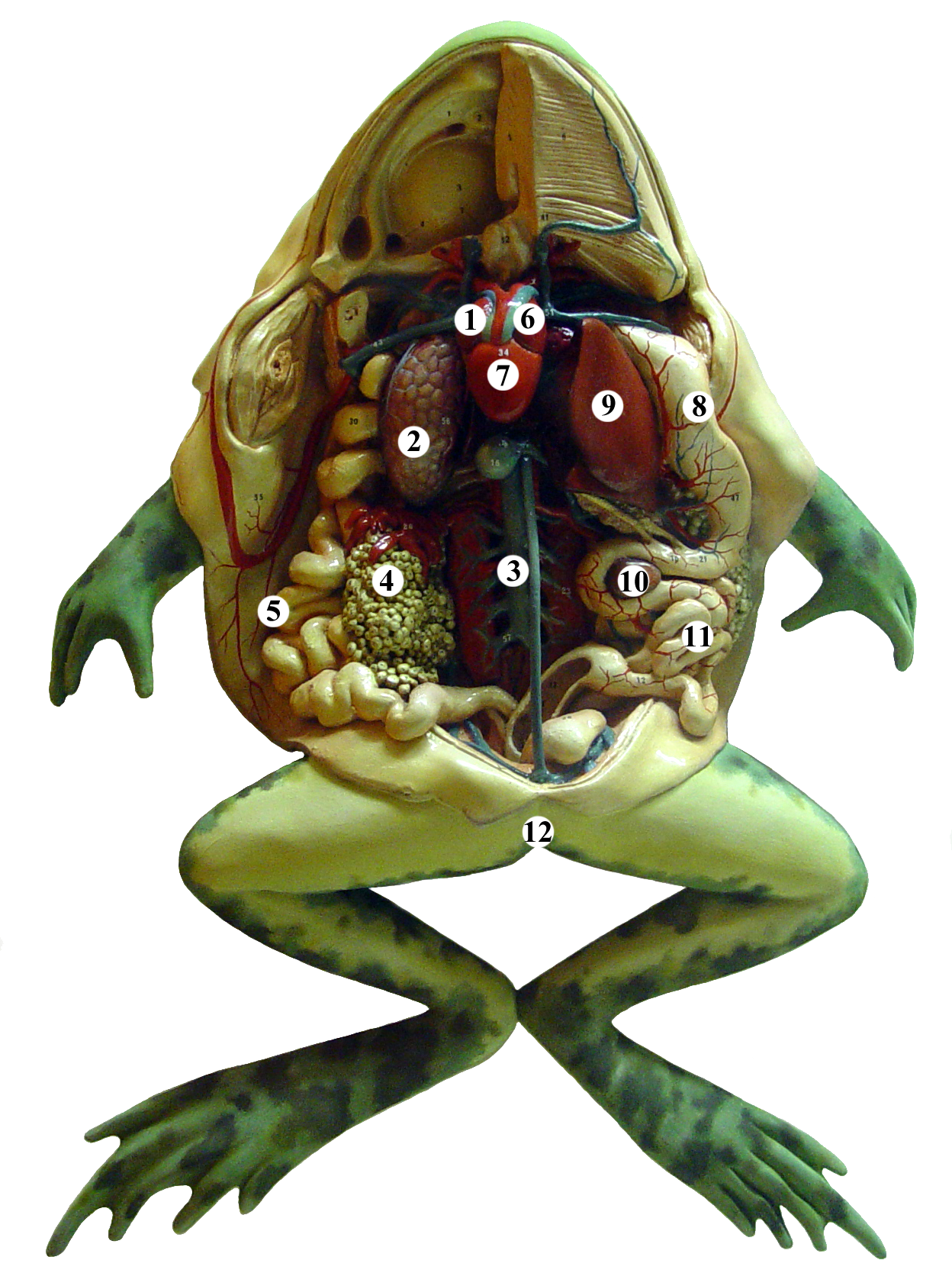
Anatomical model of a dissected frog: 1 Right atrium, 2 Lungs, 3 Aorta, 4 Egg mass, 5 Colon, 6 Left atrium, 7 Ventricle, 8 Stomach, 9 Liver, 10 Gallbladder, 11 Small intestine, 12 Cloaca

=== Digestion and excretion ===
Frogs have maxillary teeth along their upper jaw which are used to hold food before it is swallowed. These teeth are very weak, and cannot be used to chew or catch and harm agile prey. Instead, the frog uses its sticky, cleft tongue to catch insects and other small moving prey. The tongue normally lies coiled in the mouth, free at the back and attached to the mandible at the front. It can be shot out and retracted at great speed. In amphibians there are salivary glands on the tongue, which in frogs produce what is called a two-phase viscoelastic fluid. When exposed to pressure, like when the tongue is wrapping around a prey, it becomes runny and covers the prey's body. As the pressure drops, it returns to a thick and elastic state, which gives the tongue an extra grip. Some frogs have no tongue and just stuff food into their mouths with their hands. The African bullfrog (Pyxicephalus), which preys on relatively large animals such as mice and other frogs, has cone shaped bony projections called odontoid processes at the front of the lower jaw which function like teeth. The eyes assist in the swallowing of food as they can be retracted through holes in the skull and help push food down the throat.

The food then moves through the oesophagus into the stomach where digestive enzymes are added and it is churned up. It then proceeds to the small intestine (duodenum and ileum) where most digestion occurs. Pancreatic juice from the pancreas, and bile, produced by the liver and stored in the gallbladder, are secreted into the small intestine, where the fluids digest the food and the nutrients are absorbed. The food residue passes into the large intestine where excess water is removed and the wastes are passed out through the cloaca.

Although adapted to terrestrial life, frogs resemble freshwater fish in their inability to conserve body water effectively. When they are on land, much water is lost by evaporation from the skin. The excretory system is similar to that of mammals and there are two kidneys that remove nitrogenous products from the blood. Frogs produce large quantities of dilute urine in order to flush out toxic products from the kidney tubules. The nitrogen is excreted as ammonia by tadpoles and aquatic frogs but mainly as urea, a less toxic product, by most terrestrial adults. A few species of tree frog with little access to water excrete the even less toxic uric acid. The urine passes along paired ureters to the urinary bladder from which it is vented periodically into the cloaca. All bodily wastes exit the body through the cloaca which terminates in a cloacal vent.

=== Reproductive system ===
In the male frog, the two testes are attached to the kidneys and semen passes into the kidneys through fine tubes called efferent ducts. It then travels on through the ureters, which are consequently known as urinogenital ducts. There is no penis, and sperm is ejected from the cloaca directly onto the eggs as the female lays them. The ovaries of the female frog are beside the kidneys and the eggs pass down a pair of oviducts and through the cloaca to the exterior.

When frogs mate, the male climbs on the back of the female and wraps his fore limbs round her body, either behind the front legs or just in front of the hind legs. This position is called amplexus and may be held for several days. The male frog has certain hormone-dependent secondary sexual characteristics. These include the development of special pads on his thumbs in the breeding season, to give him a firm hold. The grip of the male frog during amplexus stimulates the female to release eggs, usually wrapped in jelly, as spawn. In many species the male is smaller and slimmer than the female. Males have vocal cords and make a range of croaks, particularly in the breeding season, and in some species they also have vocal sacs to amplify the sound.

=== Nervous system ===
Frogs have a highly developed nervous system that consists of a brain, spinal cord and nerves. Many parts of frog brains correspond with those of humans. It consists of two olfactory lobes, two cerebral hemispheres, a pineal body, two optic lobes, a cerebellum and a medulla oblongata. Muscular coordination and posture are controlled by the cerebellum, and the medulla oblongata regulates respiration, digestion and other automatic functions. The relative size of the cerebrum in frogs is much smaller than it is in humans. Frogs have ten pairs of cranial nerves which pass information from the outside directly to the brain, and ten pairs of spinal nerves which pass information from the extremities to the brain through the spinal cord. By contrast, all amniotes (mammals, birds and reptiles) have twelve pairs of cranial nerves.

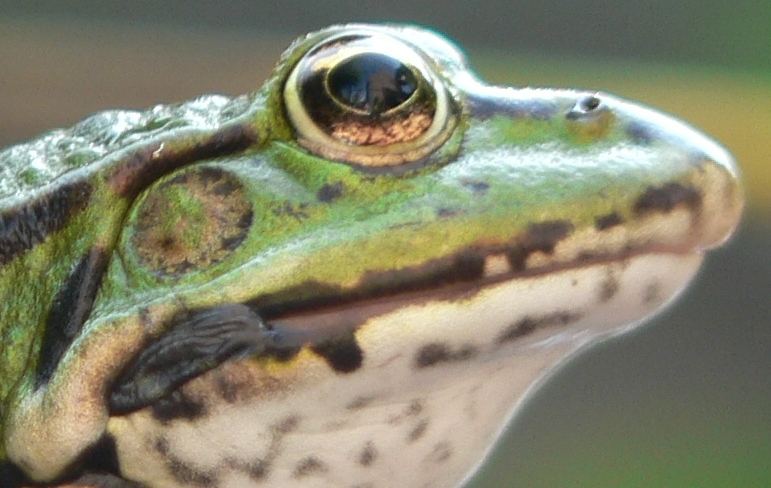
Close-up of frog's head showing eye, nostril, mouth, and tympanum

=== Sight ===
The eyes of most frogs are located on either side of the head near the top and project outwards as hemispherical bulges. They provide binocular vision over a field of 100° to the front and a total visual field of almost 360°. They may be the only part of an otherwise submerged frog to protrude from the water. Each eye has closable upper and lower lids and a nictitating membrane which provides further protection, especially when the frog is swimming. Members of the aquatic family Pipidae have the eyes located at the top of the head, a position better suited for detecting prey in the water above. The irises come in a range of colours and the pupils in a range of shapes. The common toad (Bufo bufo) has golden irises and horizontal slit-like pupils, the red-eyed tree frog (Agalychnis callidryas) has vertical slit pupils, the poison dart frog has dark irises, the fire-bellied toad (Bombina spp.) has triangular pupils and the tomato frog (Dyscophus spp.) has circular ones. The irises of the southern toad (Anaxyrus terrestris) are patterned so as to blend in with the surrounding camouflaged skin.

The distant vision of a frog is better than its near vision. Calling frogs will quickly become silent when they see an intruder or even a moving shadow but the closer an object is, the less well it is seen. When a frog shoots out its tongue to catch an insect it is reacting to a small moving object that it cannot see well and must line it up precisely beforehand because it shuts its eyes as the tongue is extended. Although it was formerly debated, more recent research has shown that frogs can see in colour, even in very low light.

=== Hearing ===
Surface rendering of the head of the frog Atelopus franciscus, with ear parts highlighted

Frogs can hear both in the air and below water. They do not have external ears; the eardrums (tympanic membranes) are directly exposed or may be covered by a layer of skin and are visible as a circular area just behind the eye. The size and distance apart of the eardrums is related to the frequency and wavelength at which the frog calls. In some species such as the bullfrog, the size of the tympanum indicates the sex of the frog; males have tympani that are larger than their eyes while in females, the eyes and tympani are much the same size. A noise causes the tympanum to vibrate and the sound is transmitted to the middle and inner ear. The middle ear contains semicircular canals which help control balance and orientation; the middle ear contains two ossicles, the columella (often with a cartilaginous extracolumella) and the batrachian operculum. In the inner ear, the auditory hair cells are arranged in two areas of the cochlea, the basilar papilla and the amphibian papilla. The former detects high frequencies and the latter low frequencies. Because the cochlea is short, frogs use electrical tuning to extend their range of audible frequencies and help discriminate different sounds. This arrangement enables detection of the territorial and breeding calls of their conspecifics. In some species that inhabit arid regions, the sound of thunder or heavy rain may arouse them from a dormant state. Additionally, a muscular connection from the batrachian operculum to the shoulder girdle allows low-frequency sounds to be transmitted through the forelimb to the middle ear. A frog may be startled by an unexpected noise but it will not usually take any action until it has located the source of the sound by sight.

=== Call ===
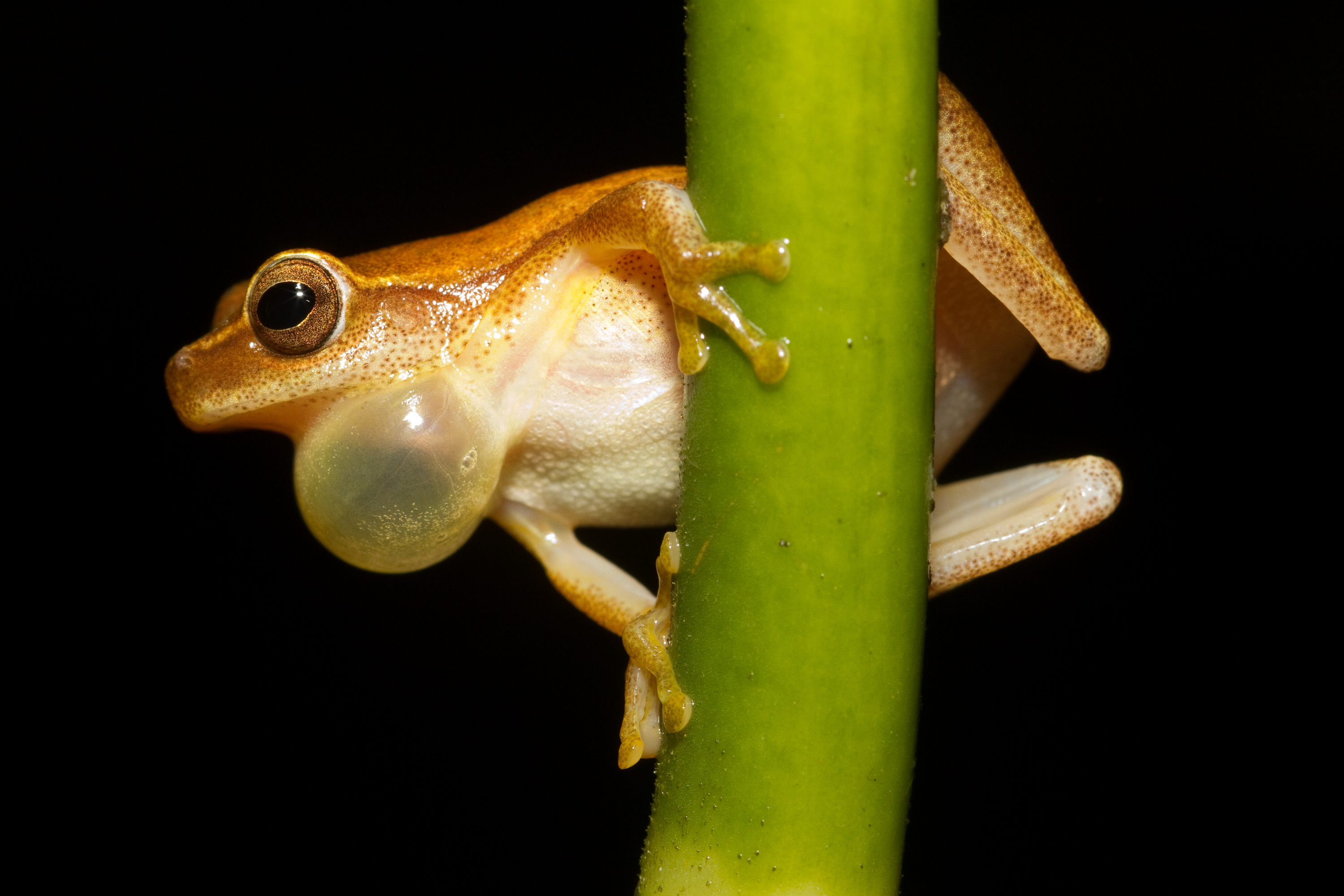
A male Dendropsophus microcephalus displaying its vocal sac during its call

Advertisement call of male Atelopus franciscus

frogs croak

The call or croak of a frog is unique to its species. Frogs create this sound by passing air through the larynx in the throat. In most calling frogs, the sound is amplified by one or more vocal sacs, membranes of skin under the throat or on the corner of the mouth, that distend during the amplification of the call. Some frog calls are so loud that they can be heard up to a mile (1.6 km) away. Additionally, some species have been found to use man-made structures such as drain pipes for artificial amplification of their call. The coastal tailed frog (Ascaphus truei) lives in mountain streams in North America and does not vocalise.

The main function of calling is for male frogs to attract mates. Males may call individually or there may be a chorus of sound where numerous males have converged on breeding sites. In many frog species, such as the common tree frog (Polypedates leucomystax), females reply to males' calls, which acts to reinforce reproductive activity in a breeding colony. Female frogs prefer males that produce sounds of greater intensity and lower frequency, attributes that stand out in a crowd. The rationale for this is thought to be that by demonstrating his prowess, the male shows his fitness to produce superior offspring.

A different call is emitted by a male frog or unreceptive female when mounted by another male. This is a distinct chirruping sound and is accompanied by a vibration of the body. Tree frogs and some non-aquatic species have a rain call that they make on the basis of humidity cues prior to a shower. Many species also have a territorial call that is used to drive away other males. All of these calls are emitted with the mouth of the frog closed. A distress call, emitted by some frogs when they are in danger, is produced with the mouth open resulting in a higher-pitched call. It is typically used when the frog has been grabbed by a predator and may serve to distract or disorient the attacker so that it releases the frog.

Distinctive low "jug-o-rum" sound of banded bullfrog

Many species of frog have deep calls. The croak of the American bullfrog (Rana catesbiana) is sometimes written as "jug o' rum". The Pacific tree frog (Pseudacris regilla) produces the onomatopoeic "ribbit" often heard in films. Other renderings of frog calls into speech include "brekekekex koax koax", the call of the marsh frog (Pelophylax ridibundus) in The Frogs, an Ancient Greek comic drama by Aristophanes. The calls of the Concave-eared torrent frog (Amolops tormotus) are unusual in many aspects. The males are notable for their varieties of calls where upward and downward frequency modulations take place. When they communicate, they produce calls that fall in the ultrasound frequency range. The last aspect that makes this species of frog's calls unusual is that nonlinear acoustic phenomena are important components in their acoustic signals.

=== Torpor ===
During extreme conditions, some frogs enter a state of torpor and remain inactive for months. In colder regions, many species of frog hibernate in winter. Those that live on land such as the American toad (Bufo americanus) dig a burrow and make a hibernaculum in which to lie dormant. Others, less proficient at digging, find a crevice or bury themselves in dead leaves. Aquatic species such as the American bullfrog (Rana catesbeiana) normally sink to the bottom of the pond where they lie, semi-immersed in mud but still able to access the oxygen dissolved in the water. Their metabolism slows down and they live on their energy reserves. Some frogs such as the wood frog, moor frog, or spring peeper can even survive being frozen. Ice crystals form under the skin and in the body cavity but the essential organs are protected from freezing by a high concentration of glucose. An apparently lifeless, frozen frog can resume respiration and its heartbeat can restart when conditions warm up.

At the other extreme, the striped burrowing frog (Cyclorana alboguttata) regularly aestivates during the hot, dry season in Australia, surviving in a dormant state without access to food and water for nine or ten months of the year. It burrows underground and curls up inside a protective cocoon formed by its shed skin. Researchers at the University of Queensland have found that during aestivation, the metabolism of the frog is altered and the operational efficiency of the mitochondria is increased. This means that the limited amount of energy available to the comatose frog is used in a more efficient manner. This survival mechanism is only useful to animals that remain completely unconscious for an extended period of time and whose energy requirements are low because they are cold-blooded and have no need to generate heat. Other research showed that, to provide these energy requirements, muscles atrophy, but hind limb muscles are preferentially unaffected. Frogs have been found to have upper critical temperatures of around 41 degrees Celsius.

== Locomotion ==
Different species of frog use a number of methods of moving around including jumping, running, walking, swimming, burrowing, climbing and gliding.

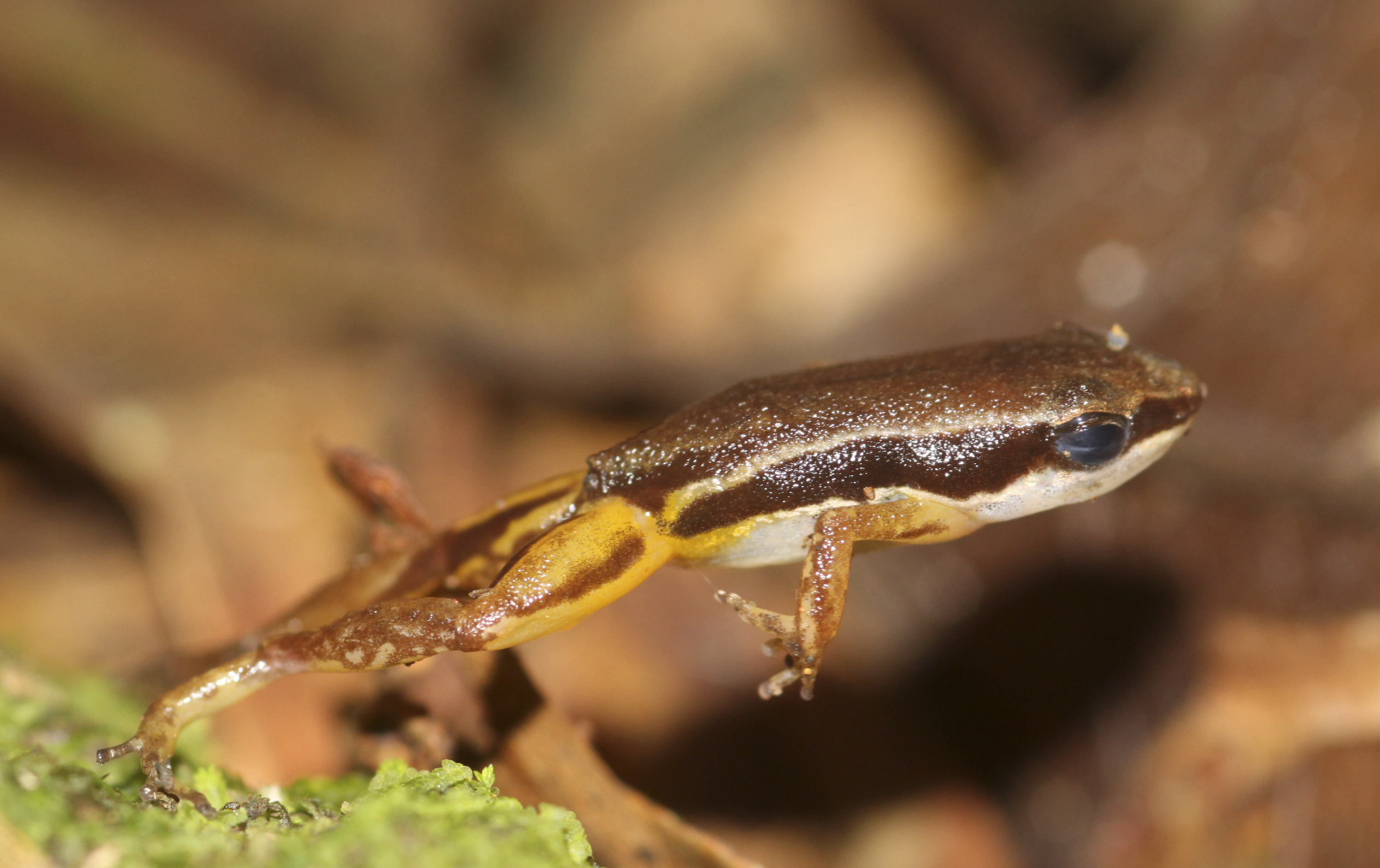
Rainforest rocket frog jumping

=== Jumping ===
Frogs are generally recognised as exceptional jumpers and, relative to their size, the best jumpers of all vertebrates. The striped rocket frog, Litoria nasuta, can leap over two metres (6 1/2 feet), a distance that is more than fifty times its body length of 55 mm (2 1/4 in). There are tremendous differences between species in jumping capability. Within a species, jump distance increases with increasing size, but relative jumping distance (body-lengths jumped) decreases. The Indian skipper frog (Euphlyctis cyanophlyctis) has the ability to leap out of the water from a position floating on the surface. The tiny northern cricket frog (Acris crepitans) can "skitter" across the surface of a pond with a series of short rapid jumps.

Slow-motion photography shows that the muscles have passive flexibility. They are first stretched while the frog is still in the crouched position, then they are contracted before being stretched again to launch the frog into the air. The fore legs are folded against the chest and the hind legs remain in the extended, streamlined position for the duration of the jump. In some extremely capable jumpers, such as the Cuban tree frog (Osteopilus septentrionalis) and the northern leopard frog (Lithobates pipiens), the peak power exerted during a jump can exceed that which the muscle is theoretically capable of producing. When the muscles contract, the energy is first transferred into the stretched tendon which is wrapped around the ankle bone. Then the muscles stretch again at the same time as the tendon releases its energy like a catapult to produce a powerful acceleration beyond the limits of muscle-powered acceleration. A similar mechanism has been documented in locusts and grasshoppers.

Early hatching of froglets can have negative effects on frog jumping performance and overall locomotion. The hindlimbs are unable to completely form, which results in them being shorter and much weaker relative to a normal hatching froglet. Early hatching froglets may tend to depend on other forms of locomotion more often, such as swimming and walking.

=== Walking and running ===
Phrynomantis bifasciatus walking on a level surface

Frogs in the families Bufonidae, Rhinophrynidae, and Microhylidae have short back legs and tend to walk rather than jump. When they try to move rapidly, they speed up the rate of movement of their limbs or resort to an ungainly hopping gait. The Great Plains narrow-mouthed toad (Gastrophryne olivacea) has been described as having a gait that is "a combination of running and short hops that are usually only an inch or two in length". In an experiment, Fowler's toad (Anaxyrus fowleri) was placed on a treadmill which was turned at varying speeds. By measuring the toad's uptake of oxygen it was found that hopping was an inefficient use of resources during sustained locomotion but was a useful strategy during short bursts of high-intensity activity.

The red-legged running frog (Kassina maculata) has short, slim hind limbs unsuited to jumping. It can move fast by using a running gait in which the two hind legs are used alternately. Slow-motion photography shows, unlike a horse that can trot or gallop, the frog's gait remained similar at slow, medium, and fast speeds. This species can also climb trees and shrubs, and does so at night to catch insects. The Indian skipper frog (Euphlyctis cyanophlyctis) has broad feet and can run across the surface of the water for several metres (yards).

=== Swimming ===
Common toad (Bufo bufo) swimming

Frogs that live in or visit water have adaptations that improve their swimming abilities. The hind limbs are heavily muscled and strong. The webbing between the toes of the hind feet increases the area of the foot and helps propel the frog powerfully through the water. Members of the family Pipidae are wholly aquatic and show the most marked specialisation. They have inflexible vertebral columns, flattened, streamlined bodies, lateral line systems, and powerful hind limbs with large webbed feet. Tadpoles mostly have large tail fins which provide thrust when the tail is moved from side to side.

=== Burrowing ===
Some frogs have become adapted for burrowing and a life underground. They tend to have rounded bodies, short limbs, small heads with bulging eyes, and hind feet adapted for excavation. An extreme example of this is the purple frog (Nasikabatrachus sahyadrensis) from southern India which feeds on termites and spends almost its whole life underground. It emerges briefly during the monsoon to mate and breed in temporary pools. It has a tiny head with a pointed snout and a plump, rounded body. Because of this fossorial existence, it was first described in 2003, being new to the scientific community at that time, although previously known to local people.

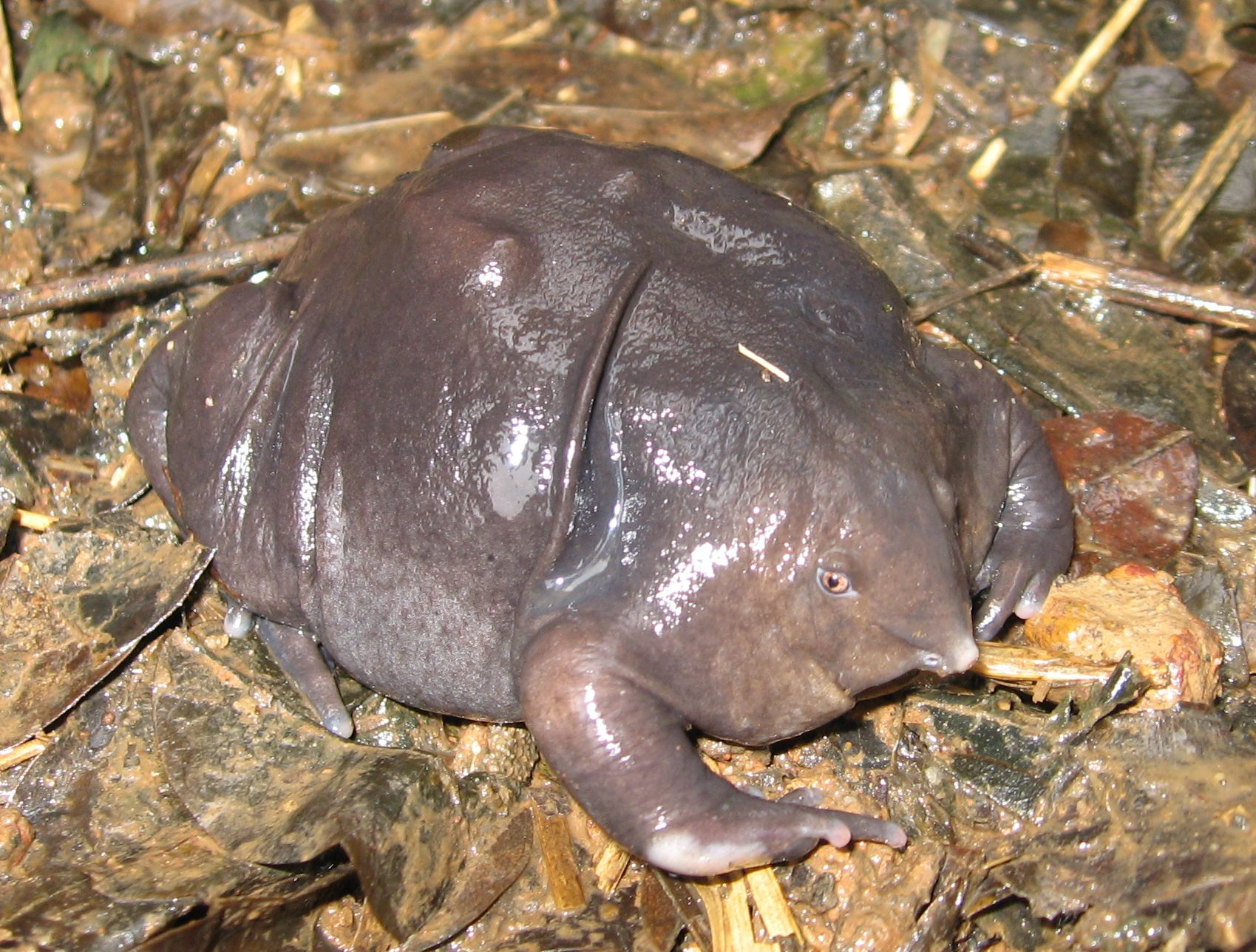
Purple frog (Nasikabatrachus sahyadrensis)

The spadefoot toads of North America are also adapted to underground life. The plains spadefoot toad (Spea bombifrons) is typical and has a flap of keratinised bone attached to one of the metatarsals of the hind feet which it uses to dig itself backwards into the ground. As it digs, the toad wriggles its hips from side to side to sink into the loose soil. It has a shallow burrow in the summer from which it emerges at night to forage. In winter, it digs much deeper and has been recorded at a depth of 4.5 m (14 ft 9 in). The tunnel is filled with soil and the toad hibernates in a small chamber at the end. During this time, urea accumulates in its tissues and water is drawn in from the surrounding damp soil by osmosis to supply the toad's needs. Spadefoot toads are explosive breeders, all emerging from their burrows at the same time and converging on temporary pools, attracted to one of these by the calling of the first male to find a suitable breeding location.

The burrowing frogs of Australia have a different lifestyle. The western spotted frog (Heleioporus albopunctatus) digs a burrow beside a river or in the bed of an ephemeral stream and regularly emerges to forage. Mating takes place and eggs are laid in a foam nest inside the burrow. The eggs partially develop there but do not hatch until they are submerged following heavy rainfall. The tadpoles then swim out into the open water and rapidly complete their development. Madagascan burrowing frogs are less fossorial and mostly bury themselves in leaf litter. One of these, the green burrowing frog (Scaphiophryne marmorata), has a flattened head with a short snout and well-developed metatarsal tubercles on its hind feet to help with excavation. It also has greatly enlarged terminal discs on its fore feet that help it to clamber around in bushes. It breeds in temporary pools that form after rains.

=== Climbing ===
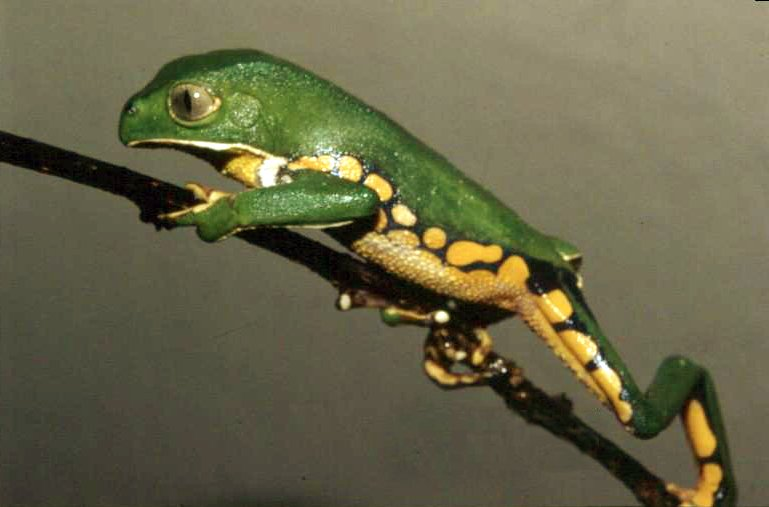
Burmeister's leaf frog

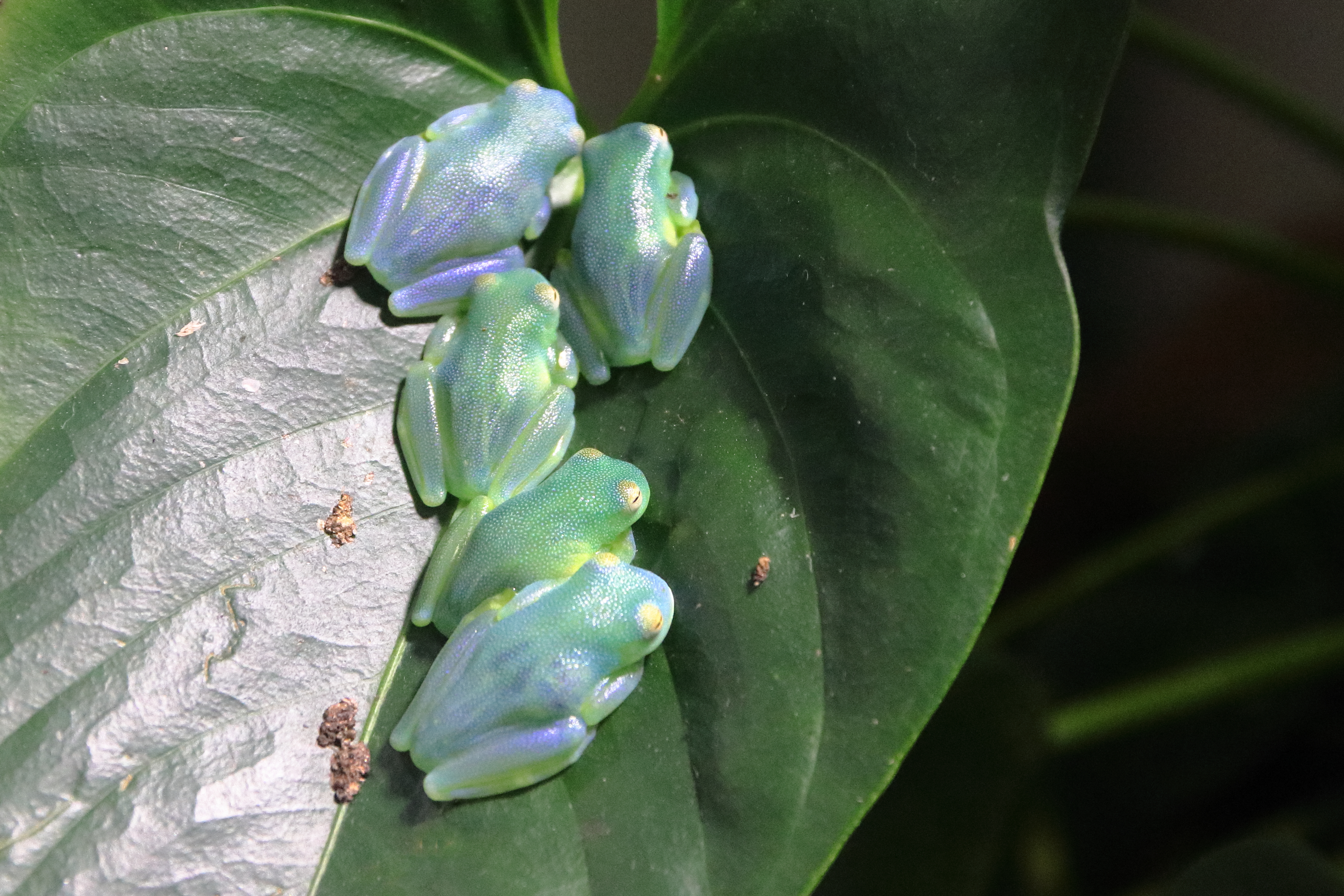
Group of glass frogs

Tree frogs live high in the canopy, where they scramble around on the branches, twigs, and leaves, sometimes never coming down to earth. The "true" tree frogs belong to the family Hylidae, but members of other frog families have independently adopted an arboreal habit, a case of convergent evolution. These include the glass frogs (Centrolenidae), the bush frogs (Hyperoliidae), some of the narrow-mouthed frogs (Microhylidae), and the shrub frogs (Rhacophoridae). Most tree frogs are under 10 cm (4 in) in length, with long legs and long toes with adhesive pads on the tips. The surface of the toe pads is formed from a closely packed layer of flat-topped, hexagonal epidermal cells separated by grooves into which glands secrete mucus. These toe pads, moistened by the mucus, provide the grip on any wet or dry surface, including glass. The forces involved include boundary friction of the toe pad epidermis on the surface and also surface tension and viscosity. Tree frogs are very acrobatic and can catch insects while hanging by one toe from a twig or clutching onto the blade of a windswept reed. Some members of the subfamily Phyllomedusinae have opposable toes on their feet. The reticulated leaf frog (Phyllomedusa ayeaye) has a single opposed digit on each fore foot and two opposed digits on its hind feet. This allows it to grasp the stems of bushes as it clambers around in its riverside habitat.

=== Gliding ===
During the evolutionary history of frogs, several different groups have independently taken to the air. Some frogs in the tropical rainforest are specially adapted for gliding from tree to tree or parachuting to the forest floor. Typical of them is Wallace's flying frog (Rhacophorus nigropalmatus) from Malaysia and Borneo. It has large feet with the fingertips expanded into flat adhesive discs and the digits fully webbed. Flaps of skin occur on the lateral margins of the limbs and across the tail region. With the digits splayed, the limbs outstretched, and these flaps spread, it can glide considerable distances, but is unable to undertake powered flight. It can alter its direction of travel and navigate distances of up to 15 m (50 ft) between trees.

== Life history ==
Life cycle of the green frog (Rana clamitans)

=== Reproduction ===
Two main types of reproduction occur in frogs, prolonged breeding and explosive breeding. In the former, adopted by the majority of species, adult frogs at certain times of year assemble at a pond, lake or stream to breed. Many frogs return to the bodies of water in which they developed as larvae. This often results in annual migrations involving thousands of individuals. In explosive breeders, mature adult frogs arrive at breeding sites in response to certain trigger factors such as rainfall occurring in an arid area. In these frogs, mating and spawning take place promptly and the speed of larval growth is rapid in order to make use of the ephemeral pools before they dry up.

Among prolonged breeders, males usually arrive at the breeding site first and remain there for some time whereas females tend to arrive later and depart soon after they have spawned. This means that males outnumber females at the water's edge and defend territories from which they expel other males. They advertise their presence by calling, often alternating their croaks with neighbouring frogs. Larger, stronger males tend to have deeper calls and maintain higher quality territories. Females select their mates at least partly on the basis of the depth of their voice. In some species, there are satellite males who have no territory and do not call. They may intercept females that are approaching a calling male or take over a vacated territory. Calling is an energy-sapping activity. Sometimes, the two roles are reversed and a calling male gives up its territory and becomes a satellite.

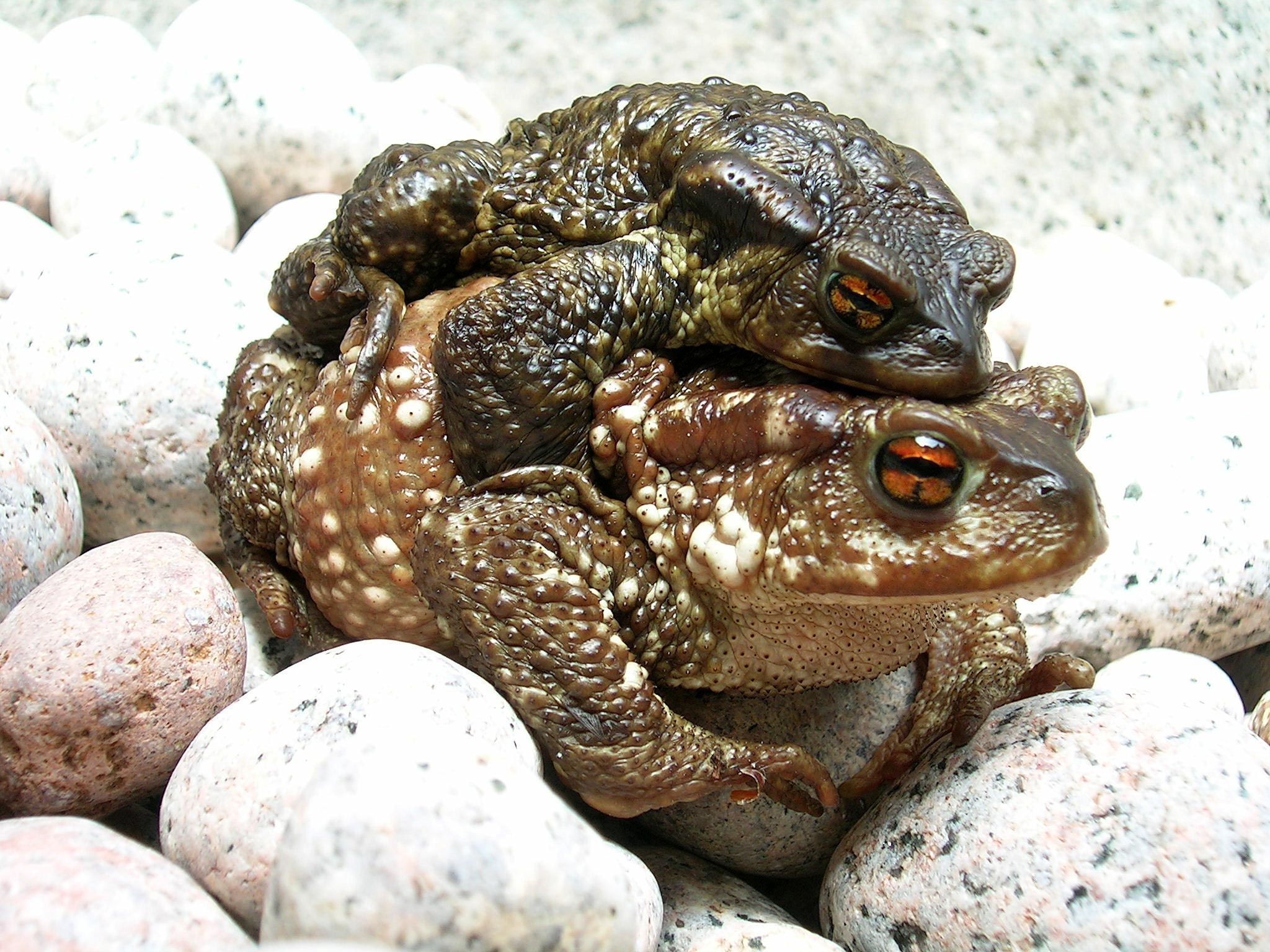
Male and female common toads (Bufo bufo) in amplexus

In explosive breeders, the first male that finds a suitable breeding location, such as a temporary pool, calls loudly and other frogs of both sexes converge on the pool. Explosive breeders tend to call in unison creating a chorus that can be heard from far away. The spadefoot toads (Scaphiopus spp.) of North America fall into this category. Mate selection and courtship is not as important as speed in reproduction. In some years, suitable conditions may not occur and the frogs may go for two or more years without breeding. Some female New Mexico spadefoot toads (Spea multiplicata) only spawn half of the available eggs at a time, perhaps retaining some in case a better reproductive opportunity arises later.

At the breeding site, the male mounts the female and grips her tightly round the body. Typically, amplexus takes place in the water, the female releases her eggs and the male covers them with sperm; fertilisation is external. In many species, such as the Great Plains toad (Bufo cognatus), the male restrains the eggs with his back feet, holding them in place for about three minutes. Members of the West African genus Nimbaphrynoides are unique among frogs in that they are viviparous; Limnonectes larvaepartus, Eleutherodactylus jasperi and members of the Tanzanian genus Nectophrynoides are the only frogs known to be ovoviviparous. In these species, fertilisation is internal and females give birth to fully developed juvenile frogs, except L. larvaepartus, which give birth to tadpoles.

=== Life cycle ===
==== Eggs / frogspawn ====
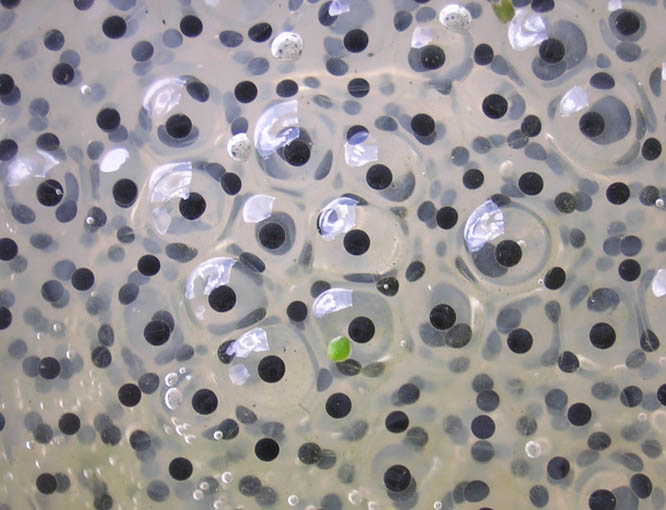
Frogspawn

Frogs may lay their eggs as clumps, surface films, strings, or individually. Around half of species deposit eggs in water, others lay eggs in vegetation, on the ground or in excavations. The tiny yellow-striped pygmy eleuth (Eleutherodactylus limbatus) lays eggs singly, burying them in moist soil. The smoky jungle frog (Leptodactylus pentadactylus) makes a nest of foam in a hollow. The eggs hatch when the nest is flooded, or the tadpoles may complete their development in the foam if flooding does not occur. The red-eyed treefrog (Agalychnis callidryas) deposits its eggs on a leaf above a pool and when they hatch, the larvae fall into the water below.

In certain species, such as the wood frog (Rana sylvatica), symbiotic unicellular green algae are present in the gelatinous material. It is thought that these may benefit the developing larvae by providing them with extra oxygen through photosynthesis. The interior of globular egg clusters of the wood frog has also been found to be up to 6 °C (11 °F) warmer than the surrounding water and this speeds up the development of the larvae. The larvae developing in the eggs can detect vibrations caused by nearby predatory wasps or snakes, and will hatch early to avoid being eaten. In general, the length of the egg stage depends on the species and the environmental conditions. Aquatic eggs normally hatch within one week when the capsule splits as a result of enzymes released by the developing larvae.

Direct development, where eggs hatch into juveniles like small adults, is also known in many frogs, for example, Ischnocnema henselii, Eleutherodactylus coqui, and Raorchestes ochlandrae and Raorchestes chalazodes.

==== Tadpoles ====
Frogspawn development

The larvae that emerge from the eggs are known as tadpoles (or occasionally polliwogs). Tadpoles lack eyelids and limbs, and have cartilaginous skeletons, gills for respiration (external gills at first, internal gills later), and tails they use for swimming. As a general rule, free-living larvae are fully aquatic, but at least one species (Nannophrys ceylonensis) has semiterrestrial tadpoles that live among wet rocks.

From early in its development, a gill pouch covers the tadpole's gills and front legs. The lungs soon start to develop and are used as an accessory breathing organ. Some species go through metamorphosis while still inside the egg and hatch directly into small frogs. Tadpoles lack true teeth, but the jaws in most species have two elongated, parallel rows of small, keratinized structures called keradonts in their upper jaws. Their lower jaws usually have three rows of keradonts surrounded by a horny beak, but the number of rows can vary and the exact arrangements of mouth parts provide a means for species identification. In the Pipidae, with the exception of Hymenochirus, the tadpoles have paired anterior barbels, which make them resemble small catfish. Their tails are stiffened by a notochord, but does not contain any bony or cartilaginous elements except for a few vertebrae at the base which forms the urostyle during metamorphosis. This has been suggested as an adaptation to their lifestyles; because the transformation into frogs happens very fast, the tail is made of soft tissue only, as bone and cartilage take a much longer time to be broken down and absorbed. An exception from the rule is found in family Megophryidae, where at least 5 of 11 genera have tail vertebrae. The tail fin and tip is fragile and will easily tear, which is seen as an adaptation to escape from predators which try to grasp them by the tail.

Tadpoles are typically herbivorous, feeding mostly on algae, including diatoms filtered from the water through the gills. Some species are carnivorous at the tadpole stage, eating insects, smaller tadpoles, and fish. The Cuban tree frog (Osteopilus septentrionalis) is one of a number of species in which the tadpoles can be cannibalistic. Tadpoles that develop legs early may be eaten by the others, so late developers may have better long-term survival prospects.

Tadpoles are highly vulnerable to being eaten by fish, newts, predatory diving beetles, and birds, particularly water birds, such as storks and herons and domestic ducks. Some tadpoles, including those of the cane toad (Rhinella marina), are poisonous. The tadpole stage may be as short as a week in explosive breeders or it may last through one or more winters followed by metamorphosis in the spring.

==== Metamorphosis ====
At the end of the tadpole stage, a frog undergoes metamorphosis in which its body makes a sudden transition into the adult form. This metamorphosis typically lasts only 24 hours, and is initiated by production of the hormone thyroxine. This causes different tissues to develop in different ways. The principal changes that take place include the development of the lungs and the disappearance of the gills and gill pouch, making the front legs visible. The lower jaw transforms into the big mandible of the carnivorous adult, and the long, spiral gut of the herbivorous tadpole is replaced by the typical short gut of a predator. Homeostatic feedback control of food intake is largely absent, making tadpoles eat constantly when food is present. But shortly before and during metamorphosis the sensation of hunger is suppressed, and they stop eating while their gut and internal organs are reorganised and prepared for a different diet. Also the gut microbiota changes, from being similar to that of fish to resembling that of amniotes. Exceptions are carnivorous tadpoles like Lepidobatrachus laevis, which has a gut already adapted to a diet similar to that of adults. These continue to eat during metamorphosis. The nervous system becomes adapted for hearing and stereoscopic vision, and for new methods of locomotion and feeding. The eyes are repositioned higher up on the head and the eyelids and associated glands are formed. The eardrum, middle ear, and inner ear are developed. The skin becomes thicker and tougher, the lateral line system is lost, and skin glands are developed. The final stage is the disappearance of the tail, but this takes place rather later, the tissue being used to produce a spurt of growth in the limbs. Frogs are at their most vulnerable to predators when they are undergoing metamorphosis. At this time, the tail is being lost and locomotion by means of limbs is only just becoming established.

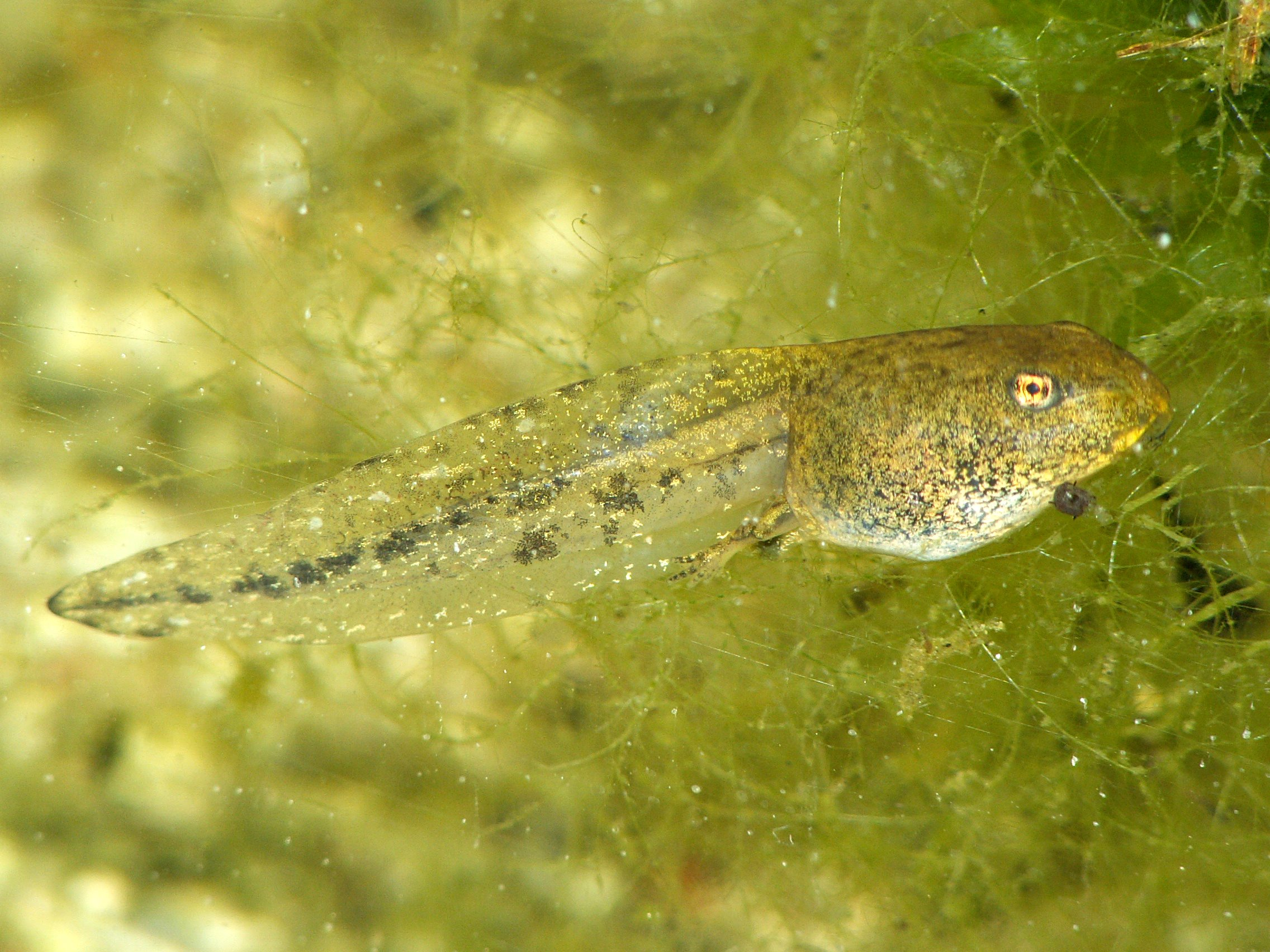
Larva of the common frog Rana temporaria a day before metamorphosis

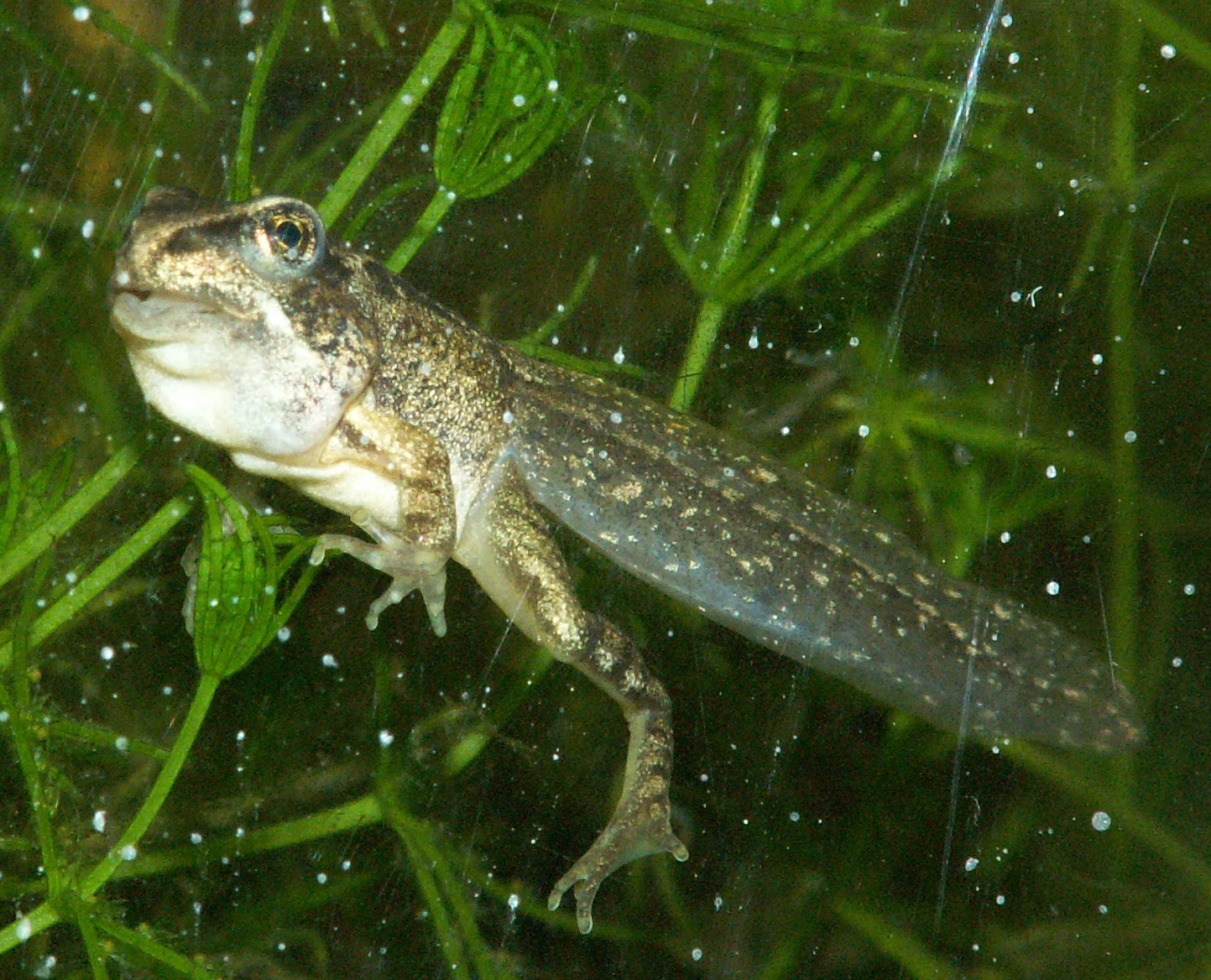
Metamorphosis stage with deforming jaws, large eyes, and remains of gill pouch

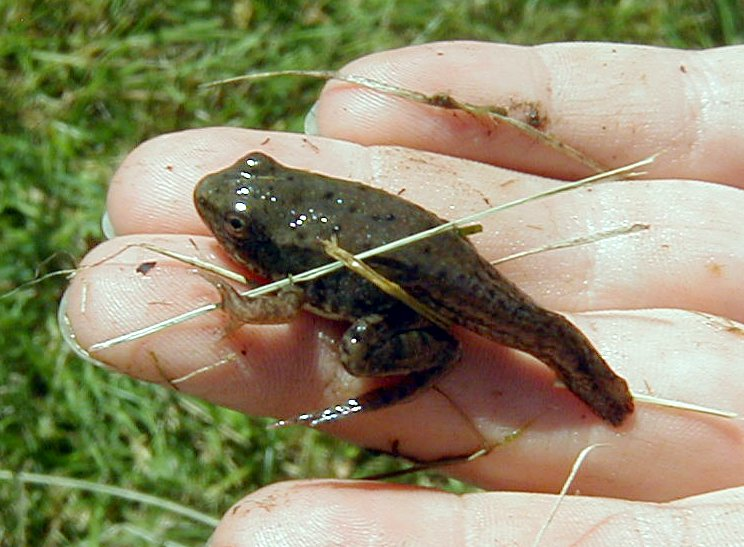
Young frog with a stumpy tail, metamorphosis nearly complete

==== Adults ====
A Xenopus laevis froglet after metamorphosis

Adult frogs may live in or near water, but few are fully aquatic. Almost all frog species are carnivorous as adults, preying on invertebrates, including insects, crabs, spiders, mites, worms, snails, and slugs. A few of the larger ones may eat other frogs, small mammals and reptiles, and fish. A few species also eat plant matter; the tree frog Xenohyla truncata is partly herbivorous, its diet including a large proportion of fruit, floral structures and nectar. Leptodactylus mystaceus has been found to eat plants, and folivory occurs in Euphlyctis hexadactylus, with plants constituting 79.5% of its diet by volume. Many frogs use their sticky tongues to catch prey, while others simply grab them with their mouths. Adult frogs are themselves attacked by many predators. The northern leopard frog (Rana pipiens) is eaten by herons, hawks, fish, large salamanders, snakes, raccoons, skunks, mink, bullfrogs, and other animals.

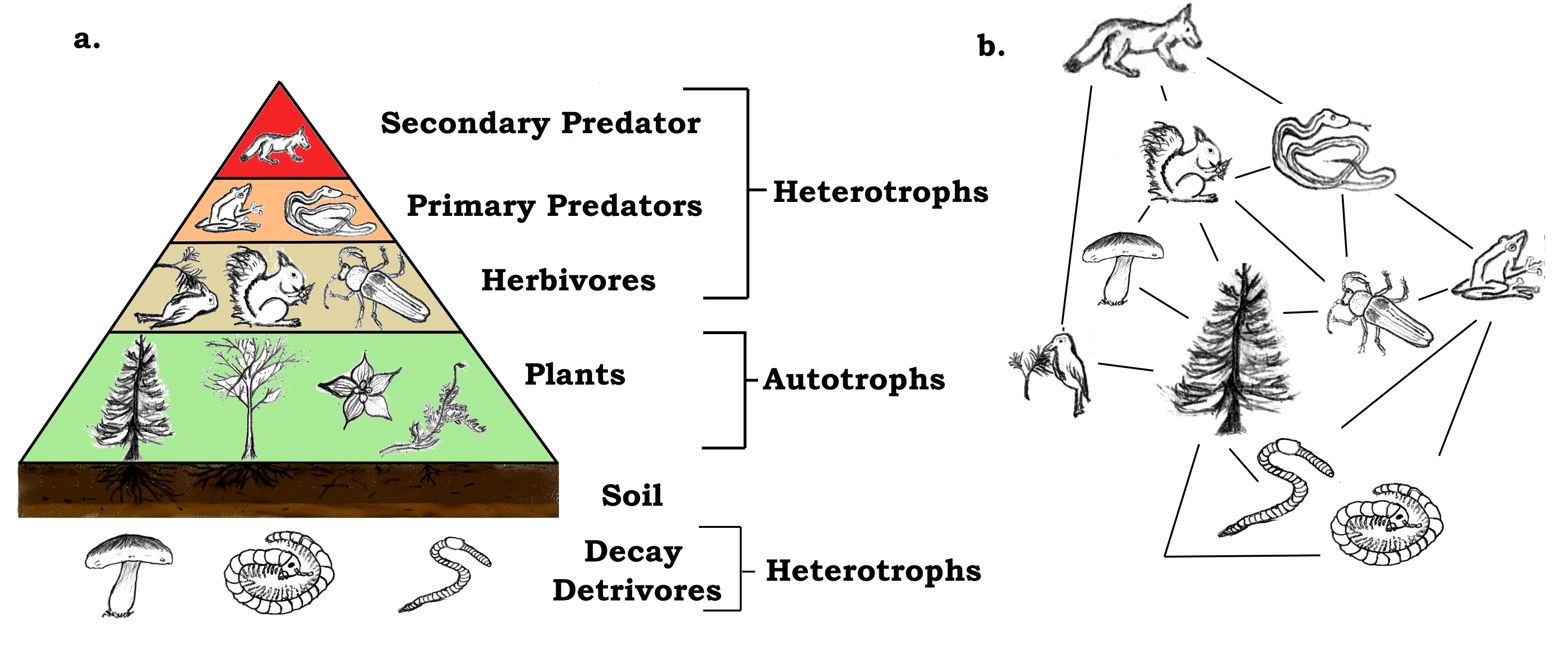
A trophic pyramid showing frogs as primary predators

Frogs are primary predators and an important part of the food web. Being cold-blooded, they make efficient use of the food they eat with little energy being used for metabolic processes, while the rest is transformed into biomass. They are themselves eaten by secondary predators and are the primary terrestrial consumers of invertebrates, most of which feed on plants. By reducing herbivory, they play a part in increasing the growth of plants and are thus part of a delicately balanced ecosystem.

Little is known about the longevity of frogs and toads in the wild, but some can live for many years. Skeletochronology is a method of examining bones to determine age. Using this method, the ages of mountain yellow-legged frogs (Rana muscosa) were studied, the phalanges of the toes showing seasonal lines where growth slows in winter. The oldest frogs had ten bands, so their age was believed to be 14 years, including the four-year tadpole stage. Captive frogs and toads have been recorded as living for up to 40 years, an age achieved by a European common toad (Bufo bufo). The cane toad (Rhinella marina) has been known to survive 24 years in captivity, and the American bullfrog (Rana catesbeiana) 14 years. Frogs from temperate climates hibernate during the winter, and four species are known to be able to withstand freezing during this time, including the wood frog (Rana sylvatica).

=== Parental care ===
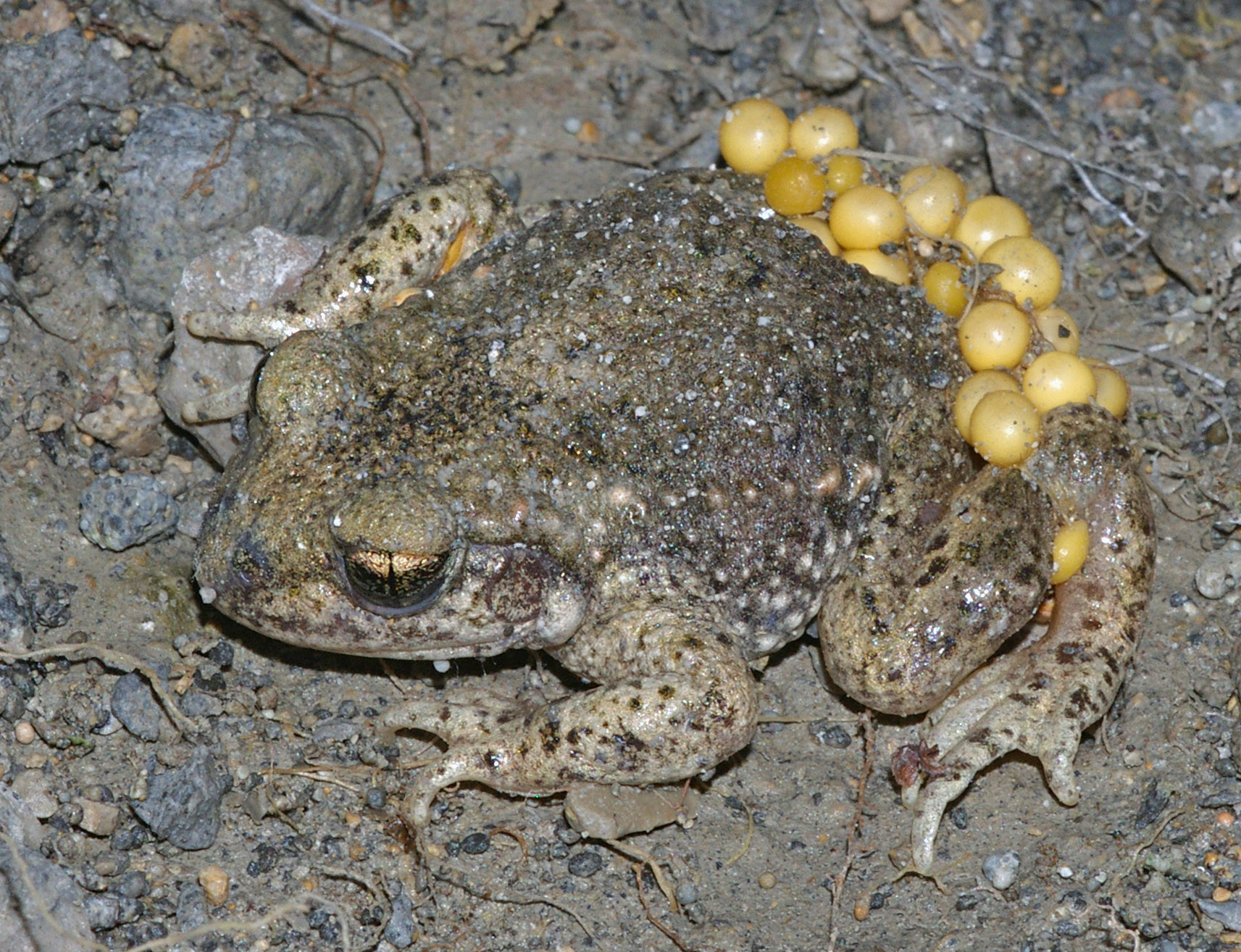
Male common midwife toad (Alytes obstetricans) with eggs

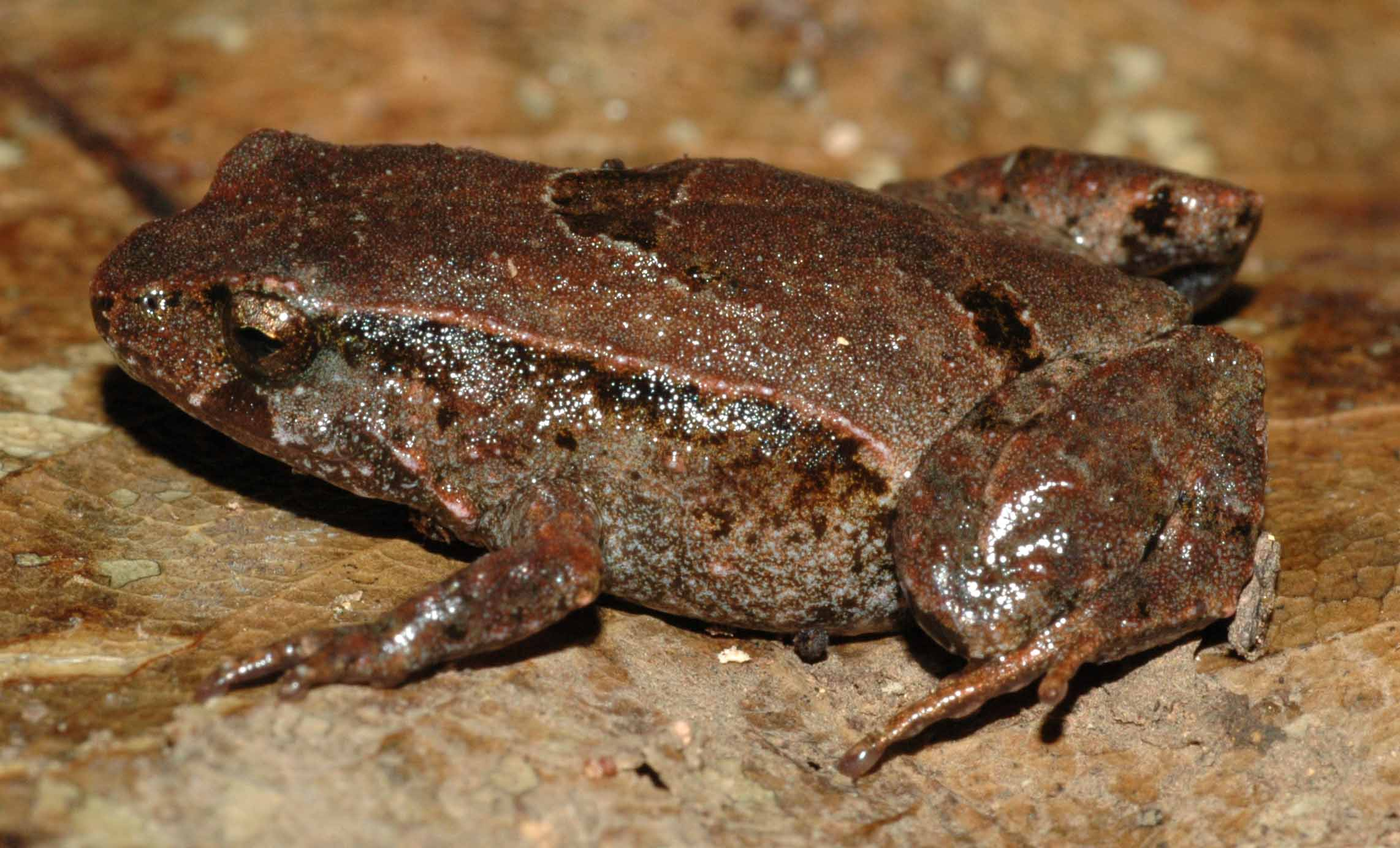
Pouched frog (Assa darlingtoni)

Although care of offspring is poorly understood in frogs, up to an estimated 20% of amphibian species may care for their young in some way. The evolution of parental care in frogs is driven primarily by the size of the water body in which they breed. Those that breed in smaller water bodies tend to have greater and more complex parental care behaviour. Because predation of eggs and larvae is high in large water bodies, some frog species started to lay their eggs on land. Once this happened, the desiccating terrestrial environment demands that one or both parents keep them moist to ensure their survival. The subsequent need to transport hatched tadpoles to a water body required an even more intense form of parental care.

In small pools, predators are mostly absent and competition between tadpoles becomes the variable that constrains their survival. Certain frog species avoid this competition by making use of smaller phytotelmata (water-filled leaf axils or small woody cavities) as sites for depositing a few tadpoles. While these smaller rearing sites are free from competition, they also lack sufficient nutrients to support a tadpole without parental assistance. Frog species that changed from the use of larger to smaller phytotelmata have evolved a strategy of providing their offspring with nutritive but unfertilised eggs. The female strawberry poison-dart frog (Oophaga pumilio) lays her eggs on the forest floor. The male frog guards them from predation and carries water in his cloaca to keep them moist. When they hatch, the female moves the tadpoles on her back to a water-holding bromeliad or other similar water body, depositing just one in each location. She visits them regularly and feeds them by laying one or two unfertilised eggs in the phytotelma, continuing to do this until the young are large enough to undergo metamorphosis. The granular poison frog (Oophaga granulifera) looks after its tadpoles in a similar way.

Many other diverse forms of parental care are seen in frogs. The tiny male Colostethus subpunctatus stands guard over his egg cluster, laid under a stone or log. When the eggs hatch, he transports the tadpoles on his back to a temporary pool, where he partially immerses himself in the water and one or more tadpoles drop off. He then moves on to another pool. The male common midwife toad (Alytes obstetricans) carries the eggs around with him attached to his hind legs. He keeps them damp in dry weather by immersing himself in a pond, and prevents them from getting too wet in soggy vegetation by raising his hindquarters. After three to six weeks, he travels to a pond and the eggs hatch into tadpoles. The tungara frog (Physalaemus pustulosus) builds a floating nest from foam to protect its eggs from predation. The foam is made from proteins and lectins, and seems to have antimicrobial properties. Several pairs of frogs may form a colonial nest on a previously built raft. The eggs are laid in the centre, followed by alternate layers of foam and eggs, finishing with a foam capping.

Some frogs protect their offspring inside their own bodies. Both male and female pouched frogs (Assa darlingtoni) guard their eggs, which are laid on the ground. When the eggs hatch, the male lubricates his body with the jelly surrounding them and immerses himself in the egg mass. The tadpoles wriggle into skin pouches on his side, where they develop until they metamorphose into juvenile frogs. The female gastric-brooding frog (Rheobatrachus sp.) from Australia, now probably extinct, swallows her fertilised eggs, which then develop inside her stomach. She ceases to feed and stops secreting stomach acid. The tadpoles rely on the yolks of the eggs for nourishment. After six or seven weeks, they are ready for metamorphosis. The mother regurgitates the tiny frogs, which hop away from her mouth. The female Darwin's frog (Rhinoderma darwinii) from Chile lays up to 40 eggs on the ground, where they are guarded by the male. When the tadpoles are about to hatch, they are engulfed by the male, which carries them around inside his much-enlarged vocal sac. Here they are immersed in a frothy, viscous liquid that contains some nourishment to supplement what they obtain from the yolks of the eggs. They remain in the sac for seven to ten weeks before undergoing metamorphosis, after which they move into the male's mouth and emerge.

== Defence ==
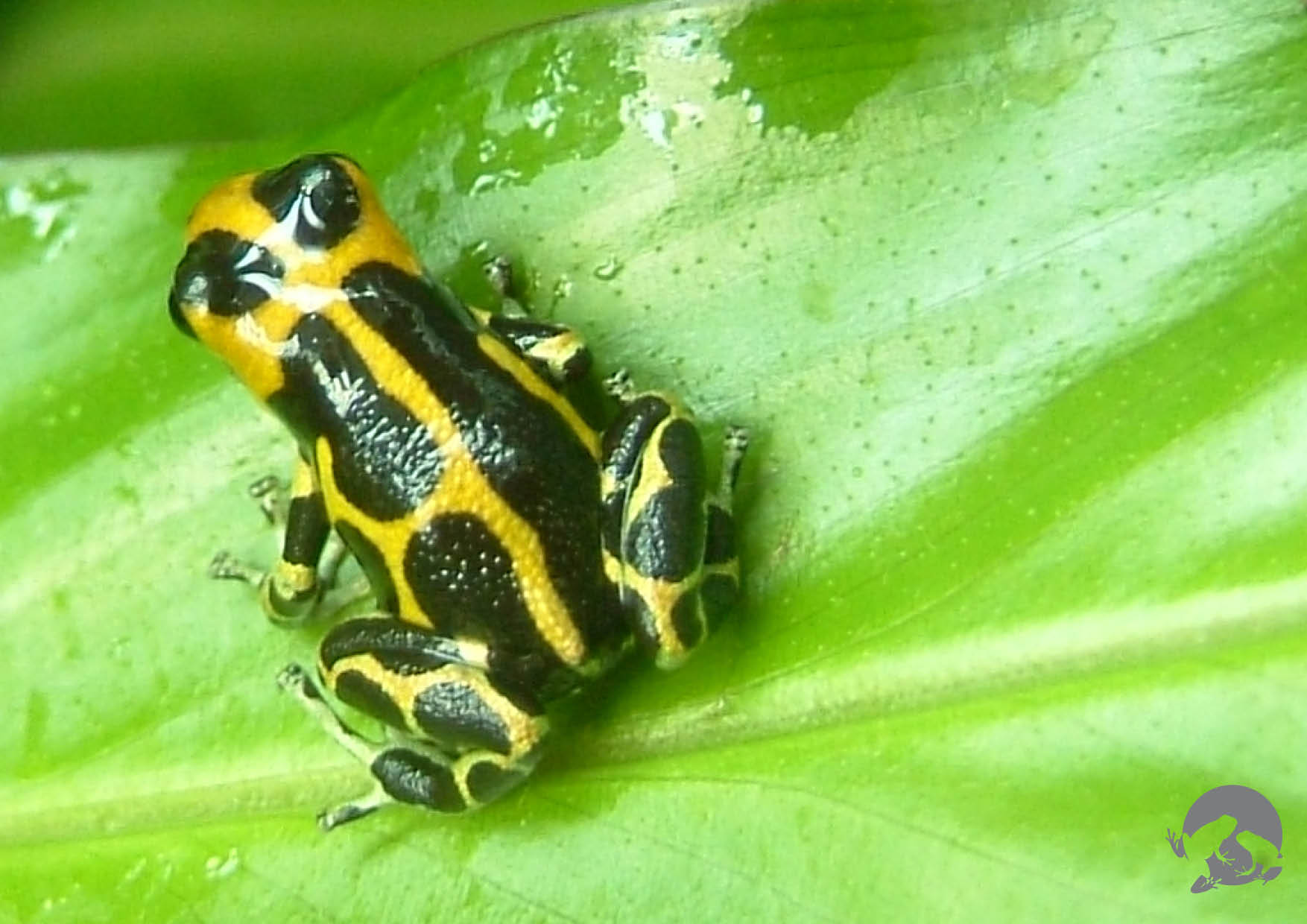
The mildly toxic Ranitomeya imitator

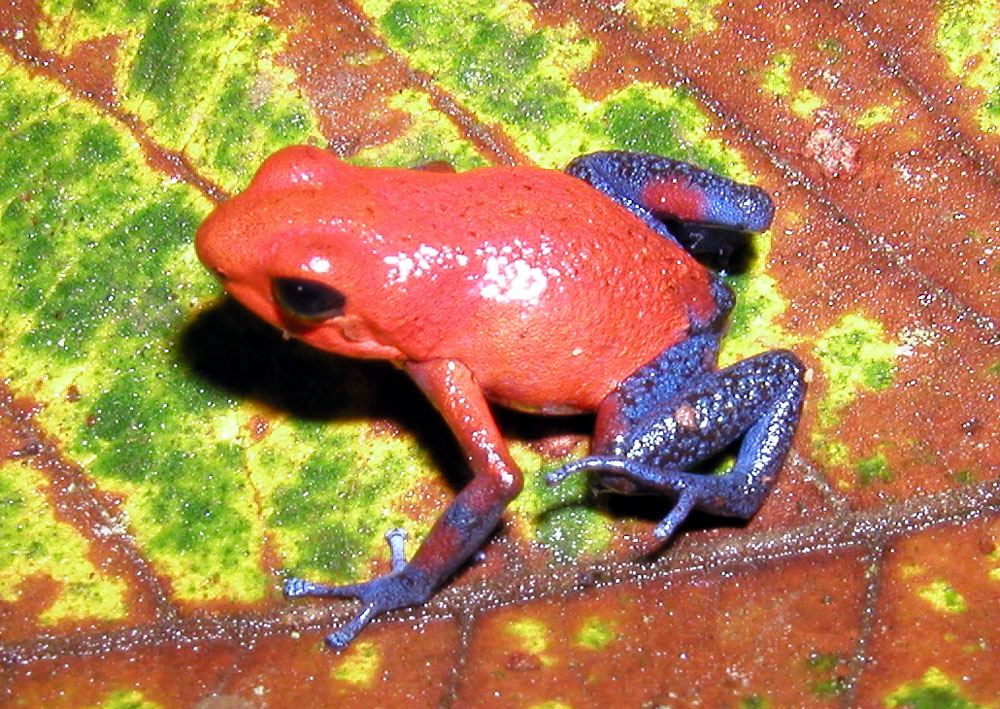
Strawberry poison-dart frog contains numerous alkaloids which deter predators.

At first sight, frogs seem rather defenceless because of their small size, slow movement, thin skin, and lack of defensive structures, such as spines, claws or teeth. Many use camouflage to avoid detection, the skin often being spotted or streaked in neutral colours that allow a stationary frog to merge into its surroundings. Some can make prodigious leaps, often into water, that help them to evade potential attackers, while many have other defensive adaptations and strategies.

The skin of many frogs contains mild toxic substances called bufotoxins to make them unpalatable to potential predators. Most toads and some frogs have large poison glands, the parotoid glands, located on the sides of their heads behind the eyes and other glands elsewhere on their bodies. These glands secrete mucus and a range of toxins that make frogs slippery to hold and distasteful or poisonous. If the noxious effect is immediate, the predator may cease its action and the frog may escape. If the effect develops more slowly, the predator may learn to avoid that species in future. Poisonous frogs tend to advertise their toxicity with bright colours, an adaptive strategy known as aposematism. The poison dart frogs in the family Dendrobatidae do this. They are typically red, orange, or yellow, often with contrasting black markings on their bodies. Allobates zaparo is not poisonous, but mimics the appearance of two different toxic species with which it shares a common range in an effort to deceive predators. Other species, such as the European fire-bellied toad (Bombina bombina), have their warning colour underneath. They "flash" this when attacked, adopting a pose that exposes the vivid colouring on their bellies.

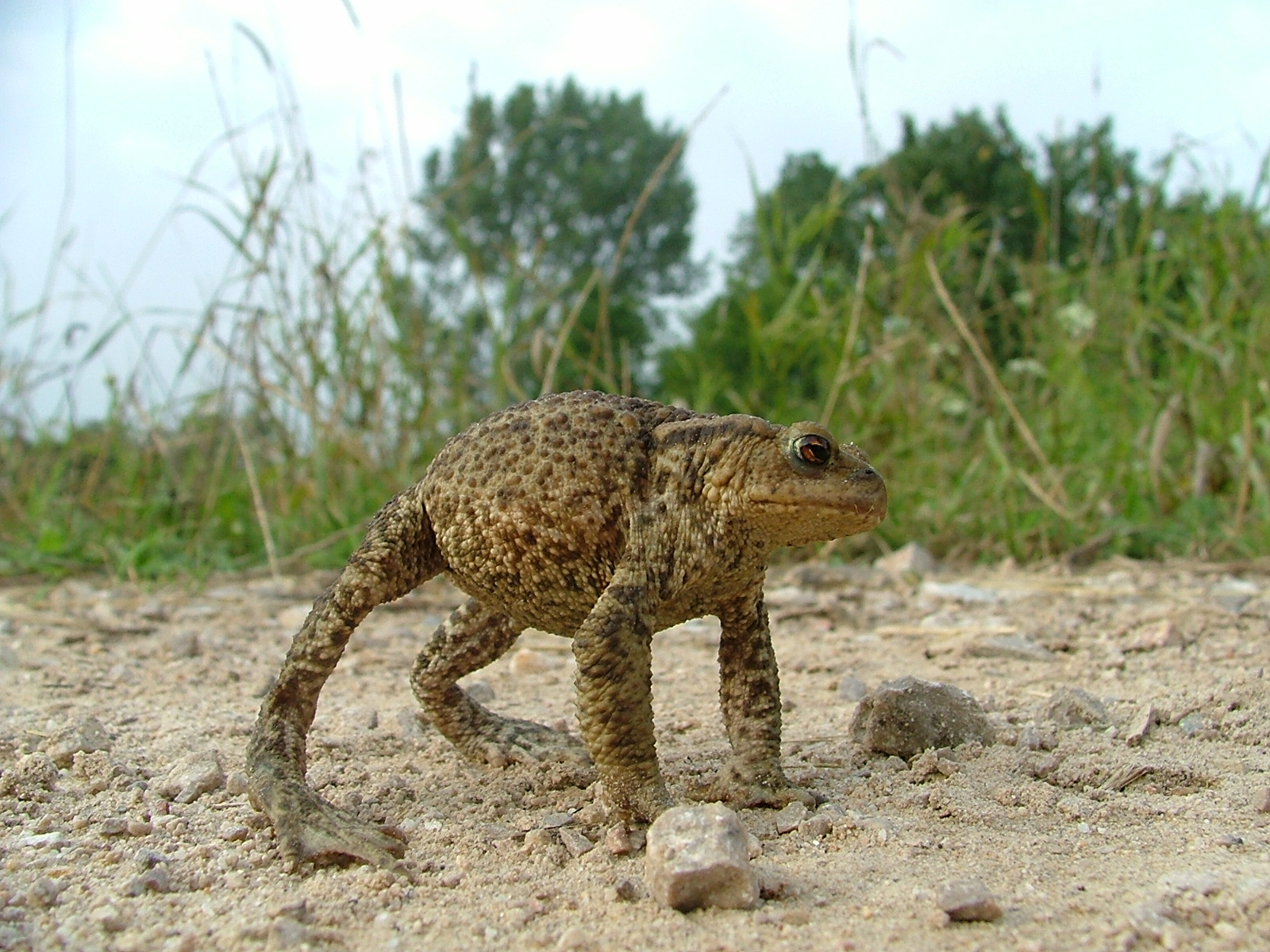
A common toad adopting a defensive stance

Some frogs, such as the poison dart frogs, are especially toxic. The native peoples of South America extract poison from these frogs to apply to their weapons for hunting, although few species are toxic enough to be used for this purpose. At least two non-poisonous frog species in tropical America (Eleutherodactylus gaigei and Lithodytes lineatus) mimic the colouration of dart poison frogs for self-protection. Some frogs obtain poisons from the ants and other arthropods they eat. Others, such as the Australian corroboree frogs (Pseudophryne corroboree and Pseudophryne pengilleyi), can synthesize the alkaloids themselves. The chemicals involved may be irritants, hallucinogens, convulsants, nerve poisons or vasoconstrictors. Many predators of frogs have become adapted to tolerate high levels of these poisons, but other creatures, including humans who handle the frogs, may be severely affected.

Some frogs use bluff or deception. The European common toad (Bufo bufo) adopts a characteristic stance when attacked, inflating its body and standing with its hindquarters raised and its head lowered. The bullfrog (Rana catesbeiana) crouches down with eyes closed and head tipped forward when threatened. This places the parotoid glands in the most effective position, the other glands on its back begin to ooze noxious secretions and the most vulnerable parts of its body are protected. Another tactic used by some frogs is to "scream", the sudden loud noise tending to startle the predator. The grey tree frog (Hyla versicolor) makes an explosive sound that sometimes repels the shrew Blarina brevicauda. Although toads are avoided by many predators, the common garter snake (Thamnophis sirtalis) regularly feeds on them. The strategy employed by juvenile American toads (Bufo americanus) on being approached by a snake is to crouch down and remain immobile. This is usually successful, with the snake passing by and the toad remaining undetected. If it is encountered by the snake's head, however, the toad hops away before crouching defensively.

== Distribution ==
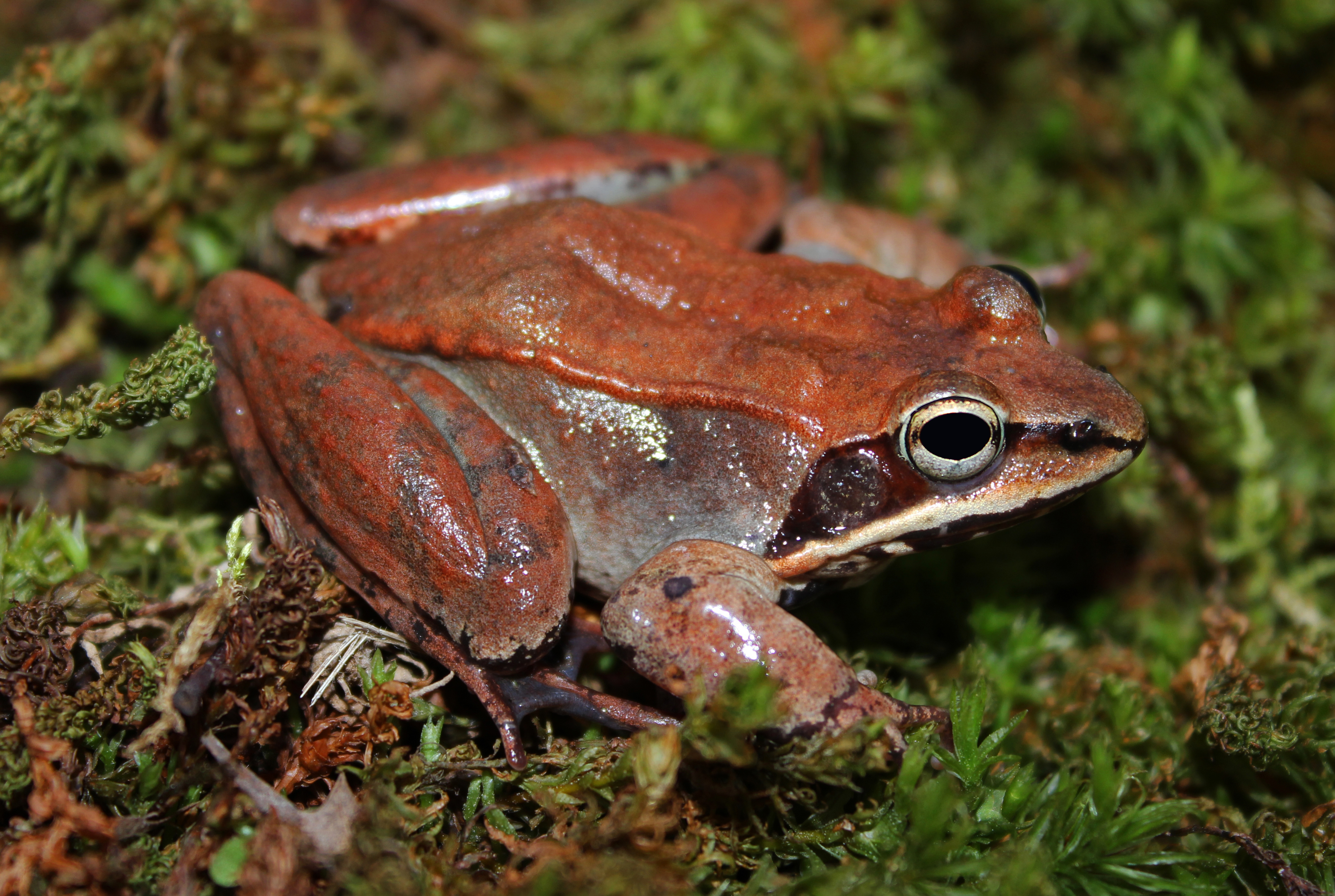
Although frogs are most diverse in warm regions, a few species like the wood frog live at the Arctic Circle.

Frogs live on every continent except Antarctica, but they are not present on certain islands, especially those far away from continental land masses. Many species are isolated in restricted ranges by changes of climate or inhospitable territory, such as stretches of sea, mountain ridges, deserts, forest clearance, road construction, or other human-made barriers. Usually, a greater diversity of frogs occurs in tropical areas than in temperate regions, such as Europe. Some frogs inhabit arid areas, such as deserts, and rely on specific adaptations to survive. Members of the Australian genus Cyclorana bury themselves underground where they create a water-impervious cocoon in which to aestivate during dry periods. Once it rains, they emerge, find a temporary pool, and breed. Egg and tadpole development is very fast compared with those of most other frogs, so breeding can be completed before the pond dries up. Some frog species are adapted to a cold environment. The wood frog (Rana sylvatica), whose habitat extends into the Arctic Circle, buries itself in the ground during winter. Although much of its body freezes during this time, it maintains a high concentration of glucose in its vital organs, which protects them from damage.

== Conservation ==
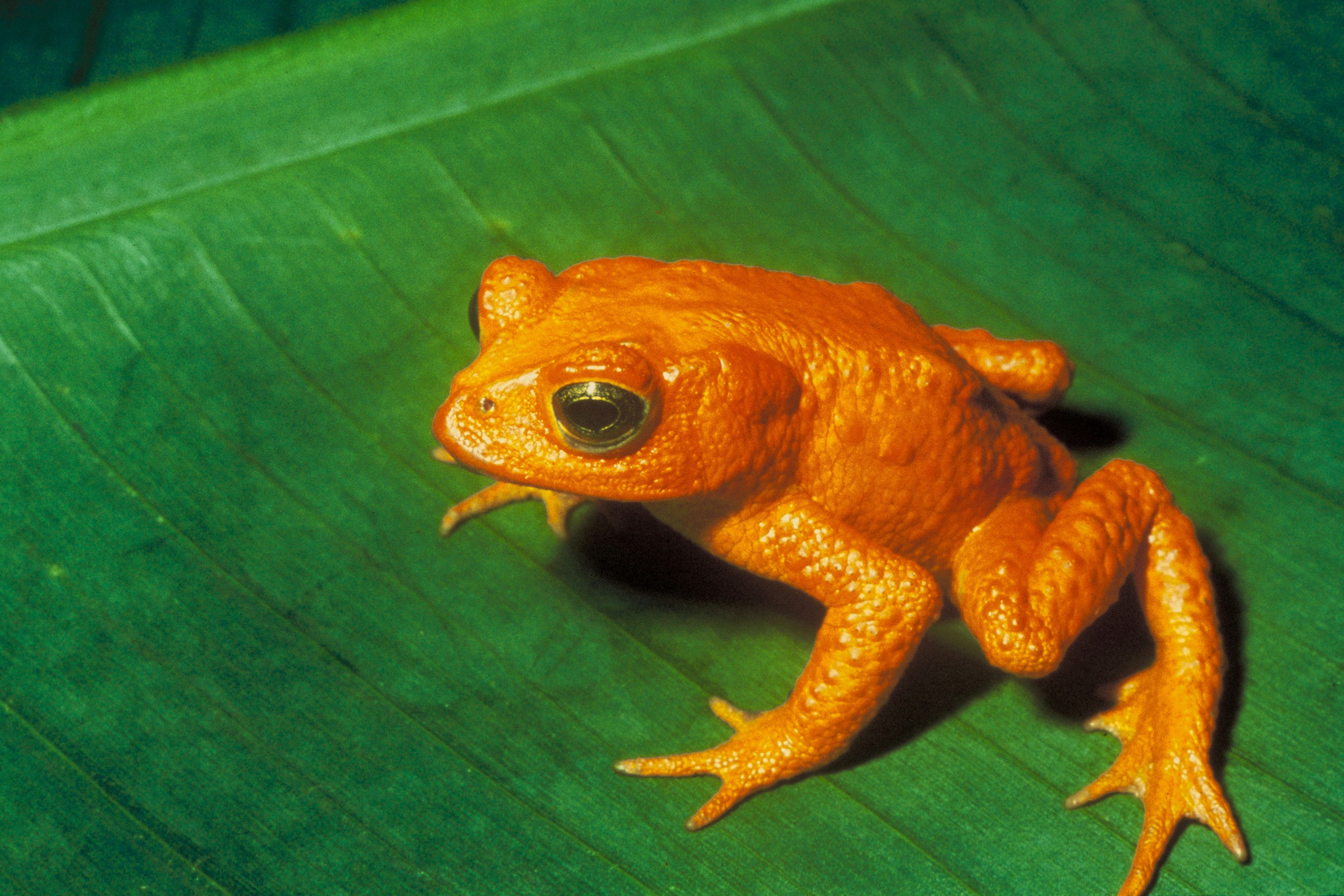
Golden toad (Bufo periglenes) – last seen in 1989

In 2006, of 4,035 species of amphibians that depend on water during some lifecycle stage, 1,356 (33.6%) were considered to be threatened. This is likely to be an underestimate because it excludes 1,427 species for which evidence was insufficient to assess their status. Frog populations have declined dramatically since the 1950s. More than one-third of frog species are considered to be threatened with extinction, and more than 120 species are believed to have become extinct since the 1980s. Among these species are the gastric-brooding frogs of Australia and the golden toad of Costa Rica. The latter is of particular concern to scientists because it inhabited the pristine Monteverde Cloud Forest Reserve and its population crashed in 1987, along with about 20 other frog species in the area. This could not be linked directly to human activities, such as deforestation, and was outside the range of normal fluctuations in population size. Elsewhere, habitat loss is a significant cause of frog population decline, as are pollutants, climate change, increased UVB radiation, and the introduction of non-native predators and competitors. A Canadian study conducted in 2006 suggested heavy traffic in their environment was a larger threat to frog populations than was habitat loss. Emerging infectious diseases, including chytridiomycosis and ranavirus, are also devastating populations.

Many environmental scientists believe amphibians, including frogs, are good biological indicators of broader ecosystem health because of their intermediate positions in food chains, their permeable skins, and typically biphasic lives (aquatic larvae and terrestrial adults). It appears that species with both aquatic eggs and larvae are most affected by the decline, while those with direct development are the most resistant.

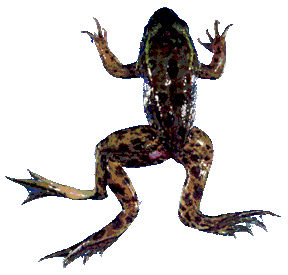
Deformed mink frog with an extra left leg

Frog mutations and genetic defects have increased since the 1990s. These often include missing legs or extra legs. Various causes have been identified or hypothesized, including an increase in ultraviolet radiation affecting the spawn on the surface of ponds, chemical contamination from pesticides and fertilizers, and parasites such as the trematode Ribeiroia ondatrae. Probably all these are involved in a complex way as stressors, environmental factors contributing to rates of disease, and vulnerability to attack by parasites. Malformations impair mobility and the individuals may not survive to adulthood. An increase in the number of frogs eaten by birds may actually increase the likelihood of parasitism of other frogs, because the trematode's complex lifecycle includes the ramshorn snail and several intermediate hosts, such as birds.

In a few cases, captive breeding programs have been established and have largely been successful. The World Association of Zoos and Aquariums named 2008 as the "Year of the Frog" in order to draw attention to the conservation issues faced by them.

The cane toad (Rhinella marina) is a very adaptable species native to South and Central America. In the 1930s, it was introduced into Puerto Rico, and later various other islands in the Pacific and Caribbean region, as a biological pest control agent. In 1935, 3000 toads were liberated in the sugar cane fields of Queensland, Australia, in an attempt to control cane beetles such as Dermolepida albohirtum, the larvae of which damage and kill the canes. Initial results in many of these countries were positive, but it later became apparent that the toads upset the ecological balance in their new environments. They bred freely, competed with native frog species, ate bees and other harmless native invertebrates, had few predators in their adopted habitats, and poisoned pets, carnivorous birds, and mammals. In many of these countries, they are now regarded both as pests and invasive species, and scientists are looking for a biological method to control them.

== Human uses ==
=== Culinary ===
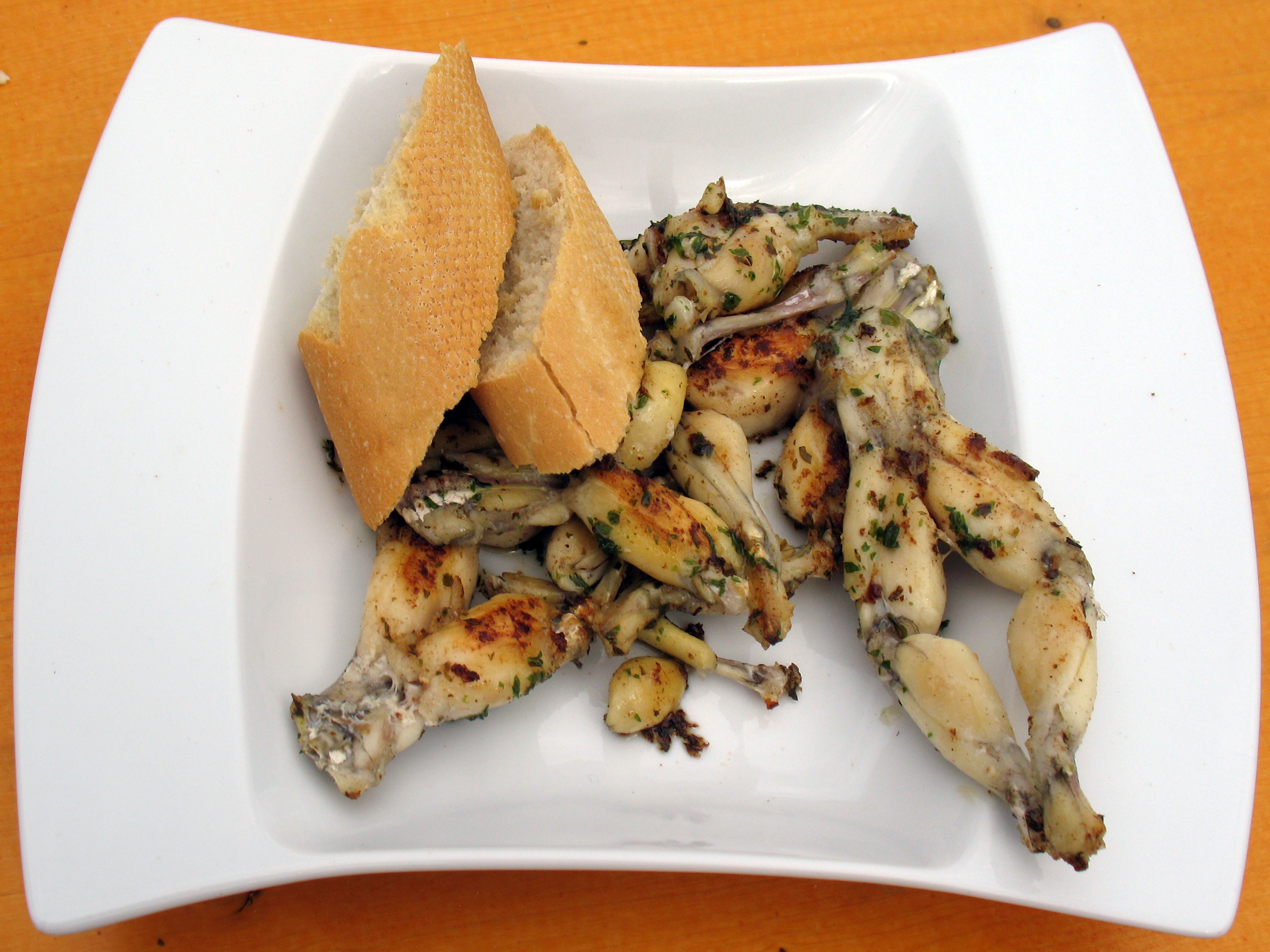
French cuisses de grenouille

Frog legs are eaten by humans in many parts of the world. Indonesia is the world's largest exporter of frog meat, exporting more than 5,000 tonnes of frog meat each year, mostly to France, Belgium and Luxembourg. Originally, they were supplied from local wild populations, but overexploitation led to a diminution in the supply. This resulted in the development of frog farming and a global trade in frogs. The main importing countries are France, Belgium, Luxembourg, and the United States, while the chief exporting nations are Indonesia and China. The annual global trade in the American bullfrog (Rana catesbeiana), mostly farmed in China, varies between 1200 and 2400 tonnes.

The mountain chicken frog, so-called as it tastes of chicken, is now endangered, in part due to human consumption, and was a major food choice of the Dominicans. Raccoon, opossum, partridges, prairie chicken, and frogs were among the fare Mark Twain recorded as part of American cuisine.

=== Scientific research ===
In November 1970, NASA sent two bullfrogs into space for six days during the Orbiting Frog Otolith mission to test weightlessness.

Frogs are used for dissections in high school and university anatomy classes, often first being injected with coloured substances to enhance contrasts among the biological systems. This practice is declining due to animal welfare concerns, and "digital frogs" are now available for virtual dissection.

Frogs have served as experimental animals throughout the history of science. Eighteenth-century biologist Luigi Galvani discovered the link between electricity and the nervous system by studying frogs. He created one of the first tools for measuring electric current out of a frog leg. In 1852, H. F. Stannius used a frog's heart in a procedure called a Stannius ligature to demonstrate the ventricle and atria beat independently of each other and at different rates. The African clawed frog or platanna (Xenopus laevis) was first widely used in laboratories in pregnancy tests in the first half of the 20th century. A sample of urine from a pregnant woman injected into a female frog induces it to lay eggs, a discovery made by English zoologist Lancelot Hogben. This is because a hormone, human chorionic gonadotropin, is present in substantial quantities in the urine of women during pregnancy. In 1952, Robert Briggs and Thomas J. King cloned a frog by somatic cell nuclear transfer. This same technique was later used to create Dolly the sheep, and their experiment was the first time a successful nuclear transplantation had been accomplished in higher animals.

Frogs are used in cloning research and other branches of embryology. Frogs of the genus Xenopus are used as a model organism in developmental biology because their embryos are large and easy to manipulate, they are readily obtainable, and can easily be kept in the laboratory. Xenopus laevis is increasingly being displaced by its smaller relative, Xenopus tropicalis, which reaches its reproductive age in five months rather than the one to two years for X. laevis, thus facilitating faster studies across generations.

Genomes of Xenopus laevis, X. tropicalis, Rana catesbeiana, Rhinella marina, and Nanorana parkeri have been sequenced and deposited in the NCBI Genome database.

=== Pharmaceutical ===
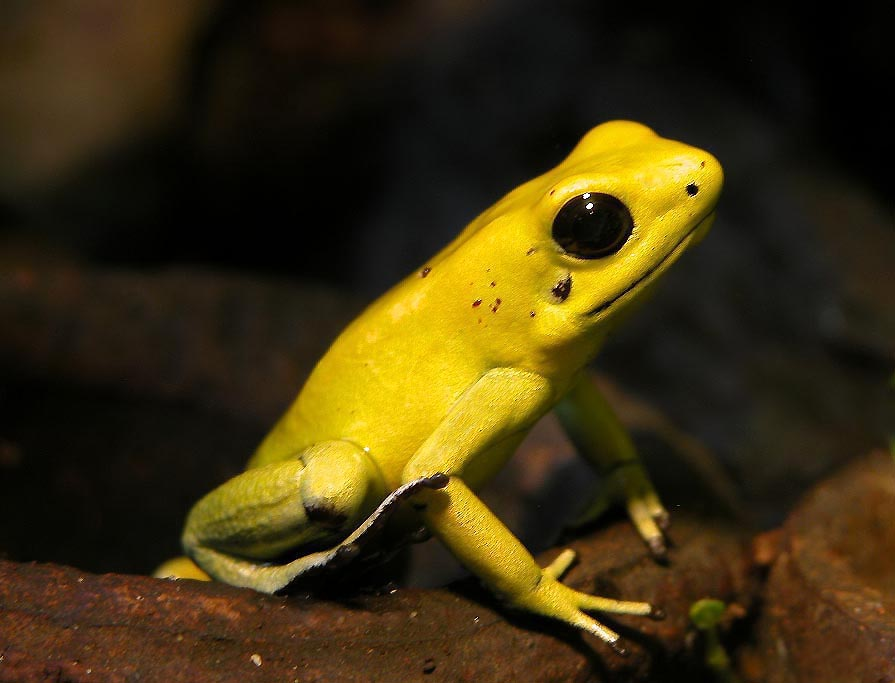
Golden poison frog (Phyllobates terribilis)

Because frog toxins are extraordinarily diverse, they have raised the interest of biochemists as a "natural pharmacy". The alkaloid epibatidine, a painkiller 200 times more potent than morphine, is made by some species of poison dart frogs. Other chemicals isolated from the skins of frogs may offer resistance to HIV infection. Dart poisons are under active investigation for their potential as therapeutic drugs.

It has long been suspected that pre-Columbian Mesoamericans used a toxic secretion produced by the cane toad as a hallucinogen, but more likely they used substances secreted by the Colorado River toad (Bufo alvarius). These contain bufotenin (5-MeO-DMT), a psychoactive compound that has been used in modern times as a recreational drug. Typically, the skin secretions are dried and then smoked. Illicit drug use by licking the skin of a toad has been reported in the media, but this may be an urban myth.

Exudations from the skin of the golden poison frog (Phyllobates terribilis) are traditionally used by native Colombians to poison the darts they use for hunting. The tip of the projectile is rubbed over the back of the frog and the dart is launched from a blowgun. The combination of the two alkaloid toxins batrachotoxin and homobatrachotoxin is so powerful, one frog contains enough poison to kill an estimated 22,000 mice. Two other species, the Kokoe poison dart frog (Phyllobates aurotaenia) and the black-legged dart frog (Phyllobates bicolor) are also used for this purpose. These are less toxic and less abundant than the golden poison frog. They are impaled on pointed sticks and may be heated over a fire to maximise the quantity of poison that can be transferred to the dart.

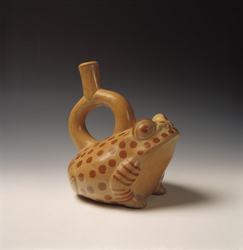
Moche frog sculpture

=== Cultural significance ===
Frogs have been featured in mythology, fairy tales and popular culture. In traditional Chinese myths, the world rests on a giant frog, who would try to swallow the moon, causing the lunar eclipse. Frogs have been featured in religion, folklore, and popular culture. The ancient Egyptians depicted the god Heqet, protector of newborns, with the head of a frog. For the Mayans, frogs represented water, crops, fertility and birth and were associated with the god Chaac. In the Bible, Moses unleashes a plague of frogs on the Egyptians. Medieval Europeans associated frogs and toads with evil and witchcraft. The Brothers Grimm fairy tale The Frog Prince features a princess taking in a frog and it turning into a handsome prince. In modern culture, frogs may take a comedic or hapless role, such as Mr. Toad of the 1908 novel The Wind in the Willows, Michigan J. Frog of Warner Bros. Cartoons, Kermit the Frog of The Muppets, and in the game Frogger.
