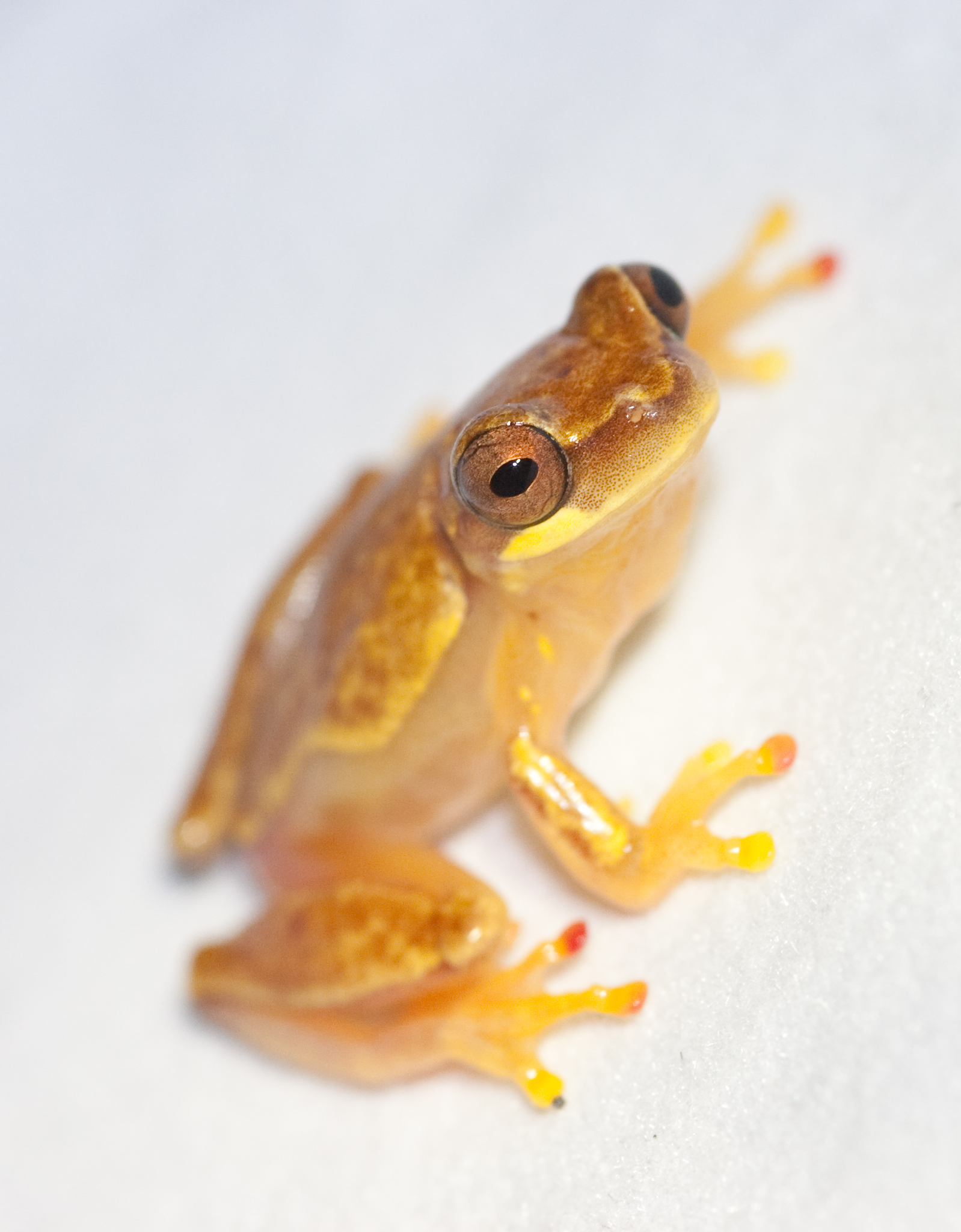
- Hourglass Treefrogs Hyla ebraccata

Scientific classification
- Kingdom: Animalia
- Phylum: Chordata
- Class: Amphibia
- Superorder: Batrachia
- Clade: Salientia; Laurenti, 1768

Subgroups
- †Czatkobatrachus; †Triadobatrachus; †Notobatrachus; Anura (crown group)

= Salientia =

Salientia Temporal range: Early Triassic – Present, 250–0 Ma Possible earlier origin based on molecular clock

Order of amphibians

Salientia (Latin salire, salio meaning "to jump") are a total group of amphibians that includes the order Anura, frogs and toads, and various extinct proto-frogs that are more closely related to frogs than they are to Urodela, salamanders and newts. The oldest fossil "proto-frog" appeared in the early Triassic of Madagascar, but molecular clock dating suggests their origins may extend further back to the Permian, 265 million years ago.

== Characteristics ==
Very few fossils of early salientians have been found, which makes defining the characteristics of the group and their taxonomic relationships difficult. The arrangement of pectoral elements and the number of vertebrae are some guides, but the degree of vertebral articulation and the arrangement of the bones in their legs have not been found to be reliable indicators. The early proto-frogs developed from temnospondyl ancestors in which some of the elements of their vertebrae remained separate. The structure of the salientian pelvis and hind limb was probably developed for swimming rather than jumping. From the structure of the vertebrae, the group appears not to be monophyletic. The evolution of salientians seems to have been rapid and radiative. The essential features of recent groupings seem to have been established during the Mesozoic or early Tertiary. The families Alytidae, Pipidae, and Pelobatidae are ecologically isolated, harlequin frogs, restricted to a neotropical range in Central and South America, and Ranidae and Bufonidae likely radiated from tropical regions of Africa and Asia.

== Evolution ==
The origins and evolutionary relationships between the three main groups of amphibians are hotly debated. A molecular phylogeny based on rDNA analysis dating from 2005 suggests that salamanders and caecilians are more closely related to each other than they are to frogs, and the divergence of the three groups took place in the Paleozoic or early Mesozoic before the breakup of the supercontinent Pangaea and soon after their divergence from lobe-finned fishes. This would help account for the relative scarcity of amphibian fossils from the period before the groups split. Another molecular phylogenetic analysis conducted about the same time concluded lissamphibians first appeared about 330 million years ago and that the temnospondyl-origin hypothesis is more credible than other theories. Neobatrachians seemed to have originated in Africa/India, the salamanders in East Asia and the caecilians in tropical Pangaea. Other researchers, while agreeing with the main thrust of this study, questioned the choice of calibration points used to synchronise the data. They proposed that the date of lissamphibian diversification be put in the Permian, rather less than 300 million years ago, a date in better agreement with the palaeontological data. A further study in 2011 using both extinct and living taxa sampled for morphological, as well as molecular data, came to the conclusion that the Lissamphibia are monophyletic and should be nested within the Lepospondyli group rather than within the Temnospondyli group. The study postulated the Lissamphibia originated no earlier than the late Carboniferous, some 290 to 305 million years ago. The split between Anura and Caudata was estimated as taking place 292 million years ago, rather later than most molecular studies suggest, with the caecilians splitting off 239 million years ago.

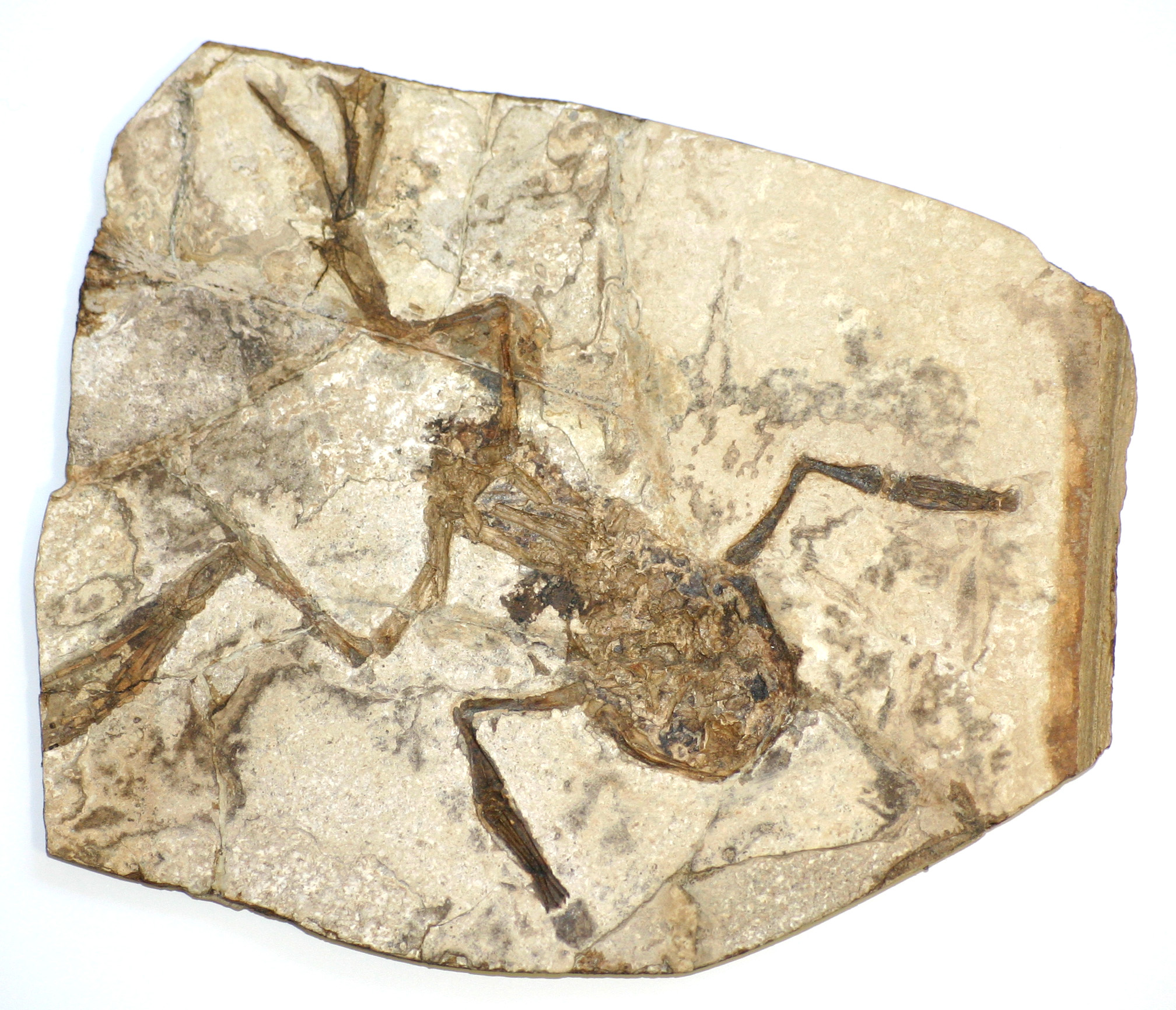
A fossilized frog from the Czech Republic, possibly Palaeobatrachus gigas

In 2008, Gerobatrachus hottoni, a temnospondyl with many frog- and salamander-like characteristics, was discovered in Texas. It dated back 290 million years and was hailed as a missing link, a stem batrachian close to the common ancestor of frogs and salamanders, consistent with the widely accepted hypothesis that frogs and salamanders are more closely related to each other (forming a clade called the Batrachia) than they are to caecilians. However, others have suggested that Gerobatrachus hottoni was only a dissorophoid temnospondyl unrelated to extant amphibians. The earliest known salientians (see below), closer to the extant frogs than to the extant salamanders, are Triadobatrachus massinoti, from the Early Triassic of Madagascar (about 250 million years ago), and the fragmentary Czatkobatrachus polonicus from the Early Triassic of Poland (about the same age as Triadobatrachus). The skull of Triadobatrachus is frog-like, being broad with large eye sockets, but the fossil has features diverging from modern frogs. These include a longer body with more vertebrae. The tail has separate vertebrae, unlike the fused urostyle or coccyx found in modern frogs. The tibia and fibula bones are also separate, making it probable that Triadobatrachus was not an efficient leaper. Proto-frogs, such as Triadobatrachus and Czatkobatrachus, possessed 14 presacral vertebrae (modern frogs have eight or nine), a long and forward-sloping ilium in the pelvis, a frontoparietal bone, and a lower jaw without teeth.

== Species ==
The earliest salientian yet discovered is Triadobatrachus massinoti, known from a single fossil specimen found in Madagascar. It dates back to the Early Triassic, about 250 million years ago. It had many frog-like features, but had 14 presacral vertebrae, while modern frogs have nine or 10. Previous fossil amphibians had many more presacral vertebrae than this and T. massinoti provides a missing link between salamanders and frogs. Other characteristics that distinguish it from modern frogs include the possession of a short tail with unfused vertebrae, a separate radius and ulna in the fore limb, and separate tibia and fibula in the hind limb. The features it shares with modern frogs include a forward-sloping ilium, the fusion of the frontal and parietal bones into a single structure known as the frontoparietal, and a lower jaw bone with no teeth.

Czatkobatrachus is another proto-frog with some characteristics similar to Triadobatrachus. It is from the early Triassic in Poland and has a shortened vertebral column, reduced tail, and elongated ilium.

Another early proto-frog was Prosalirus bitis, several fossil specimens of which have been found in Arizona. It dates back to the Early Jurassic, 190 million years ago. It has primitive features, but has a urostyle and an elongated, forward-directed ilium in its pelvis. These adaptations made it better able to absorb the impact of landing after a jump.

Dating back to a similar date is Vieraella herbsti, a single specimen of which has been found in Santa Cruz Province, Argentina. It had 10 presacral vertebrae, but is considered to be more basal than Notobatrachus and living frogs.

Several specimens of Notobatrachus degiustoi have been found in Patagonia, Argentina. They date back to the Middle Jurassic, 160 million years ago. Whether it should be considered the first modern frog or be placed in a sister group to Anura is uncertain.

== Phylogeny ==
- Amphibia
  - - Batrachia
      - Salientia
      - Caudata – Salamanders and newts
    - - Albanerpetontidae – Extinct
      - Gymnophiona – Caecilians

Cladogram from Tree of Life Web Project.
