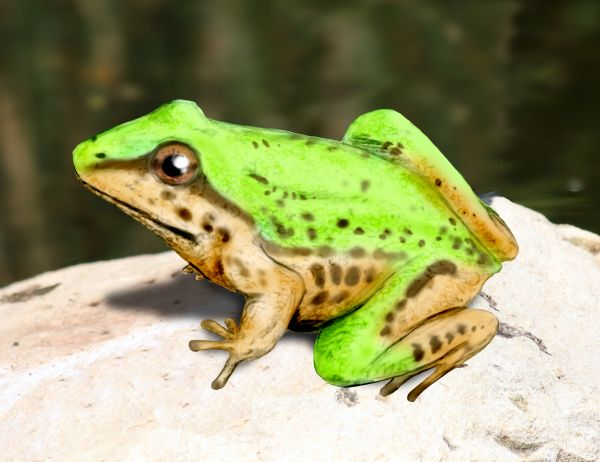

Scientific classification
- Kingdom: Animalia
- Phylum: Chordata
- Class: Amphibia
- Clade: Salientia
- Genus: †Notobatrachus; Reig 1956

Species
- N. degiustoi Reig 1956 (type); N. reigi Báez & Nicoli 2008

= Notobatrachus =

Notobatrachus Temporal range: Middle-Late Toarcian to Bajocian ~179–168 Ma

Extinct genus of amphibians

Notobatrachus is an extinct genus of frog from the Lower Jurassic (Toarcian) Cañadon Asfalto Formation, Cañadón Asfalto Basin and Middle Jurassic La Matilde Formation, Deseado Massif of Patagonia, Argentina. N. degiustoi is the most completely known Jurassic frog and has been recorded in many outcrops of the La Matilde Formation of the Deseado Massif in southern Patagonia.

== Description ==
Most of the specimens of N. degiustoi are post-metamorphic individuals, with the largest individuals reaching body lengths of 15 centimetres (5.9 in), making them among the largest known frogs of the Mesozoic era, and comparable in size to many large modern frogs. CPBA-V-14003 consists of disarticulated cranial and postcranial elements, and may correspond either to a late metamorphosing tadpole or an early post-metamorphic individual.

In 2024, a tadpole specimen of N. degiustoi (MPM-PV 23540) was reported from the La Matilde Formation of Argentina, representing the oldest known tadpole and the first stem-anuran larva in the fossil record. Tadpoles of this species reached lengths of 15.9 centimetres (6.3 in), among the largest recorded in frogs living or extinct.

== Ecology ==
Notobatrachus degiustoi lived in a floodplain environment that varied from being seasonally wet to seasonally dry. Tadpoles of Notobatrachus degiustoi are thought to have lived in ephemeral ponds that formed and disappeared seasonally. Like many living tadpoles, they are thought to have been filter feeders.

== Taxonomy ==
Notobatrachus is thought to be a member of the stem-group of Anura, with all living frogs more closely related to each other than Notobatrachus, though Notobatrachus is more closely related to modern frogs than earlier salientians like Triadobatrachus, Czatkobatrachus, and Prosalirus.
