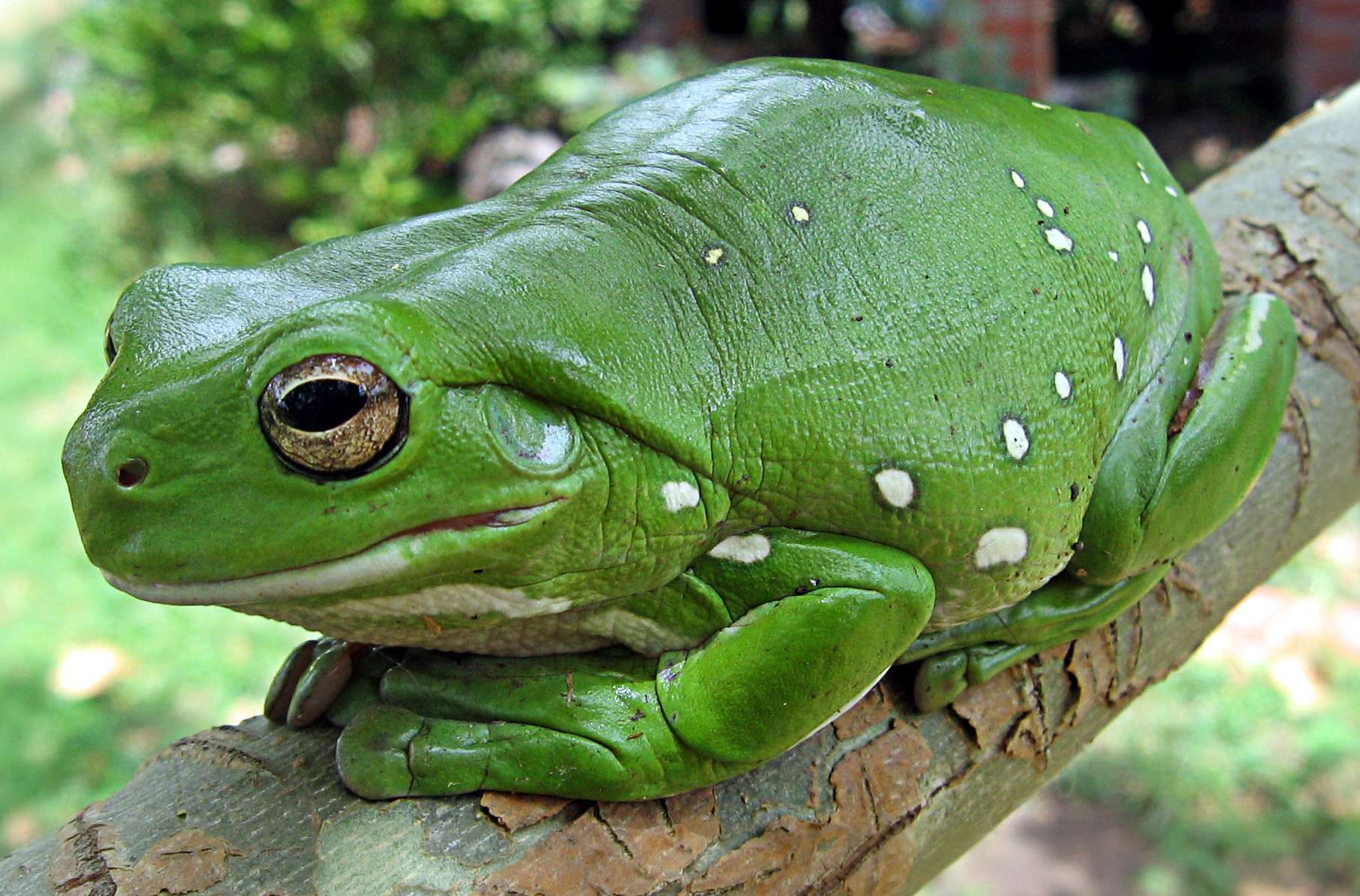
- Australian green tree frog (Litoria caerulea)
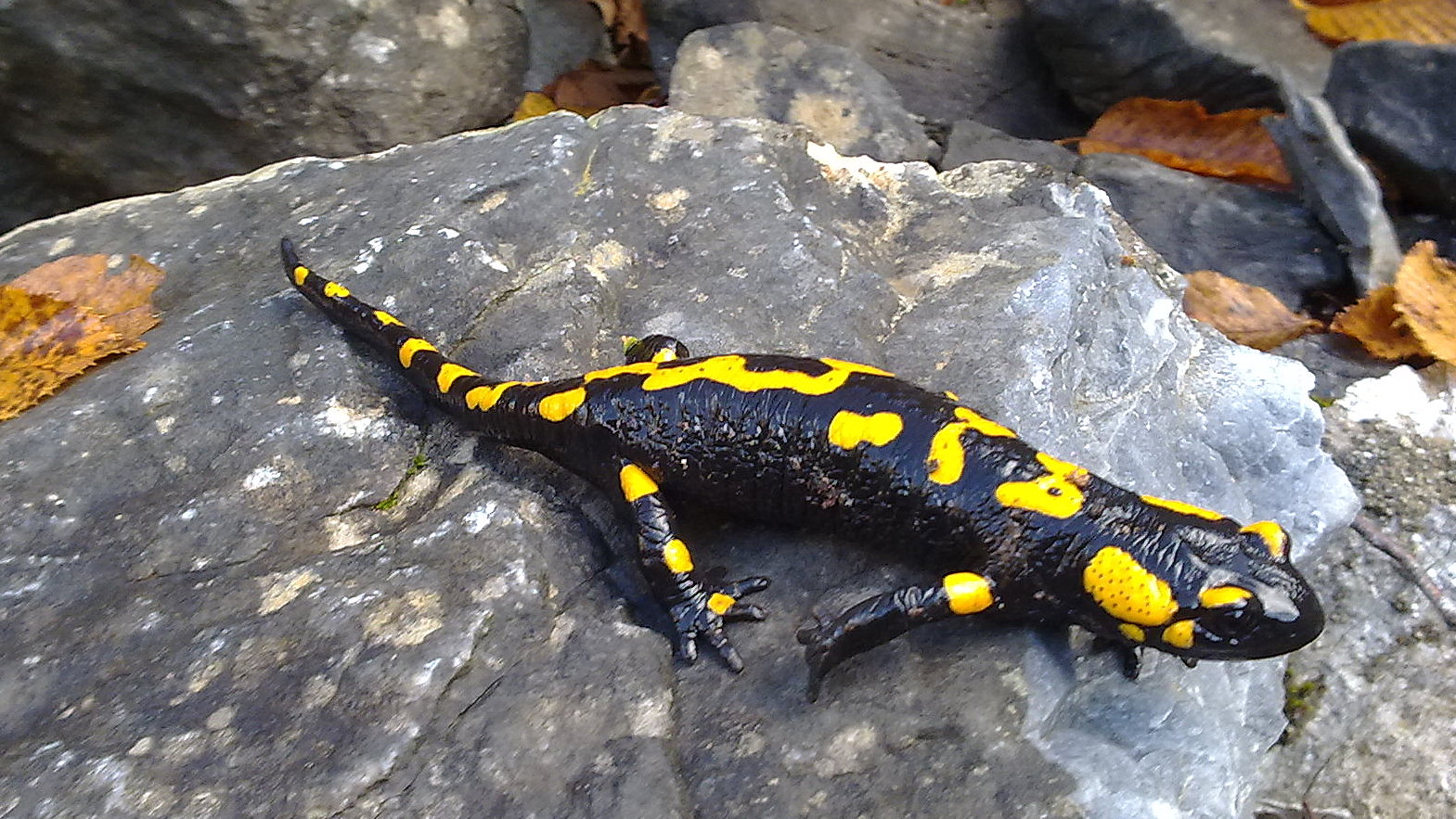
- Fire salamander (Salamandra salamandra)

Scientific classification
- Kingdom: Animalia
- Phylum: Chordata
- Class: Amphibia
- Subclass: Lissamphibia
- Superorder: Batrachia; Latreille, 1800

Clades
- Caudata; Salientia

Synonyms
- Batraciens Brongniart, 1800

= Batrachia =

Batrachia Temporal range: Early Triassic – Present, 250–0 Ma Possible earlier origin based on molecular clock

Clade of amphibians

The Batrachia /bəˈtreɪkiə/ are a clade of amphibians that includes frogs and salamanders, but not caecilians nor the extinct allocaudates. The name Batrachia was first used by French zoologist Pierre André Latreille in 1800 to refer to frogs, but has more recently been defined in a phylogenetic sense as a node-based taxon that includes the last common ancestor of frogs and salamanders and all of its descendants. The idea that frogs and salamanders are more closely related to each other than either is to caecilians is strongly supported by morphological and molecular evidence; they are, for instance, the only vertebrates able to raise and lower their eyes. However, an alternative hypothesis exists in which salamanders and caecilians are each other's closest relatives as part of a clade called the Procera, with frogs positioned as the sister taxon of this group.

== Origins ==
The earliest batrachians are the stem-frogs Triadobatrachus and Czatkobatrachus from the Early Triassic, about 250 million years ago. However, several molecular clock estimates place the first appearance of the Batrachia (the time at which frog and salamander lineages diverged from each other) before the Early Triassic. Most estimates place the divergence in the Permian but some put it as far back as 367 million years ago in the Late Devonian (which is when tetrapods are thought to have started to emerge from fishapods). However, there is no evidence of lissamphibians or lissamphibian-like animals in the fossil record at this time. The tetrapod groups that are hypothesized as ancestors of modern amphibians (lepospondyls and amphibamid temnospondyls) appear in the Late Carboniferous, roughly 300 million years ago. Large fossil tetrapod assemblages are known from the Artinskian stage of the Early Permian about 275 million years ago and contain no lissamphibians, suggesting that the Early Permian may be an upper bound for the age of Batrachia.

Batrachians are united by the presence of the batrachian operculum in the middle ear, a feature currently considered absent among caecilians and stem-lissamphibians.
