= Antlerpeton =

Antlerpeton Temporal range: Early Carboniferous, 330 Ma

Scientific classification
- Kingdom: Animalia
- Phylum: Chordata
- Clade: Stegocephali
- Genus: †Antlerpeton; Thomson et al., 1998

Species
- †A. clarkii Thomson et al., 1998 (type)

Extinct genus of tetrapods

Antlerpeton is an extinct genus of early tetrapod from the Early Carboniferous of Nevada. It is known from a single poorly preserved skeleton from the Diamond Peak Formation of Eureka County. A mix of features in its compound vertebrae suggest that Antlerpeton is a primitive stem tetrapod that has affinities with later, more advanced forms. Its robust pelvis and hind limbs allowed for effective locomotion on land, but the animal was likely still tied to a semiaquatic lifestyle near the coast.

== Description and history ==
The holotype skeleton of Antlerpeton, ANS VP 19909, is the only known specimen of the genus. It was found in a block of mudstone in the form of fragmentary bones and natural molds. A latex impression was made to study ANS VP 19909 in greater detail. No other plant or animal fossils were found in the surrounding area. Antlerpeton was first described by Keith Stewart Thomson, Neil Shubin, and Forrest Poole in 1998. It was named after the Antler highlands, a group of mountains in Nevada and Utah that formed during the Late Devonian and Early Carboniferous. The type species A. clarkii was named for Charles W. Clark, a geologist of the Western Mining Corporation (an Australian mining company with an exploration office in Reno, Nevada) who discovered the holotype in 1990.

The holotype of Antlerpeton consists of vertebrae, ribs, a pelvic girdle, two broken femora, and gastralia. All of the bones are articulated. With up to 28 vertebrae, the presacral vertebral column (the part of the column in front of the pelvic girdle) is long. Each vertebral segment is composed of a large principal centrum and a pair of two small bones that fit in front of it. The spinal cord passes through the larger bones, while the smaller bones are positioned to either side of the midline. Pubo-ischiadic plates, primitive forms of the pubis and ischium of later tetrapods, are present, but it is unclear whether they were fused into a strong pelvic girdle. A small projection of bone is present on the acetabulum, a depression in the pelvis that attaches with the end of the femur. This projection is also seen in the Late Devonian tetrapod Ichthyostega. The femur of Antlerpeton is much more robust than that of Ichthyostega, and has prominent ridges like the fourth trochanter that are attachment points for well-developed leg muscles. Antlerpeton also has small scales covering its underside.

== Classification ==
Because the only specimen of Antlerpeton is incomplete and lacks a skull, its relationships with other early tetrapods are poorly understood. The compound vertebrae of Antlerpeton distinguish it from lepospondyls and ally it with more primitive stem tetrapods. Antlerpeton shows characteristics of both early rhachitomous tetrapods and later schizomerous tetrapods. Rhachitomous tetrapods have two types of bones in each vertebral segment: the pleurocentrum and the intercentrum. The intercentrum is the larger of the two bones in rhachitomes, while the pleurocentra are present as two smaller bones in a dorsal position between the intercentra.

Schizomerous tetrapods differ from rhachitomes in that their pleurocentra have descended to a more ventral position in the vertebral column. The pleurocentra enlarged in reptiliomorphs to become the main element of the vertebral centrum. While the compound vertebrae of Antlerpeton are similar to those of classic rhachitomes, the pleurocentra form a distinctive connection with the intercentra in front of and behind them. This pattern is called the anteropleural condition because the paired pleurocentra are associated with the anterior face of the intercentrum behind them. The anteropleural condition is seen in other forms like Whatcheeria, which are generally considered to be advanced rhachitomes. However, it is also seen in lobe-finned fish like Lohsania, suggesting that the feature is not unique to derived early tetrapods.

== Paleobiology ==
Antlerpeton had several adaptations for a terrestrial lifestyle. While early tetrapods like Ichthyostega and Acanthostega were mostly aquatic, Antlerpeton could probably move effectively on land with its robust legs and pelvic girdle. The femur is large, and many bony ridges provide anchorage for muscles that would have been useful for both swimming and moving on land. The thickened pubis and acetabulum of the pelvic girdle and the large sacral vertebrae that connect it with the vertebral column allowed Antlerpeton to withstand the stresses of terrestrial locomotion. The holotype specimen of Antlerpeton was found in rocks that were deposited in coastal and marine settings. Therefore, it is likely that Antlerpeton inhabited rivers or marshes near the coast and had some tolerance of salt water.
