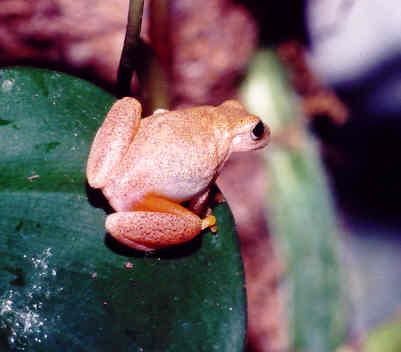

Conservation status
- Least Concern (IUCN 3.1)

Scientific classification
- Kingdom: Animalia
- Phylum: Chordata
- Class: Amphibia
- Order: Anura
- Family: Hylidae
- Genus: Dendropsophus
- Species: D. phlebodes

Binomial name
- Dendropsophus phlebodes (Stejneger, 1906)

Synonyms
- Hyla phlebodes Stejneger, 1906

= Dendropsophus phlebodes =

Species of frog

Dendropsophus phlebodes, the San Carlos treefrog or San Carlos dwarf treefrog, is a species of frog in the family Hylidae. It is found in western Colombia, Costa Rica, Nicaragua and Panama. Its natural habitats are tropical moist lowland forests, but it may also occur in disturbed habitats. It is threatened by habitat loss.

== Description ==
The San Carlos treefrog is a small, sturdy species with the female growing to a snout–vent length of 28 millimetres (1.1 in) while the males are slightly smaller. This frog has a blunt snout and a wide head and the tympanum is partially concealed by a fold of skin. There is a single vocal sac in the throat and a pair of vocal slits. The fore-legs are short and the long, slender fingers have large flattened pads at the tips. The hind legs are short but powerful and the long toes are partially webbed and have expanded tips. The skin on the dorsal surface is smooth and has a pale brown colour with slight darker patterning. The ventral surface is granular and white, blending to cream and yellow on the inside of the thighs. The iris is yellowish-bronze and during the breeding season, the male's vocal sac is yellow. The confused D. phlebodes is sometimes confused with other frogs within its same genus. The D. ebraccatus can be distinguished by the hourglass pattern on its back. Additionally, D. phlebodes have shorter primary calling notes.

== Distribution and habitat ==
The San Carlos treefrog is a nocturnal, lowland species found on Pacific northwestern Colombia (Chocó and Risaralda Departments) and Panama, as well as on the Atlantic slopes of Panama, Costa Rica, and Nicaragua. Its natural habitat is humid forest where it breeds in shallow pools. It does not generally occur at greater elevations than 700 metres (2,300 ft) above sea level. It is also often found in cultivated land, swampy meadows, and drainage ditches.

== Biology ==
The San Carlos treefrog is a generalist predator feeding on small terrestrial invertebrates such as spiders, moth larvae and fly larvae.

It is an "explosive breeder", the main reproductive period starting with the arrival of the rainy season. The males are stimulated by heavy rain to congregate, calling from low vegetation beside temporary pools or flooded fields. Many males may synchronise their calls and in Panama, this species is often joined by Dendropsophus microcephalus and Dendropsophus ebraccatus in a joint chorus. The eggs are laid in clusters of about four hundred eggs and deposited among plants growing in shallow water.

== Status ==
The San Carlos treefrog is listed as being of "least concern" in the IUCN Red List of Threatened Species. It is considered to have a stable population, is common over a wide range and is relatively adaptable. Its greatest threat may be pollution of the waters in which it breeds.
