= Farish Jenkins =

American paleontologist

Farish Alston Jenkins
- On safari in Tanzania.
- Born: 19 May 1940; New York City
- Died: 11 November 2012 (aged 72); Boston
- Education: Princeton University
- Awards: Romer-Simpson Medal (2009)
- Scientific career
- Workplaces: Harvard University; Columbia University
- Thesis: The Postcranial Skeleton of African Cynodonts and Problems in the Evolution of Mammalian Postcranial Anatomy (1969)

Farish Alston Jenkins (May 19, 1940 – November 11, 2012) was a professor at Harvard University who studied and taught paleontology. His discoveries included a transitional creature with characteristics of both fish and land animals, Tiktaalik roseae, and one of the earliest known frogs, Prosalirus bitis.

== Early life ==
Farish Jenkins was born in Manhattan on May 19, 1940. He was the oldest of three sons of a marketing executive but was raised by his grandmother in Colorado while his father served in World War II.

Jenkins studied geology at Princeton, where he met his wife Eleanor Tracy. He served in the United States Marine Corps for four years, where he became a captain.

After arriving to Yale in 1964 to continue his studies in geology, Jenkins took a trip to Nairobi where he is said to have taken his first interest in live animal research: "At the time, black rhinos in the bush were as thick as rats in a dump. With my camera set on self-timer, I managed to pose with one before the beast came on with a charge. I barely made it back to my Morris Minor in time, lost a lens cap on the way, but became, as a result of those three weeks, as much intrigued by living vertebrates as by their extinct relatives."

He obtained his masters and doctorate from Yale and was the school's first graduate student to enroll in courses at the medical school, studying anatomy and embryology.

== Academic career ==
Jenkins went on to teach at both Columbia and Harvard. In his later life, Jenkins served at Harvard as a professor of biology, the Alexander Agassiz Professor of Zoology and curator of vertebrate paleontology at the Museum of Comparative Zoology.

Jenkins made numerous expeditions to the Arctic, including a dozen expeditions to the Triassic of Jameson Land in Greenland, and to other sites from East Africa to Wyoming. He is credited as having helped explain the fish-to-tetrapod evolutionary transition as he helped discover the 375 million year old Tiktaalik roseae. His trips were subsidized by an anonymous benefactor named Rose and were so strenuous that a colleague of 30 years, Neil Shubin, called them "pure Calvinist".

In 1981 he discovered a pile of four frog-like skeletons in the Arizona desert, which initially looked like road kill, and with Neil Shubin he studied the fossils for 14 years. They were eventually described as the early frog Prosalirus bitis. In 2008, he analyzed fossils from Greenland of Gerrothorax pulcherrimus, an early amphibian from about 210 million years ago that used its upper jaw to open its mouth. Jenkins called it the "ugliest animal in the world".

Jenkins was known for his eccentricity as a professor. When lecturing on the subject of gait, he would illustrate this by walking on a peg leg as the character Captain Ahab from Herman Melville's Moby Dick. He was known for taking front row students' shoes in order to examine their wear patterns. On expeditions he dressed in the dashing style of Indiana Jones, donning a Czechoslovak rabbit fur hat and carrying a gun and a flask of vodka. He was known to set up systems of wires and automatic rifles to deter polar bears.

He used cineradiography to take internal pictures of animals moving in various ways. These could be quite elaborate and exciting, using treadmills and a wind tunnel. "Tree shrews ricocheted across my bookshelves and desk," he reminisced.

He helped to remove Lawrence Summers from the office of Harvard president.

== Personal life ==
At Princeton, Jenkins drove a fellow student, Eleanor Tracy, to a train station more than an hour away. They dated during college and through his military service, and starting in the mid 1970s they lived on an apple orchard in New Hampshire. They had a son and a daughter.

Jenkins was known for his foul language. He made homemade cider from apples he grew and trapped chipmunks that disrupted his barn. After being diagnosed with cancer, he said "as a paleontologist, I'm familiar with extinction." He died from pneumonia at Brigham and Women's Hospital on November 11, 2012.
