= Neil Shubin =

American scientist (born 1960)

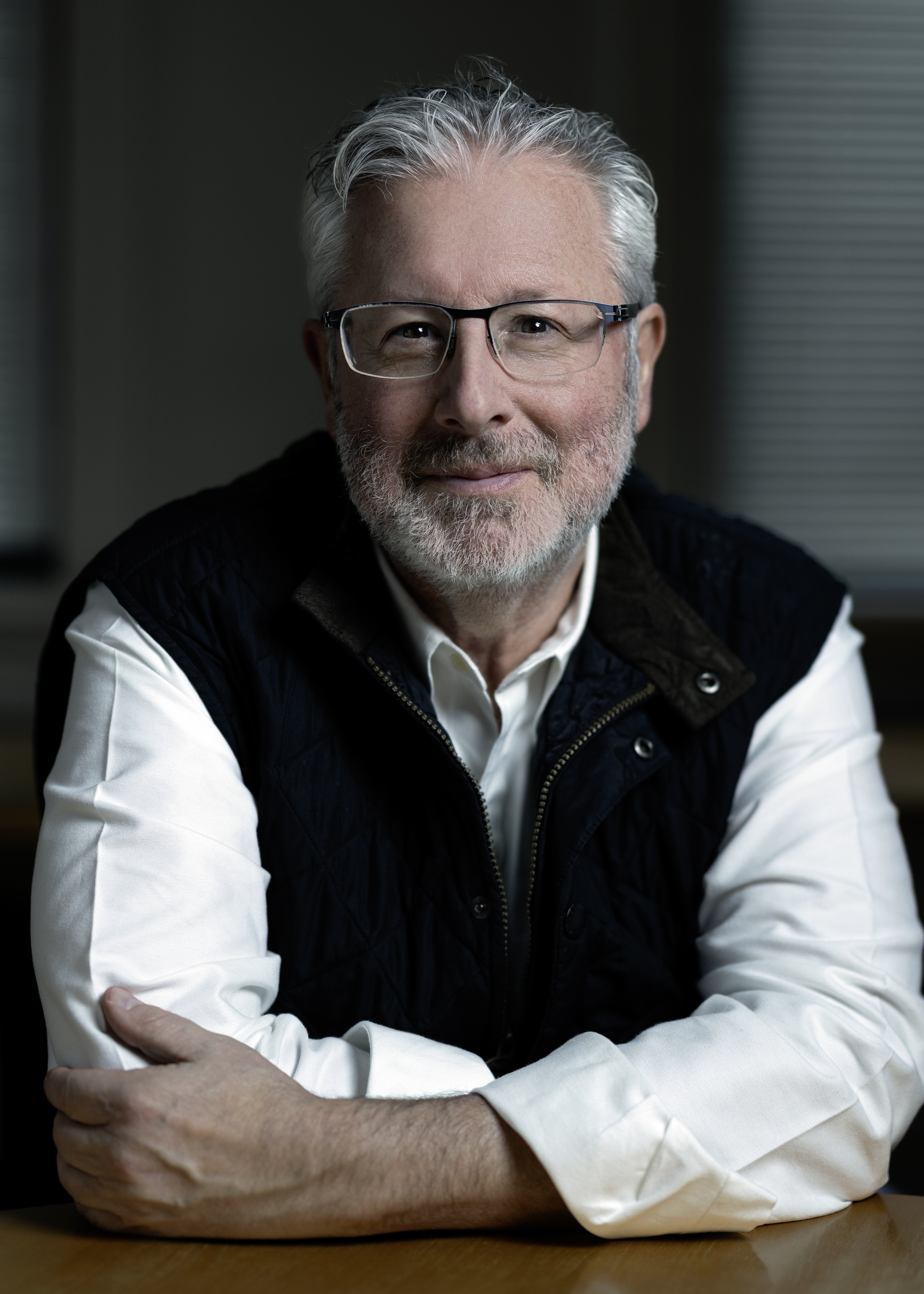
- Shubin at the University of Chicago
- Born: December 22, 1960 (age 65); Philadelphia, Pennsylvania, U.S.
- Education: Columbia University (A.B.); Harvard University (Ph.D.)
- Known for: Discovery of Tiktaalik roseae and evolutionary developmental biology
- Awards: Miller Research Fellowship; Guggenheim Fellowship; National Academy of Sciences National Academy of Sciences 2015 Communication Award with Michael Rosenfeld and David Dugan in Film/Radio/TV for "Your Inner Fish"
- Scientific career
- Fields: Evolutionary biology
- Workplaces: University of Chicago; Field Museum of Natural History
- Thesis: The morphogenesis and origin of the skeletal pattern of the tetrapod limb (1987)
- Website: uchicago.edu/neil-h-shubin

Neil Shubin (born December 22, 1960) is an American paleontologist, evolutionary biologist, popular science writer and the current president of the National Academy of Sciences. He is the Robert R. Bensley Professor of Organismal Biology and Anatomy, Associate Dean of Organismal Biology and Anatomy and Professor on the Committee of Evolutionary Biology at the University of Chicago along with being the Provost of the Field Museum of Natural History. He is best known for his co-discovery of Tiktaalik roseae with Ted Daeschler and Farish Jenkins.

On July 1, 2026, Shubin took office as the president of the National Academy of Sciences.

== Biography ==
Born to the author Seymour Shubin and his wife Gloria and raised in Overbrook Hills section of Lower Merion Township (contiguous to City of Philadelphia) and a graduate of Lower Merion High School, Shubin earned a A.B. from Columbia University in 1982 and a Ph.D. in organismic and evolutionary biology from Harvard University in 1987. He also studied at the University of California, Berkeley.

Shubin was elected to the National Academy of Sciences in 2011.

Shubin was ABC News' "Person of the Week" in April 2006 when Tiktaalik was unveiled, and made appearances on The Colbert Report January 14, 2008 and January 9, 2013.

The Communication Awards of the National Academies of Sciences, Engineering, and Medicine awarded a $20,000 prize for excellence in communicating science to the general public to Michael Rosenfeld, David Dugan, and Neil Shubin in Film/Radio/TV on October 14, 2015, for Your Inner Fish. The awards are given to individuals in four categories: books, film/radio/TV, magazine/newspaper and online, and are supported by the W. M. Keck Foundation. Neil Shubin hosted Your Inner Fish on PBS. The show was produced by Windfall Films and Tangled Bank Studios, a production company for the Howard Hughes Medical Institute that makes materials available for science classroom education.

He was elected to the American Philosophical Society in 2017. He also served as interim co-director of the Marine Biological Laboratory in 2017.

In 2026, Shubin was elected president of the National Academy of Sciences, succeeding Marcia McNutt when her final term ends on June 30, 2026.

Below is a list of taxa that Shubin has contributed to naming:

| Year | Taxon | Authors |
|---|---|---|
| 2022 | Qikiqtania wakei gen. et sp. nov. | Stewart, Lemberg, Daly, Daeschler & Shubin |
| 2019 | Asterolepis alticristata sp. nov. | Downs, Daeschler, Lo, Carey & Shubin |
| 2018 | Eusthenopteron jenkinsi sp. nov. | Downs, Daeschler, Long & Shubin |
| 2017 | Cyclotosaurus naraserluki sp. nov. | Marzola, Mateus, Shubin & Clemmensen |
| 2016 | Bothriolepis rex sp. nov. | Downs, Daeschler, Garcia & Shubin |
| 2012 | Beiyanerpeton jianpingensis gen. et sp. nov. | Gao & Shubin |
| 2011 | Laccognathus embryi sp. nov. | Downs, Daeschler, Jenkins & Shubin |
| 2011 | Diodorus scytobrachion gen. et sp. nov. | Kammerer, Nesbitt & Shubin |
| 2006 | Tiktaalik roseae gen. et sp. nov. | Daeschler, Shubin & Jenkins |
| 2003 | Chunerpeton tianyiensis gen. et sp. nov. | Gao & Shubin |
| 2003 | Equijubus normani gen. et sp. nov. | You, Luo, Shubin, Witmer, Tang & Tang |
| 2001 | Eudimorphodon cromptonellus sp. nov. | Jenkins, Shubin, Gatesy & Padian |
| 2001 | Sinerpeton fengshanensis gen. et sp. nov. | Gao & Shubin |
| 1998 | Antlerpeton clarkii gen. et sp. nov. | Thomson, Shubin & Poole |
| 1997 | Haramiyavia clemensi gen. et sp. nov. | Jenkins, Gatesy, Shubin & Amaral |
| 1995 | Prosalirus bitis gen. et sp. nov. | Shubin & Jenkins |
| 1994 | Protosuchus micmac sp. nov. | Sues, Shubin, Olsen & Amaral |
| 1994 | Hynerpeton bassetti gen. et sp. nov. | Daeschler, Shubin, Thomson & Amaral |
| 1994 | Clevosaurus bairdi sp. nov. | Sues, Shubin & Olsen |
| 1991 | Arctotraversodon gen. nov. | Sues, Hopson & Shubin |

== Awards and honors ==
In 2009, Shubin was elected to the American Academy of Arts and Sciences, and in 2011 to the National Academy of Sciences. In 2016, Shubin was awarded the Addison Emery Verrill Medal from the Yale Peabody Museum for his research into limb evolution. In 2019, Shubin was named the recipient of the Roy Chapman Andrews Society Distinguished Explorer Award. Shubin was chosen primarily because of his discoveries to understand the origin of organs in the human body and the connectiveness of all life. In 2024, Shubin was awarded the Viktor Hamburger Outstanding Educator Prize from the Society for Developmental Biology, and in 2026 was awarded the Society for the Study of Evolution Stephen Jay Gould Prize for his research achievements and for advancing public understanding of evolution.

== Publications ==
- Your Inner Fish: A Journey Into the 3.5-Billion-Year History of the Human Body. New York: Pantheon Books, 2008. ISBN 978-0-375-42447-2
- The Universe Within: Discovering the Common History of Rocks, Planets, and People. Pantheon Books, New York City 2013. ISBN 978-0-307-37843-9
- Some Assembly Required: Decoding Four Billion Years of Life, from Ancient Fossils to DNA. New York: Pantheon Books, 2020. ISBN 9781101871331
- Ends of the Earth: Journeys to the Polar Regions in Search of Life, the Cosmos, and Our Future. New York: Dutton, 2025. ISBN 9780593186527
