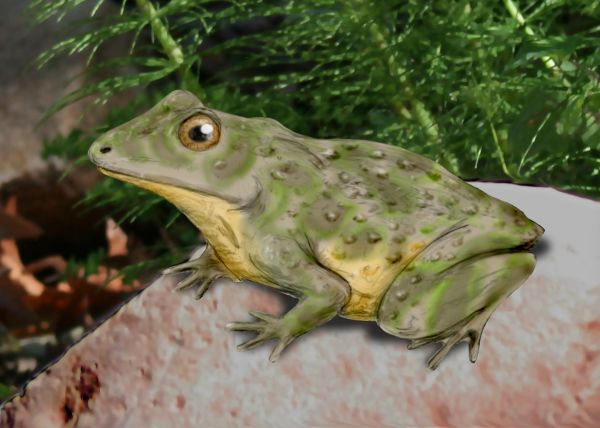
- Restoration

Scientific classification
- Kingdom: Animalia
- Phylum: Chordata
- Class: Amphibia
- Order: Anura
- Family: †Vieraellidae
- Genus: †Vieraella; Reig, 1961

Type species
- †Vieraella herbsti Reig, 1961

= Vieraella =

Vieraella Temporal range: Early Pliensbachian to Toarcian ~189–176 Ma

Extinct genus of amphibians

Vieraella is an extinct genus of frogs from the Lower Jurassic (Early Pliensbachian to Toarcian) Roca Blanca Formation of Argentina, and one of the oldest true frogs known. This genus is known by a single exceptionally well-preserved specimen, P.V.L. 2188, with at least eight presacrals vertebrae, free ribs, ulna and radius not fused, bony skull with some discoglossid characters.

== Description ==
Despite living around 188 million years ago, Vieraella was anatomically very similar to modern frogs. For example, its hind legs were adapted for jumping, and the skull already possessed the lattice-like form found in modern species. It was, however, an unusually small frog, measuring only 3 centimetres (1.2 in) in length. Although older frog-like creatures are known, such as Triadobatrachus, these possessed many primitive characteristics, and cannot be said to be "true" frogs.
