= Ely Limestone =

Geologic formation in Nevada and Utah

- Stratigraphic range: Carboniferous
- Type: Formation
- Overlies: Diamond Peak Formation

Lithology
- Primary: Limestone

Location
- Region: Nevada, Utah
- Country: United States

The Ely Limestone is a geologic formation in Nevada and Utah. It preserves fossils dating back to the Carboniferous period.

== See also ==
- List of fossiliferous stratigraphic units in Utah
- Paleontology in Utah
- List of fossiliferous stratigraphic units in Nevada
- Paleontology in Nevada
