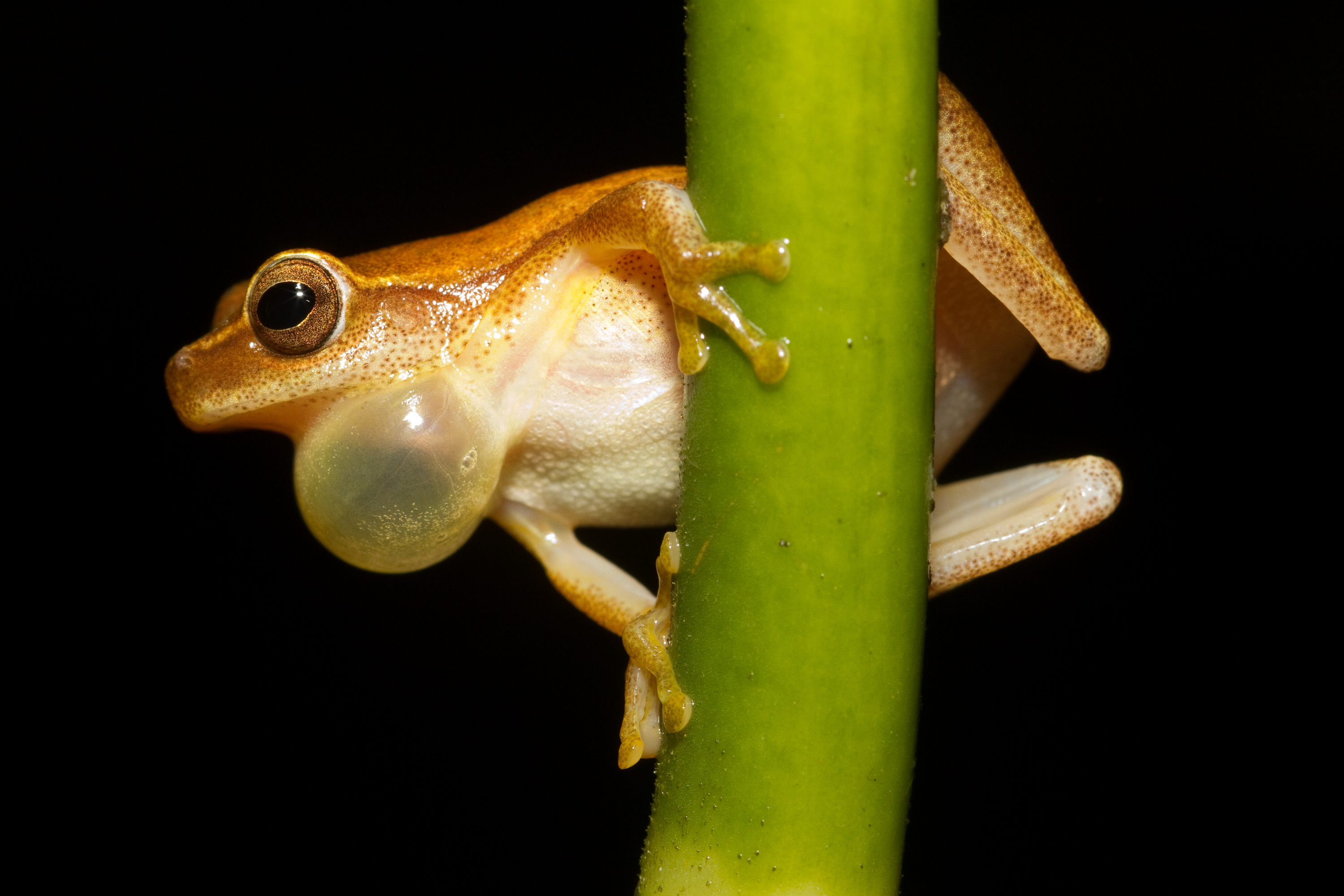
- Calling male

Conservation status
- Least Concern (IUCN 3.1)

Scientific classification
- Kingdom: Animalia
- Phylum: Chordata
- Class: Amphibia
- Order: Anura
- Family: Hylidae
- Genus: Dendropsophus
- Species: D. microcephalus

Binomial name
- Dendropsophus microcephalus (Cope, 1886)

Synonyms
- Hyla microcephala Cope, 1886; Hyla cherrei Cope, 1894; Hyla misera Werner, 1903

= Dendropsophus microcephalus =

Species of frog

Dendropsophus microcephalus is a species of frog in the family Hylidae. It is found in southeastern Mexico (southern Veracruz and northern Oaxaca), Central America (Belize, Costa Rica, El Salvador, Guatemala, Honduras, Nicaragua, Panama), and northern South America in Colombia, Venezuela, Trinidad and Tobago, the Guianas (Guyana, Suriname, French Guiana ), and northern Brazil. This widespread species might actually be a species complex. Its common names include yellow treefrog, small-headed treefrog, and yellow cricket treefrog.

== Description ==
Males grow to about 25 mm (0.98 in) and females 31 mm (1.2 in) in snout–vent length. It is dorsally smooth and pale to bright yellow with two fairly distinct light brown lines that run in parallel down the length of the body. Upper surfaces of the thighs have dark markings. Ventrally it is pale cream or white, possibly with more yellowish throat. The iris is bronze. The D. microcephalus is commonly confused with D. ebraccatus, the hourglass treefrog. The D. microcephalus can be distinguished by its lack of hourglass pattern on its dorsum, and lack of a pale lip strip.

== Habitat and conservation ==
Dendropsophus microcephalus inhabits savanna and forest edge species, often in association with wetlands. It also occurs in disturbed or altered habitats at foothills and low elevations in secondary forests and pasture grasslands or cut-over forests. It can also be found in marshy areas outside or adjacent to forest, including temporarily open areas. Breeding takes place in temporary and permanent pools. It is nocturnal. Its altitudinal range is 0–1,300 m (0–4,265 ft) (to 1,800 m in Colombia) above sea level.

Dendropsophus microcephalus is a very abundant species throughout its range. There are no significant threats to this species that also occurs in many protected areas.
