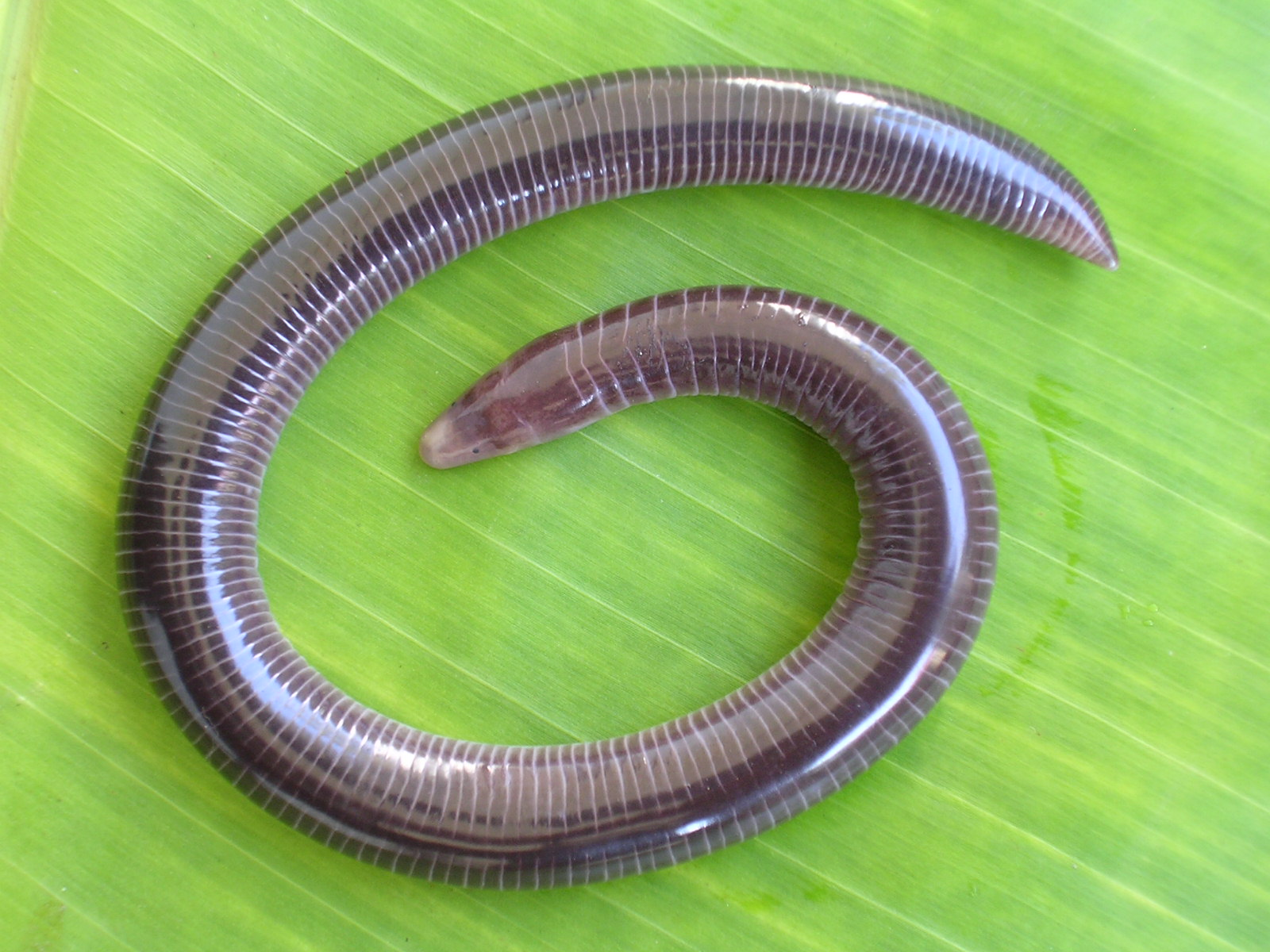
- Kerala caecilian (Uraeotyphlus interruptus)
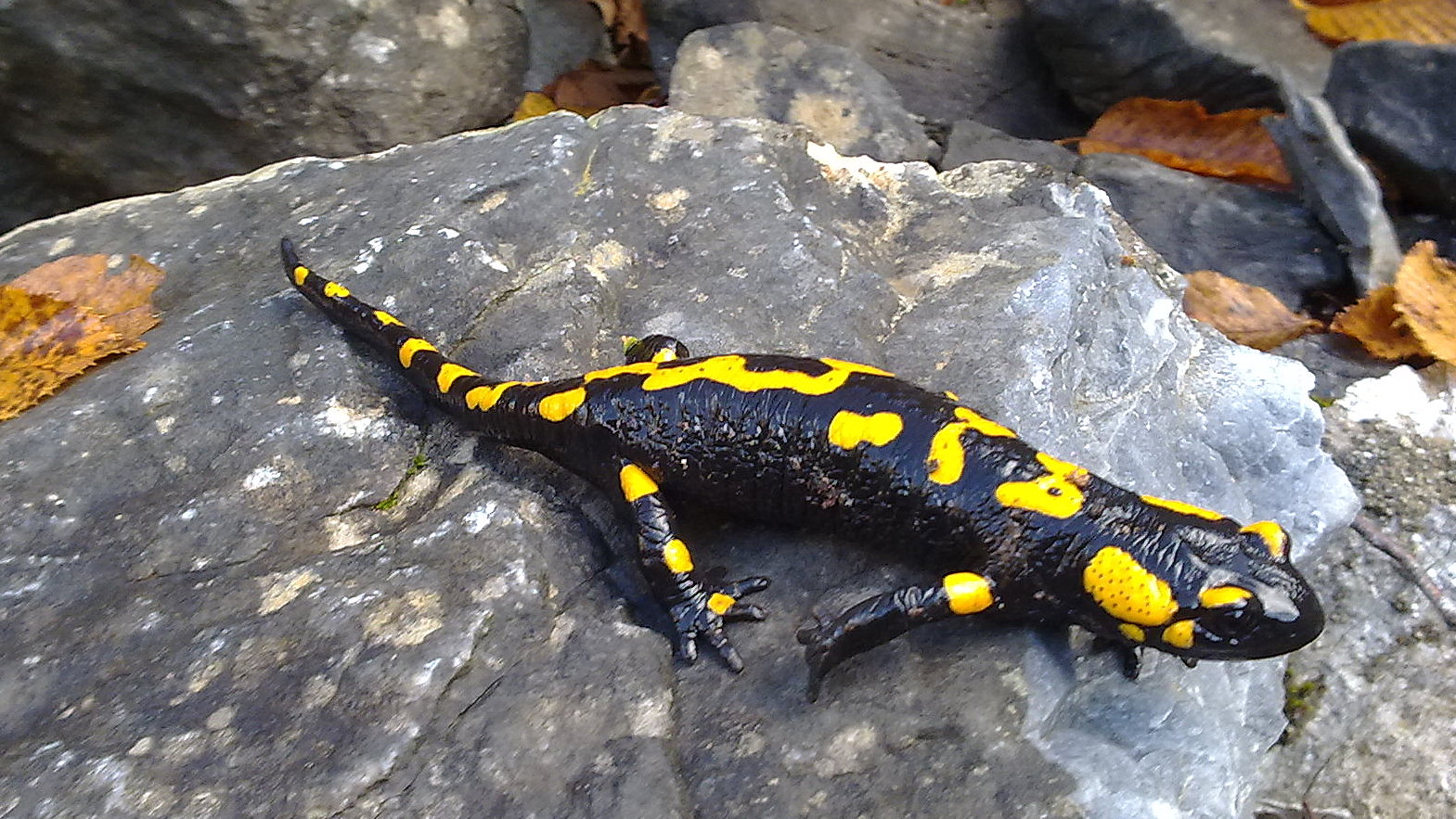
- Fire salamander (Salamandra salamandra)

Scientific classification
- Kingdom: Animalia
- Phylum: Chordata
- Class: Amphibia
- Subclass: Lissamphibia
- Clade: Procera; Feller and Hedges, 1998

Orders
- Gymnophiona; Caudata

= Procera =

Procera Temporal range: Late Triassic - Holocene

Clade of amphibians

Procera is a hypothetical clade of amphibians that includes salamanders and caecilians but not frogs. A close relationship between salamanders and caecilians is a competing hypothesis to the more widely supported view that salamanders and frogs are each other's closest relatives within a clade called Batrachia. Procera was proposed as a clade in 1998 and has been supported by few recent morphological and molecular studies.
