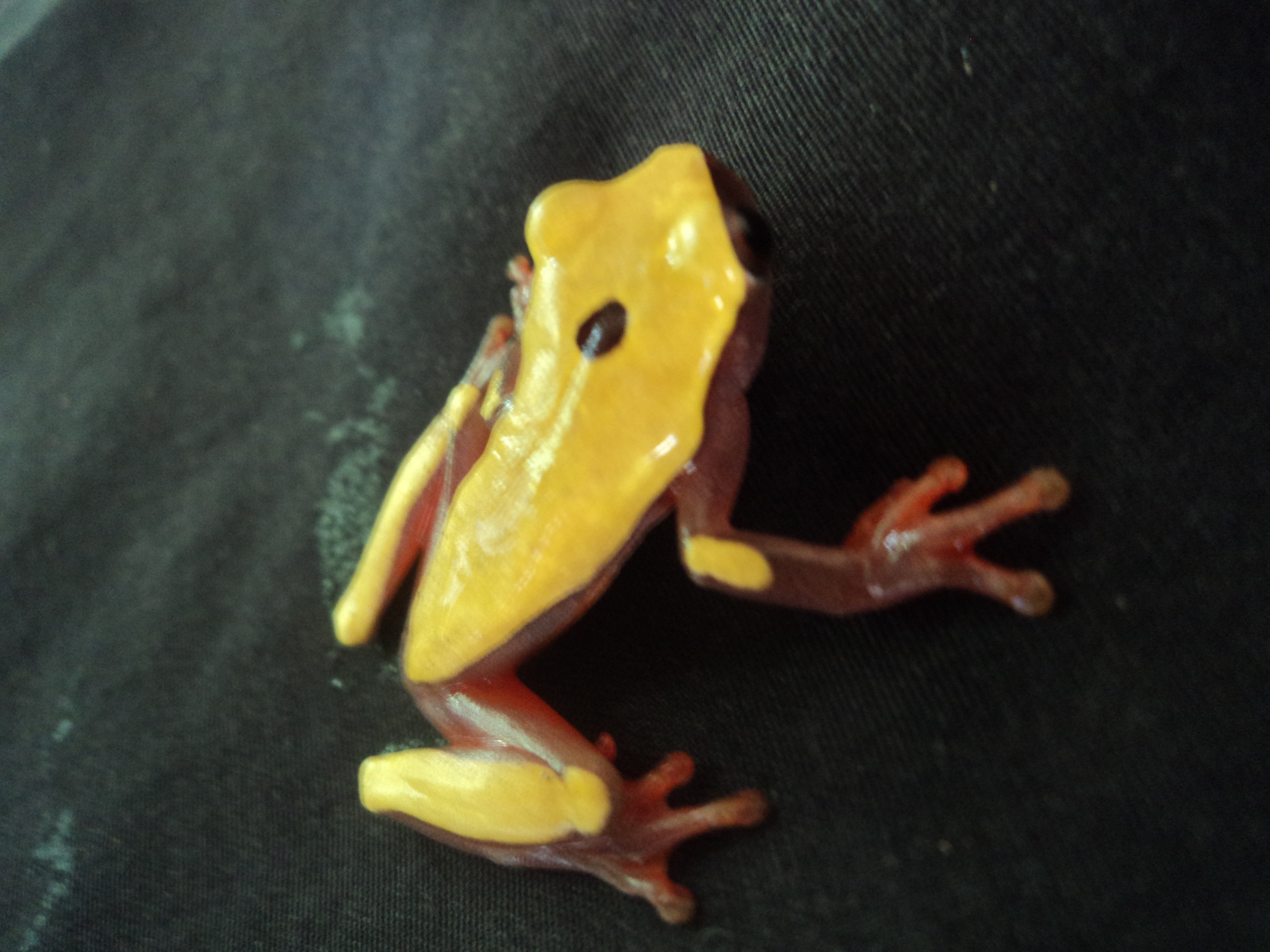

Conservation status
- Least Concern (IUCN 3.1)

Scientific classification
- Kingdom: Animalia
- Phylum: Chordata
- Class: Amphibia
- Order: Anura
- Family: Hylidae
- Genus: Dendropsophus
- Species: D. triangulum

Binomial name
- Dendropsophus triangulum (Günther, 1869)

Synonyms
- Hyla triangulum Günther, 1869; Hyla leucophyllata triangulum Cope, 1870; Hyla favosa Cope, 1885

= Dendropsophus triangulum =

Species of frog

Dendropsophus triangulum, commonly known as the triangle treefrog, is a species of frog in the family Hylidae. It is native to the Amazon Basin of Brazil, Ecuador, and Peru, but may also be present in Colombia.

== Distribution and habitat ==
Dendropsophus triangulum is known from Brazil (Acre, Amazonas, and Pará), Ecuador (Orellana and Sucumbíos), and Peru (Cusco and Loreto) at altitudes of 37–387 m (121–1,270 ft) above sea level. It can be found in primary and secondary tropical rainforests, around temporary ponds in clearings near forests, and in aquaculture ponds.

== Ecology ==
Dendropsophus triangulum reproduces in temporary water bodies, with tadpoles developing in water after hatching from eggs laid on leaves.
