= Diamond Peak Formation =

Geologic formation in Nevada, United States

- Stratigraphic range: Carboniferous
- Type: Formation
- Underlies: Ely Limestone

Lithology
- Primary: siltstone, limestone
- Other: sandstone, conglomerate

Location
- Region: Nevada
- Country: United States

The Diamond Peak Formation is a geologic formation in Nevada. It preserves fossils dating back to the Carboniferous period.

== See also ==
- List of fossiliferous stratigraphic units in Nevada
- Paleontology in Nevada
