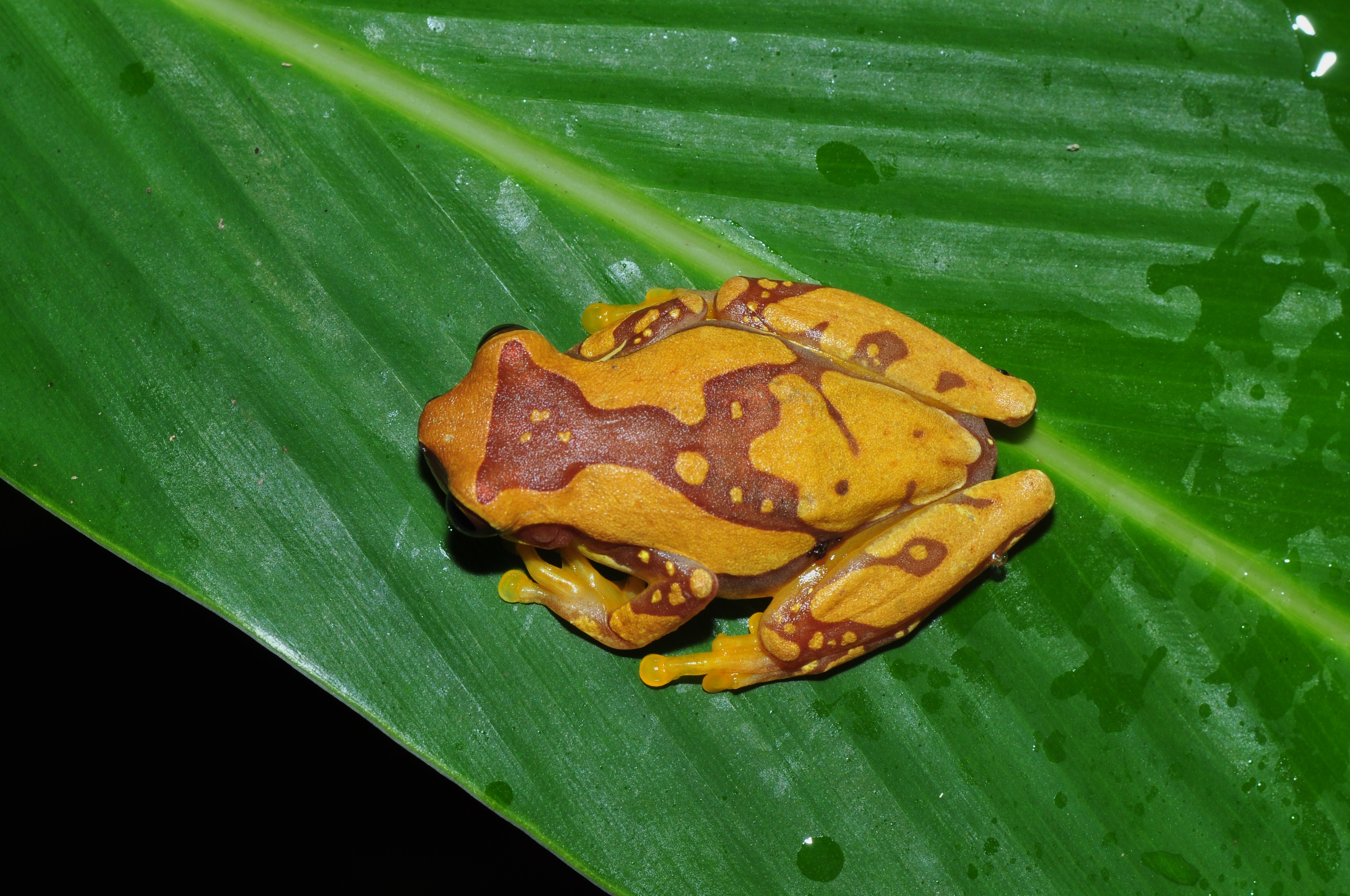
- with hourglass back

Conservation status
- Least Concern (IUCN 3.1)

Scientific classification
- Kingdom: Animalia
- Phylum: Chordata
- Class: Amphibia
- Order: Anura
- Family: Hylidae
- Genus: Dendropsophus
- Species: D. ebraccatus

Binomial name
- Dendropsophus ebraccatus (Cope, 1874)
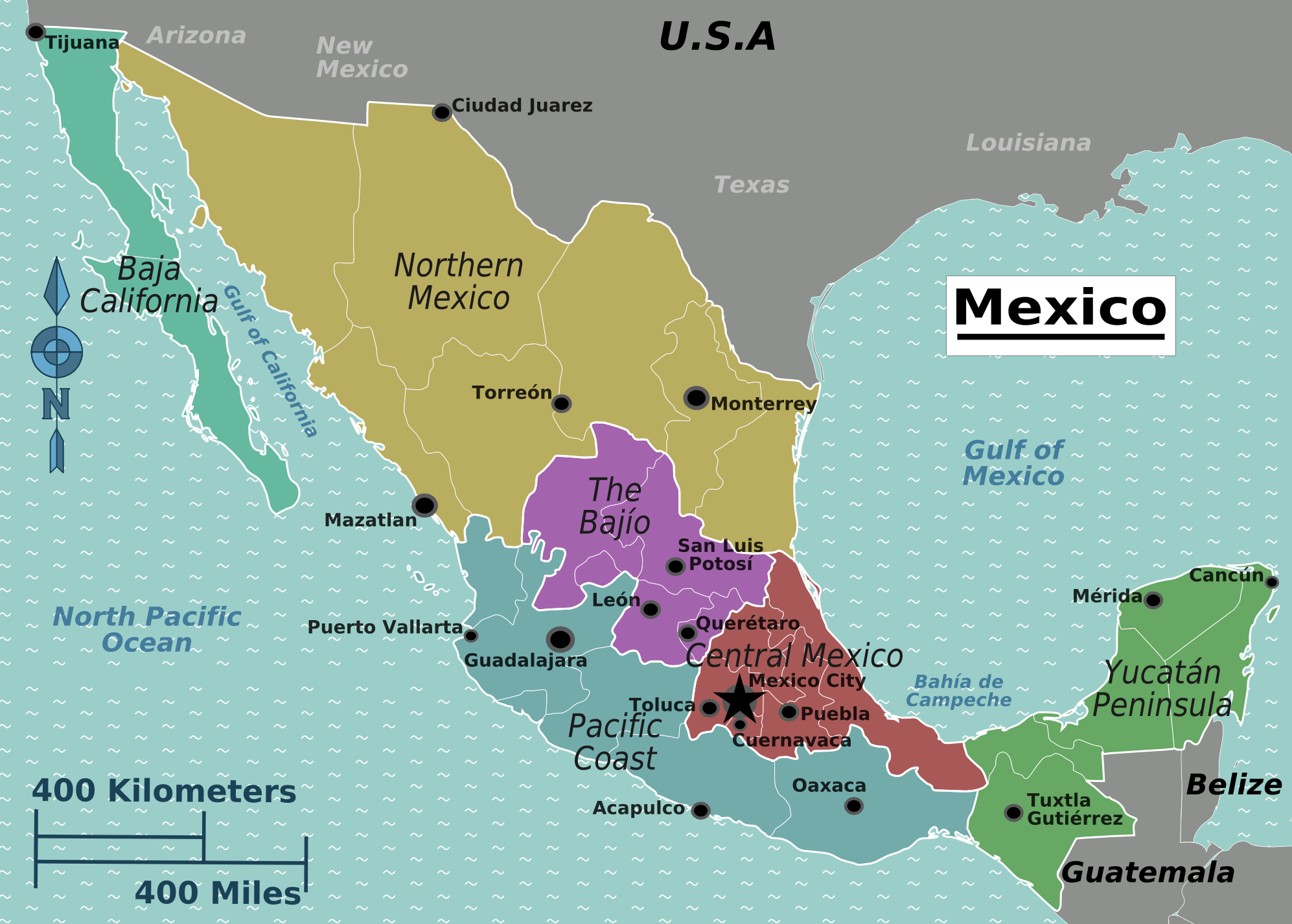
- Range in Mexico: central Mexico (red), southern Pacific coast (blue) & Yucatan Peninsula (green)
- Mexico and central america regions of D. ebraccatus range

Synonyms
- Hyla weyerae Taylor, 1954; Hyla ebraccata

= Dendropsophus ebraccatus =

Species of amphibian

Dendropsophus ebraccatus, also known as the hourglass treefrog, referring to the golden-brown hourglass shape seen surrounded by skin yellow on its back. Their underbellies are yellow. Their arms and lower legs usually display bold patterns while their upper legs or thighs are light yellow giving them the appearance of wearing no pants. The species name "ebraccata" translates to "without trousers" in Latin.

The hourglass treefrog is throughout Mexico from southern Veracruz and northern Oaxaca, slightly more southern in Chiapas, Tabasco, and the Yucatán Peninsula. The hourglass treefrog also presides south of Mexico in the northern Guatemala and Belize areas. The range of the hourglass treefrog becomes more scarce in Honduras and a few more known locations in Nicaragua, but then has been commonly reported again in Central America spanning from Costa Rica to Panama even venturing into Colombia and northwestern Ecuador.

== Taxonomy ==
Dendropsophus ebraccatus is a member of the wide-ranging tree frog family Hylidae and the genus Dendropsophus. Dendropsophus is a group of small, primarily yellow tree frogs found throughout Central and South America. A unique feature of the genus is that all individuals within the genus have 30 chromosomes. After a large revision to the family Hylidae in 2005, D. ebraccatus was moved from the Hyla genus to the Dendropsophus genus within the Hylidae family. The D. ebraccatus can be distinguished from similar species by identifying its the D. ebraccatus dominant dorsal pattern, the hourglass, since it can be confused with close relatives D. manonergra and D. triangulum.

== Description ==
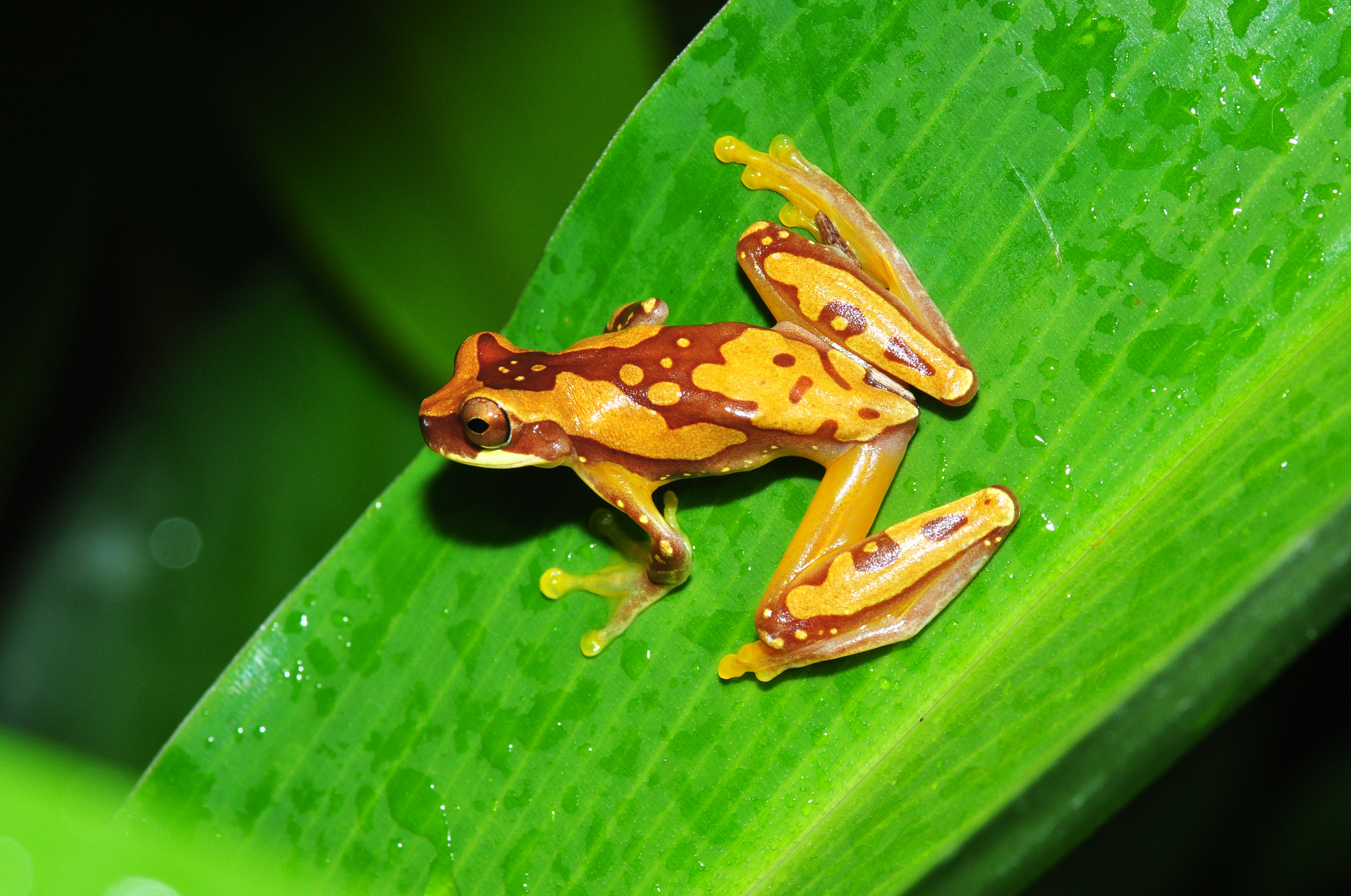
"pantsless" thighs and hourglass pattern

D. ebraccatus are smooth, small treefrogs exhibiting sexual dimorphism, with males being significantly smaller than females. Their dorsal coloration consists of blotches and spots that vary in its exact color from yellow, gold, or brown. These blotches can look like an hourglass while the rest of their skin provides a bright yellow background the darker patterned blotches. The dorsal color pattern of D. ebraccatus can be characterized as hourglass with spots, hourglass without spots, spots, and plain; however, the hourglass pattern is dominant in most populations. They are also called "pantless frogs" because when their hind legs are extended, their dark patterned blotches do not continue on their thighs and instead display pale-yellow skin on their thighs. This gives them the appearance of having no pants. The hourglass tree frog has relatively large forelimbs compared to the proportion of its body. It also has well developed toe discs for tree climbing. Their toe pads adhere via deformation of the soft epithelial cells. They also have long hind limbs for jumping from tree to tree. As compared to most Anura, most gas exchange occurs through their nostrils but actually release most carbon dioxide through their permeable skin.

== Distribution ==
The hourglass tree frog is native to Mexico in specific areas of Mexico: southern Veracruz, northern Oaxaca, Chiapas, Tabasco, and the Yucatán Peninsula. D. ebraccatus have been commonly seen throughout more southern countries including Guatemala, Belize, Costa Rica, and Panama. There are only a few known populations of D. ebraccatus in Nicaragua and Honduras. They are even seen more frequently throughout the northern Colombia and northwestern Ecuador.

== Reproduction ==
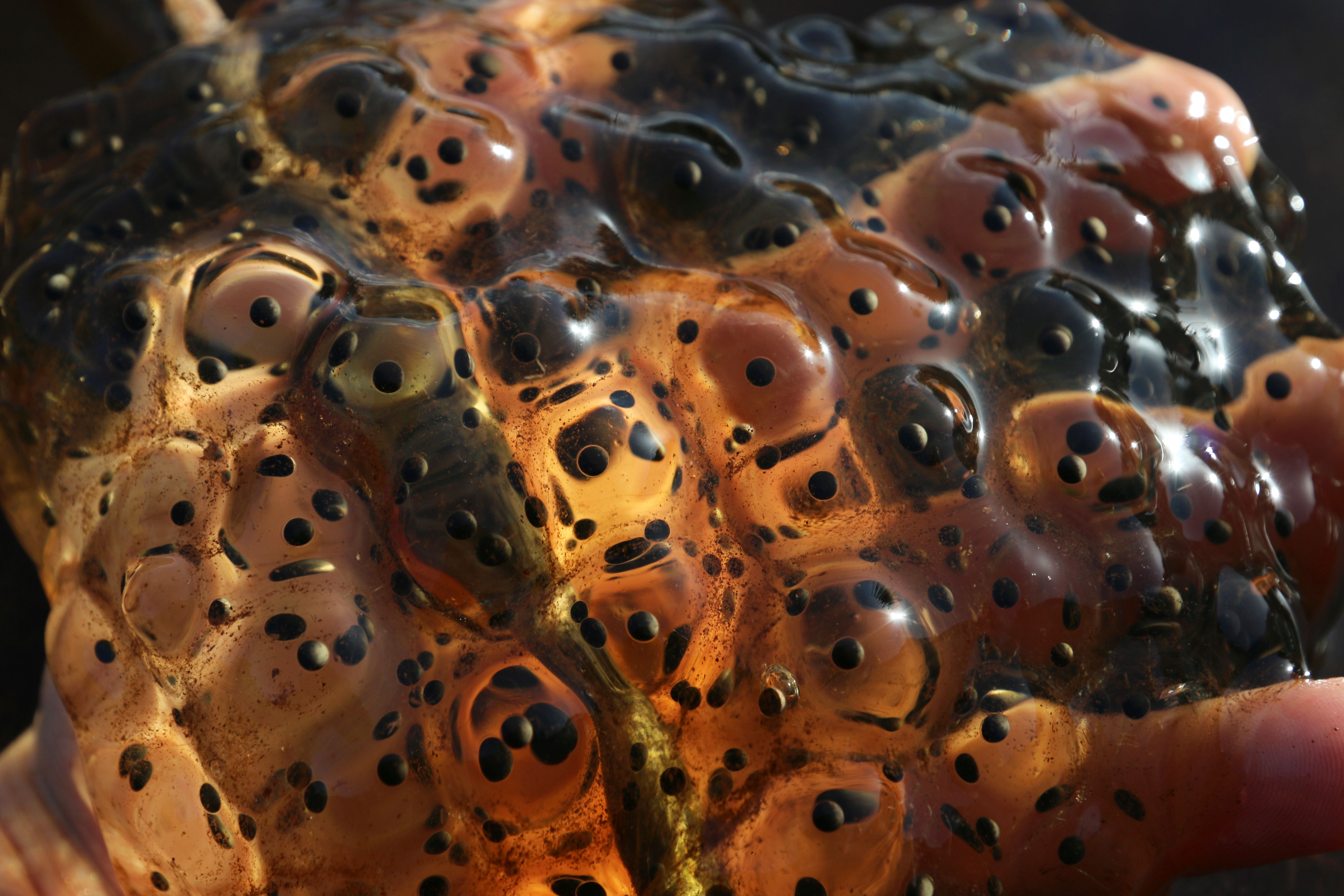
Frog egg clutch, eggs surrounded by jelly like substance

Hourglass tree frogs migrate to freshwater pools in vegetated areas to breed during the rainy seasons of Central and South America, between May and November. Once aggregated around freshwater pools, they utilize chorus as strategies to select mates. Males hide behind foliage around edges of marshes and ponds during the night and produce long mating calls to attract potential female mates. Once a male is selected by a female, he will climb onto her back and release his sperm into her cloaca.

Females reproduce multiple times within the breeding season, with gaps between reproductive spells as short as 10 days. Females will lay between 180 and 300 eggs, separated between up to eight different masses within a single night. Egg clutches are laid either in single layers on the upper surface of leaves overhanging freshwater or in clusters connected to floating vegetation within the water itself. Hourglass tree frogs are unique in their reproductive plasticity, allowing them to produce both aquatic and arboreal eggs. Arboreal eggs are deposited on the upper surfaces of leaves overhanging water, so the tadpoles can roll into the water once hatched, and aquatic eggs are attached to floating vegetation within the water to keep the eggs from sinking.

== Mating ==
=== Mate Searching Behavior ===
Research on anuran communication reveals that groups of male frog chorus to attract female frogs to mate. The relative success of these male frogs at attracting females depends on how their advertisement call is able to lead females to their calling space. As male density increases, a male's advertisement call is confused with the other calls. This confusion leads to females' inability to find which calling space the advertisement call originated from. The lowest intensity of a neighbor's call that a male frog is tolerant of is known as the aggressive threshold. When this threshold is reached, a male frog will use a different call known as an aggressive call to initiate male-male conflict or intolerance. Advertisement and aggressive calls both consist of an introductory note ending with a wide range of a number of clicks, and multiple notes and patterns.

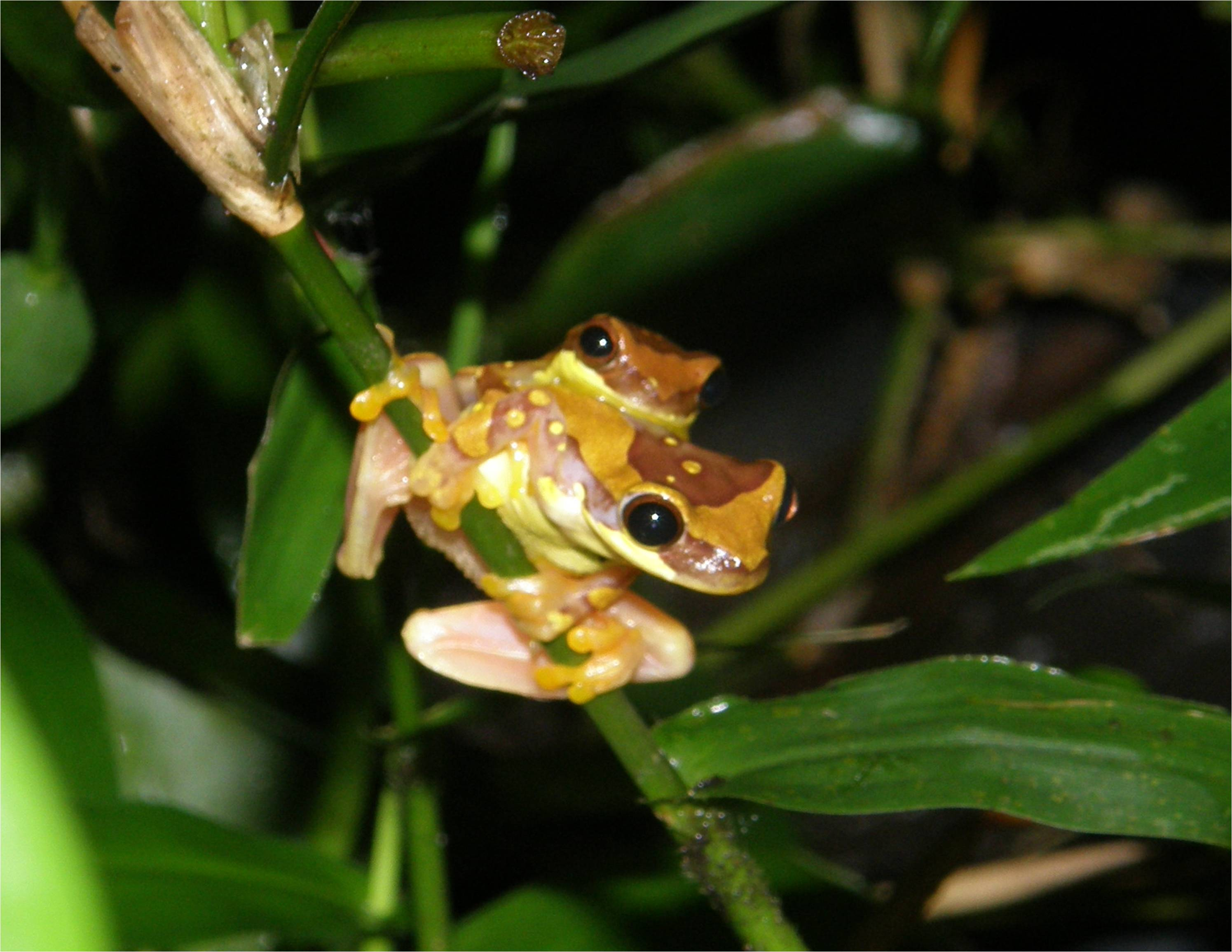
Hourglass treefrogs mating

Opposed to advertisement calls, aggression calls are characterized by a higher rate of repetition and longer timed calls.

=== Male/male Interactions ===
In opposition to most frog chorus species, D. ebraccatus chorus groups produce far-range aggressive calls more frequently than close-range. The higher proportion and number of far-range aggression calls causes D. ebraccatus males to be influenced by various surrounding calls in chorus groups instead of just calls from individual frogs. This influence from other males forces these male frogs to constantly adjust their calls accordingly. Generally, male frogs will respond to 2–4 Hz calls with synchronous advertisement calls. On the flip side, males will produce alternating advertisement calls or an initial delayed aggressive call when responding to a call that is 100 dB or more.

For aggressive calls, long calls are utilized for close interactions and physical altercations. During close interactions in which a male frog attacks another, they tussle with each other while still exchanging long duration calls. These physical alterations usually only last one minute unless they remain in close contact and will sometimes continue. On the other hand, short calls are utilized during far-range interactions.

=== Female/Male Interactions ===
==== Mate Choice ====
Call timing plays a significant role in female D. ebraccatus mating choice. Simultaneous male advertisement calling produces less reproductive success for males in close proximity. A male that starts its calls later is the preferred mating choice because females seem to prefer calls that end last. Click notes at the end of the late advertisement call may be one reason why females prefer the late call since the clicking of the lead call is blocked by the late call.

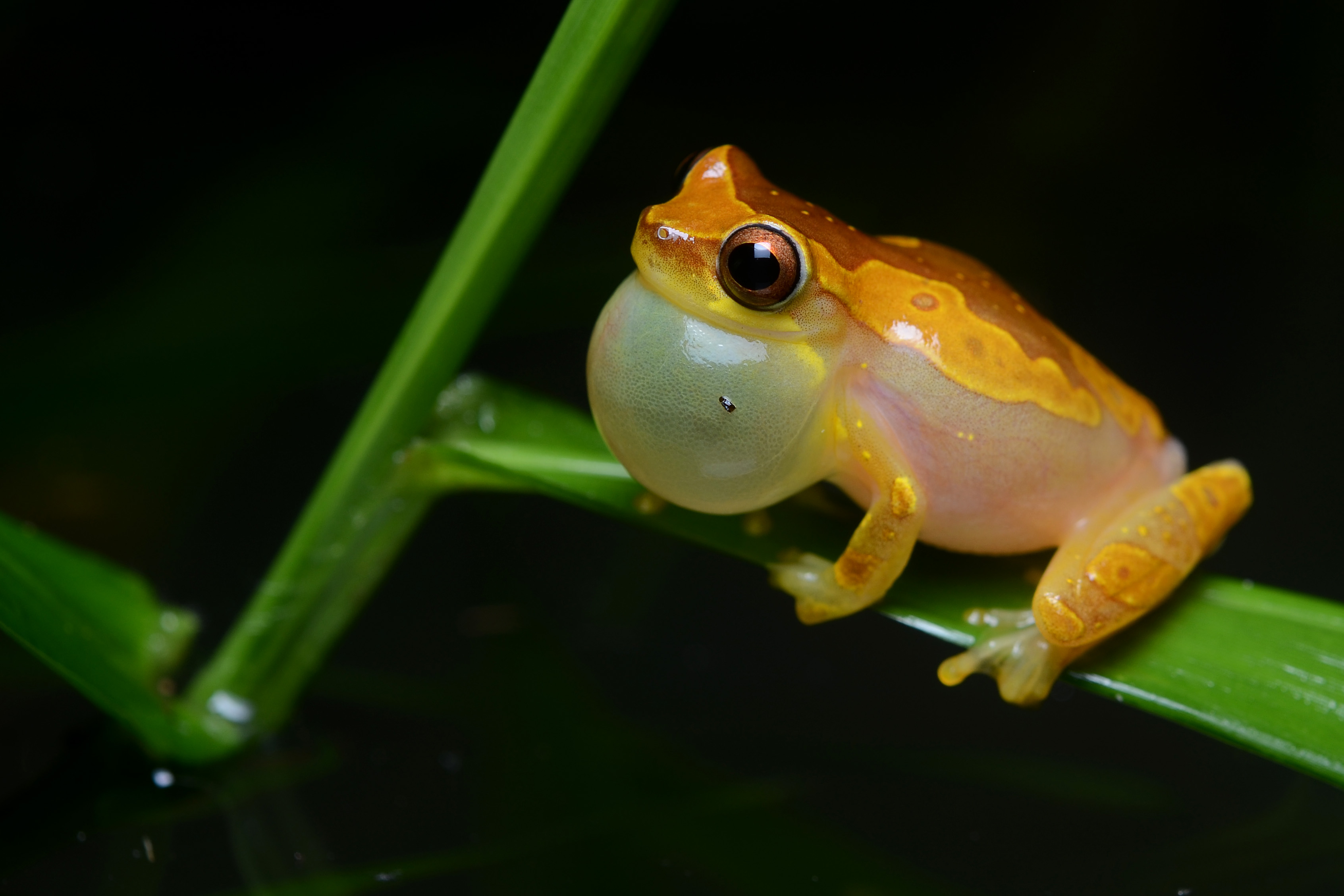
Male inflating vocal sac to make call

The timing of male calls only depends on the call they produce and not the ones they hear. D. ebraccatus males show more synchrony, or overlapping calls, when producing advertisement calls and prefer to alternate with other calls when they produce aggressive calls. Calls with 150 to 200 millisecond introductory note durations produced synchronous response calls the most efficiently. Although females generally prefer the late call, they are more attracted to the late call with the general timing of an advertising call being produced first and last. In cases where the lead male switches to aggressive calling (which is introduced in the courting section), the increased overlap between the lead aggressive call and the late advertisement call can cause females to not prefer the late advertisement call anymore.

Another aspect of male calls that influences mating choice is the number of notes. Many times, a responding advertisement call is synchronized to the first advertisement call as explained before but is also multi-noted. The advertisement calls are only 1-noted if in very dense choruses.

==== Courting ====
D. ebraccatus males produce calls in order to attract and court females leading to mating. There are two types of timed calls males produce: lead calls, which start first, and late or lagging calls, which start in the middle of the lead call. The timing of late calling males forces their male competitors to finish calling in the middle of their own advertisement call. This means the late caller finishes the call with its competitor calls being heard at the same time. In response to late male callers, the leading male callers adapted a strategy using aggressive calling. Since aggressive calling is longer than advertisement calling, the lead male switches to an aggressive call while the lagging male uses an advertisement call, which allows the lead male to finish last in more cases and increase their reproductive success. This strategy is an explanation for why D. ebraccatus have high levels of aggressive calls that would be costly for any other species of chorus frog mentioned in the male/male interactions subsection.

Despite this, the late call males cannot lengthen their time delay to decrease overlap and ensure that they finish last. The response time from one male call to another remains around 210 milliseconds no matter what call type they are producing or responding to besides the break increasing when male frogs switch to aggressive calling. There is also evidence that male frogs make many errors in aggressive call detection leading to decreased response time of a threat and decreased attraction by females since the call timing is off. Because females are more attracted to low aggression calls and advertisement calls, this could explain why male frogs are more likely to coordinate their levels of aggression to other calls. This is opposed to simply increasing the intensity of aggression in their call in response to other aggression calls.

The multi-noted synchronized call has two advantages: multiple notes can hide click notes in the leading call and synchronizing decreases the chance of the leader producing a call response. The decreased chance of a call response happens since many frogs will not answer if a call is produced less than 210 milliseconds after their first call has started. The only time a synchronous advertisement call is not multi-noted is in very dense choruses where advertisement calls are only 1-noted.

== Diet ==
While tadpoles are macrophagous herbivores, they may display cannibalistic behavior in the presence of dead tadpoles. Lepidoptera, Diptera larva, and Araneae are the most important aspects of the adult D. ebraccatus diet when this prey is abundant in the surrounding area. The prey of D. phlebodes and D. ebraccatus diet are the same and are only different in that the D. ebraccatus consumes larger prey.

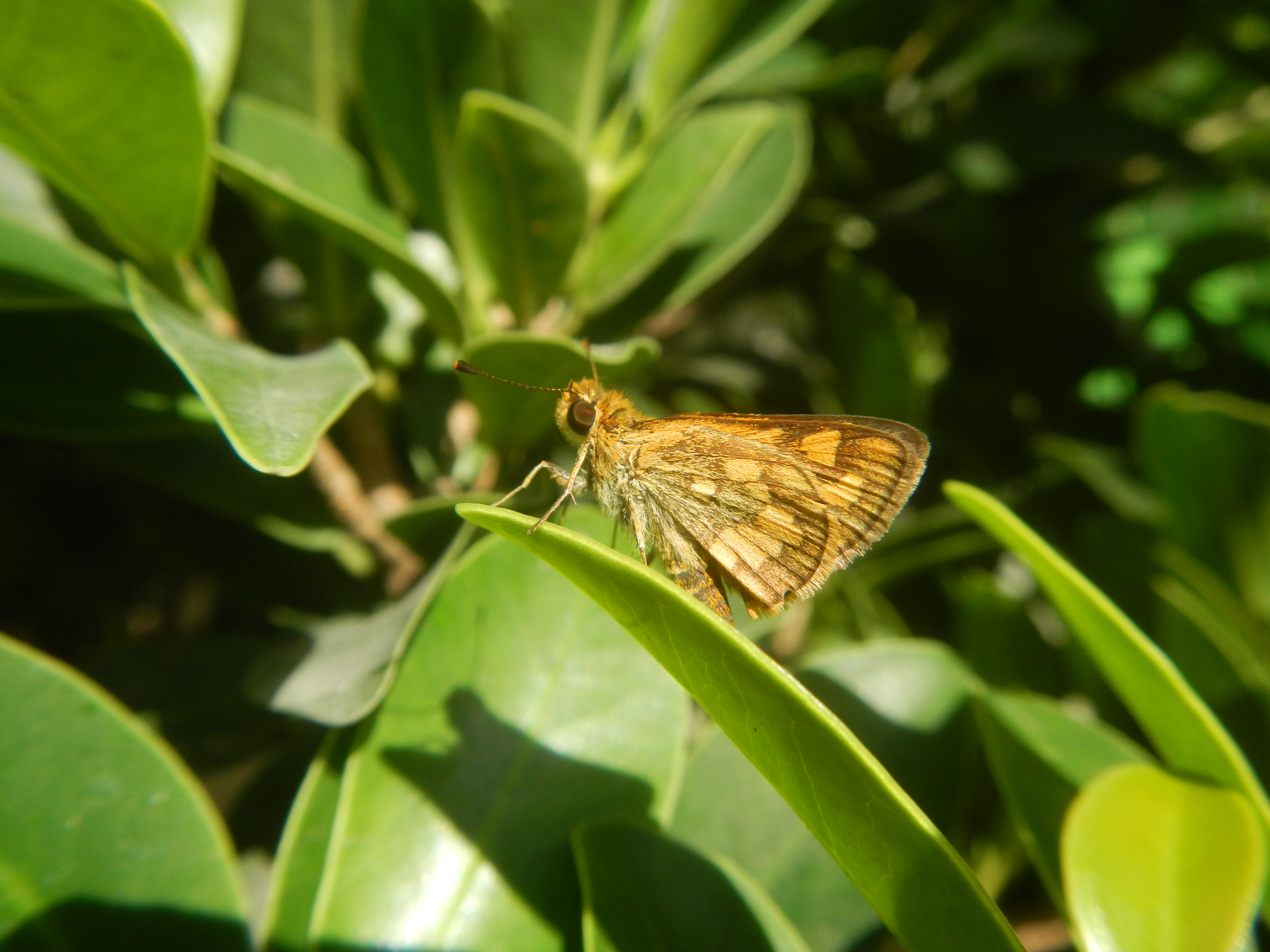
Lepidoptera (butterflies and moths)

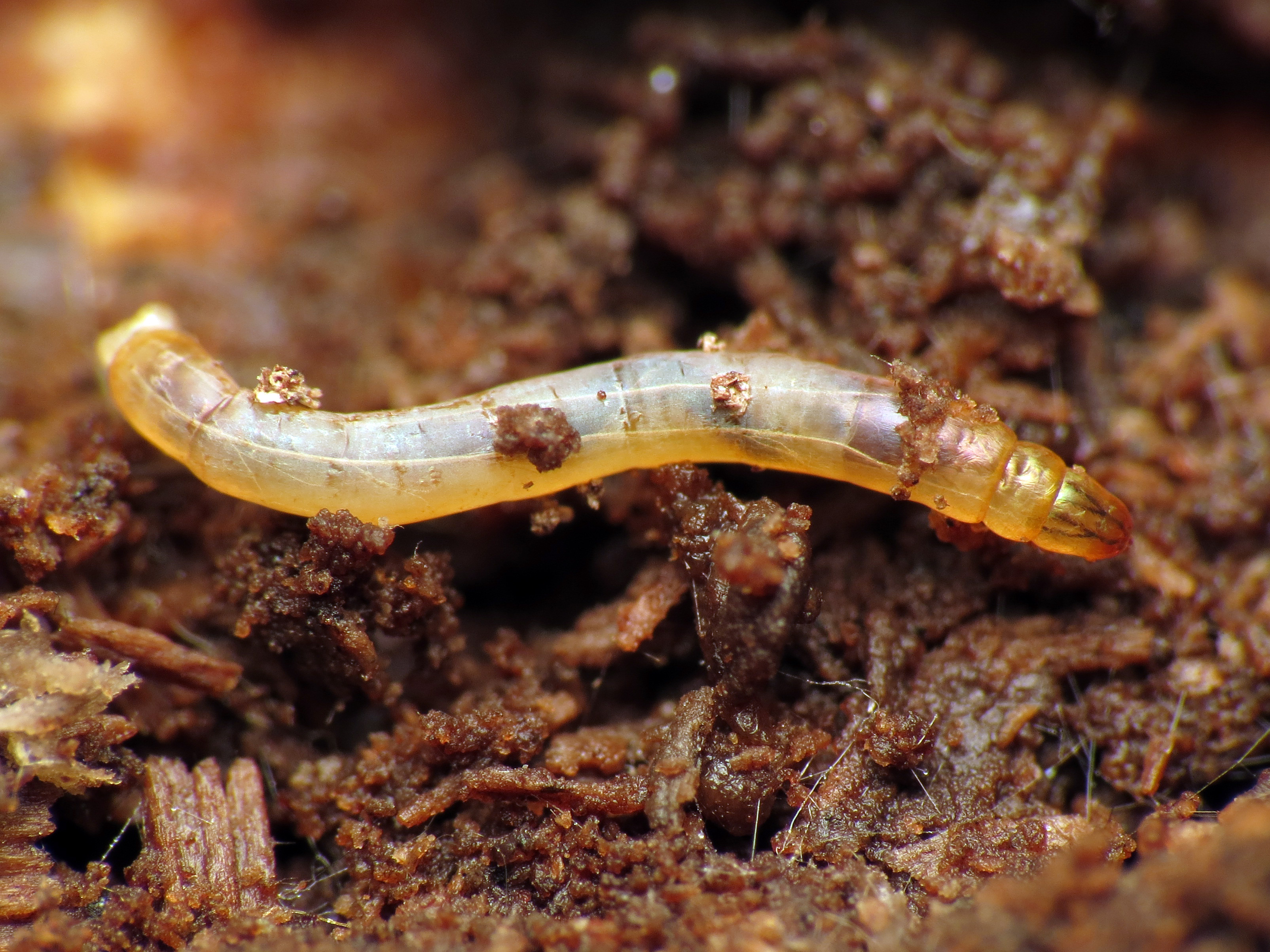
Diptera (fly) larva

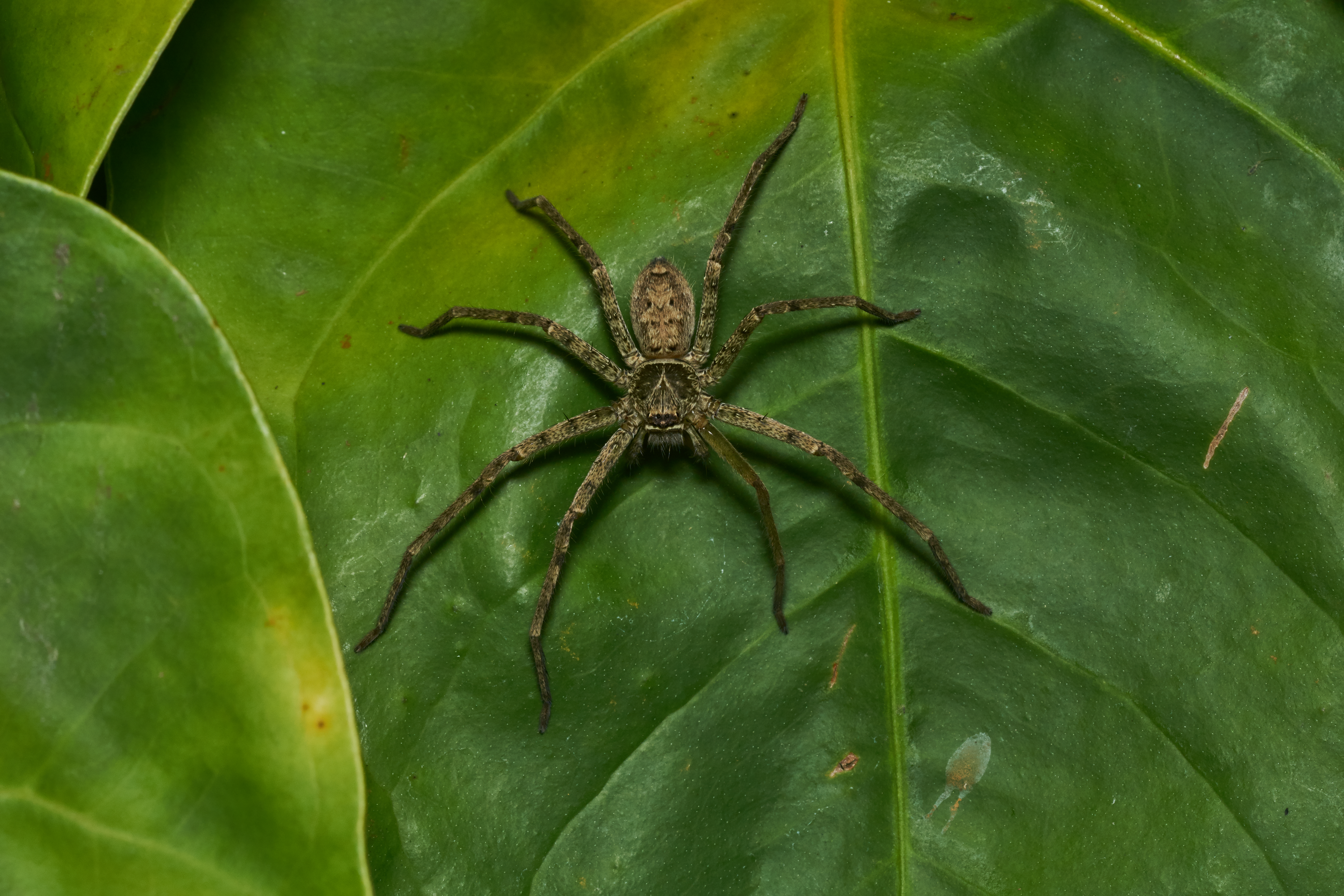
Araneae (spider)

== Parental Care ==
=== Oviposition ===
Undisturbed aquatic eggs develop at a slightly faster rate than arboreal eggs with an average hatch time of 3.5 days after placement. Both egg groups can alter their rate of development in the presence of unfavorable conditions such as weather or predation. Rates of development and hatching time can be altered from 67% faster to 600% slower than undisturbed hatch times. The rate of development is partially controlled by the rate of enzyme secretion by the hatching gland within the egg. The enzymes secreted by the hatching gland control the rate at which the eggs gel membrane is degradation.

D. ebraccatus are special in that they have a reproductive plasticity in where they can lay their eggs. Unlike any other vertebrate, these frogs can lay eggs in water and on land. Most vertebrae species have developed to lay eggs either on land or underwater, but the D. ebraccatus is thought to still be in the process of developing adaptations for success in air and water individually. The many choices of egg laying sites, on land, on leaves about water, on the water's surface, or fully submerged in water, are chosen based on risk of egg desiccation, the location of predators, and aquatic depth.

=== Site selection for egg laying ===
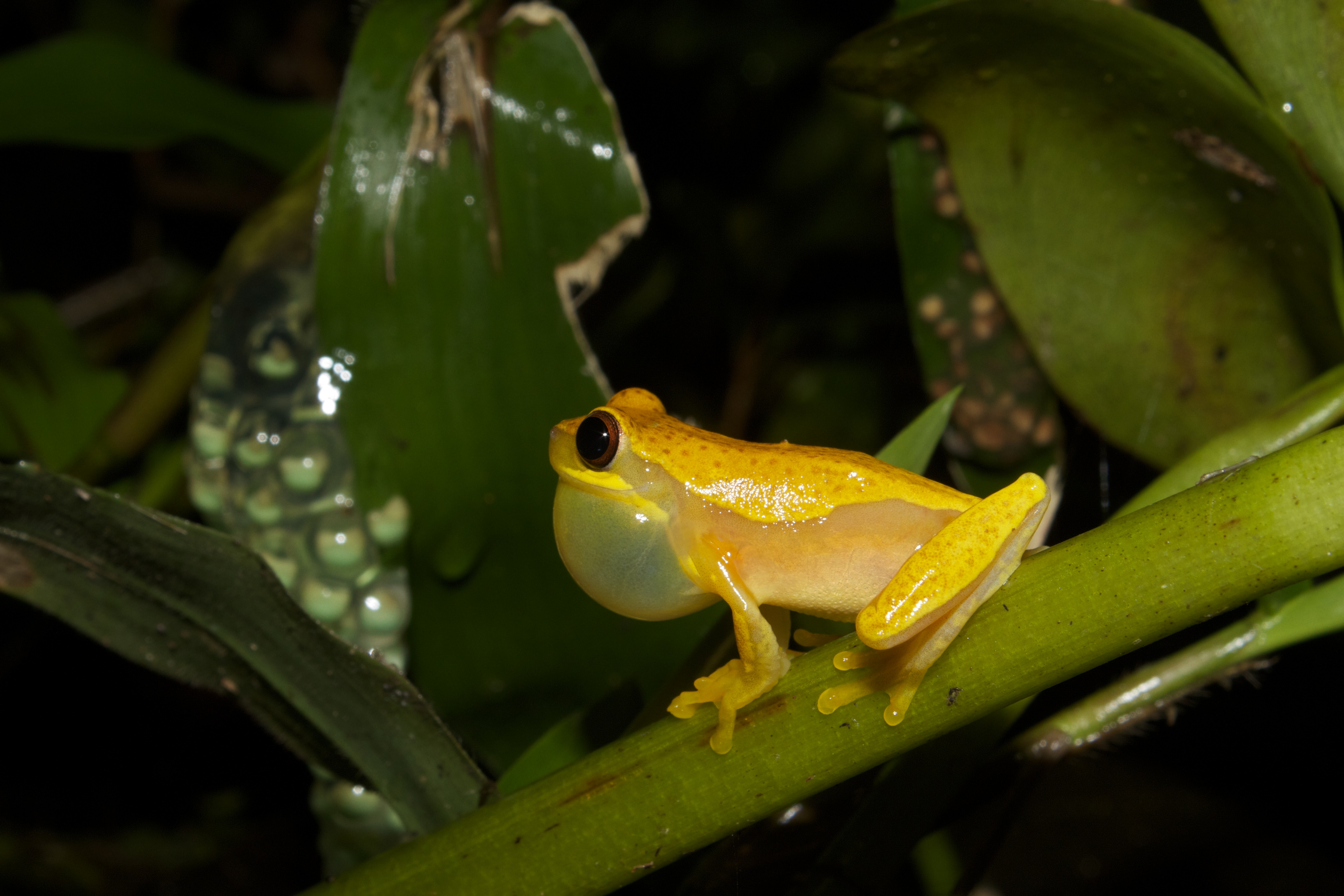
D. ebraccatus laid eggs on leaf

During drier seasons, D. ebraccatus eggs desiccate far faster than other terrestrial amphibian eggs when on land. On the other hand, D. ebraccatus embryos are more able to develop in aquatic environments unlike other terrestrial amphibian embryos that die before hatching. In habitats with limited shade, the D. ebraccatus females are more likely to lay their eggs under water. D. ebraccatus females will choose to lay their eggs on floating vegetation to hide their eggs from predators. When terrestrial vegetation floods, the eggs are now out in the open for predators they were previously hidden from to attack. When deciding whether to lay their eggs underwater during drier seasons, the D. ebraccatus females must take into account the deepness of the water. If the water is too deep, the eggs do not receive enough oxygen and die. The threat of aquatic predation has been shown to outweigh the risks of desiccation.

Both the quick terrestrial desiccation and ability for eggs to survive in aquatic environments before hatching are due to the smaller size of D. ebraccatus eggs. These eggs usually have a diameter of 1.2-1.4mm, which reduces the amount of oxygen they require and enhances their oxygen diffusion underwater. This reproductive plasticity in the D. ebraccatus is due to being in the intermediate stage of terrestrial reproductive evolution.

=== Tadpole Transport ===
Once eggs hatch, tadpoles either emerge in the water or roll off leaves into the pond below. Tadpoles are brown and gold with black eye bands and develop bright red tail colors in the presence of predators. Tadpoles feed on microfauna and scavenge what they can in the water until they mature after 6–8 weeks. Young frogs live near pools of water and only make their way back to the forest canopy when nearing adulthood.

== Social Behavior ==
=== Adult Sociality ===
Male aggressive calling not only is affected by mating and their need to defend their calling space but is also affected by social communication and environment with other aggressive males. In particular, the social environment surrounding a male responding to an intruder will affect the intensity of the responding aggressive calls produced. This idea of a social environment affecting aggressive call output started in this frog species with research examining the relationship between aggressive call intensity in response to an intruder versus their surrounding male competitors. With that being said, the effect of the social environment is much more complicated than that. Aggressive calls between males are not always from one individual to another. [8] In many cases, a call can be received by multiple frogs that must all compete to produce a responding call signal that is heard by the original frog. This finding means that D. ebraccatus males compete on many fronts during chorusing. They compete to find the best territory for producing calls that are heard over their competitors and for space where they themselves can receive calls. However, they can also compete to produce calls that are heard over others by adjusting their own call intensity in respect to surrounding aggressive calls. Males increase the aggressiveness of their calls when they have more competitors and when the aggressiveness of surrounding stimuli increases. Males decrease aggressive call intensity when there are a fewer number of competitors (or stimuli) and when surrounding calls have lower levels of aggressiveness.

=== Group Living ===
The common night call pattern of male chorus frog species is initially high aggressive call levels followed by a "stable chorus" with little to no aggressive calling. This pattern is due to habituation, the increase of aggressive thresholds in response to repeated calls greater than their original threshold. In contrast with most frog chorus species, a large fraction of D. ebraccatus males still make aggressive calls throughout the night with only a slight decrease. The continued aggressive calls throughout the night in this species indicates that D. ebraccatus males do not habituate in response to aggressive calls and instead are sensitized. In other words, these frogs initially decrease their aggressive threshold after exposure to repeated calls above threshold. This mechanism leads to more frequent aggressive calls than other chorus frogs. Anuran species that display chorus behaviors use aggressive calls as a mechanism to defend territory from other males, so it was not known for a while why high calling rates that expose male hourglass tree frogs to dangerous situations is maintained.

One possible reason for high aggressive calling levels is that D. ebraccatus aggressive and advertisement thresholds are initially equal, and they need to decrease their aggressive threshold in order to be able to distinguish and respond to these distinct call types. Generally, there is a 210 millisecond response time frame that males take to respond to one call with a call of their own. The only exception to this 210 millisecond time frame is when male frogs are making the decision to switch to aggressive calls. The male frogs seem to respond with their first aggressive call more slowly due to trying to distinguish an advertisement call from an aggressive call. Another reason for the higher aggressive calls in comparison with other chorus frogs is due to lead males adopting an aggressive call as a strategy to increase its attractiveness to females. This strategy is explained more in the mate choice subsection.

Another anomaly seen with D. ebraccatus males compared to other species is that their aggressive calls more often than not have intended recipients spanning far distances. These frequent far range aggressive calls in large chorus groups cause D. ebraccatus males to be influenced by various surrounding calls more often than calls from individual frogs. This influence from other males versus producing calls that attract females forces these male frogs to constantly adjust their calls accordingly.

== Protective Coloration ==
Tadpoles that grow the predator-induced phenotype of having the largest, deep, and reddest tail fins also have the developmental cost of growing to be the smallest in overall size. This can be seen when D. ebraccatus tadpoles develop in the presence of the Pantala flavescens, or the dragonfly nymph. The Dragonfly nymph are smaller fish, can swim through tighter areas to catch their prey, and usually hunt alone. The tadpoles are induced to grow in a way where they can escape an initial attack and usually survive after. Tadpoles develop an opposite phenotype when they encounter a specific type of predator, the Astyanax ruberrimus. When D. ebraccatus tadpoles develop in the presence of these fish, they grow shallow achromatic tails. This is because the Astyanax ruberrimus is a fast fish that can eat prey larger than itself by repeatedly attacking it and then swallowing it whole. This fish also usually hunts in groups and individual tadpoles can be attacked multiple times in a row by many of these fish. They grow smaller instead of bigger as an attempt to avoid these attacks more efficiently.

== Conservation ==
The IUCN Red List of Threatened Species listed the Hourglass Tree Frog as a species of least concern (LC) in 2010 due to wide distribution, stable, large population, and high tolerance to adapt to habitat modifications. This species population is in many protected areas throughout the range. Although it is very adaptable it still faces many threats such as deforestation, agriculture and aquaculture (livestock farming and ranching, annual and perennial non-timber crops), logging, residential and commercial development, the pet industry, and pollution.

== Research ==
The skin of the family Hylidae is vastly studied due to its rich sources of bioactive peptides, which has spiked the interest for drug development. Those in the family Hylidae use the peptides in defense against bacteria, fungi, protozoans, viruses, and desiccation. These peptides are of interest to scientists due to their anti-infective and therapeutic potential. Peptides have been found to stimulate insulin release for Type 2 diabetes mellitus therapy. They are also used for their ability to be the precursor for encoding cDNAs. Pathogenic bacteria and fungi antibiotic resistance constitutes a serious threat to public health worldwide, scientists are looking to frogs skin secretions for further drug advancements.
