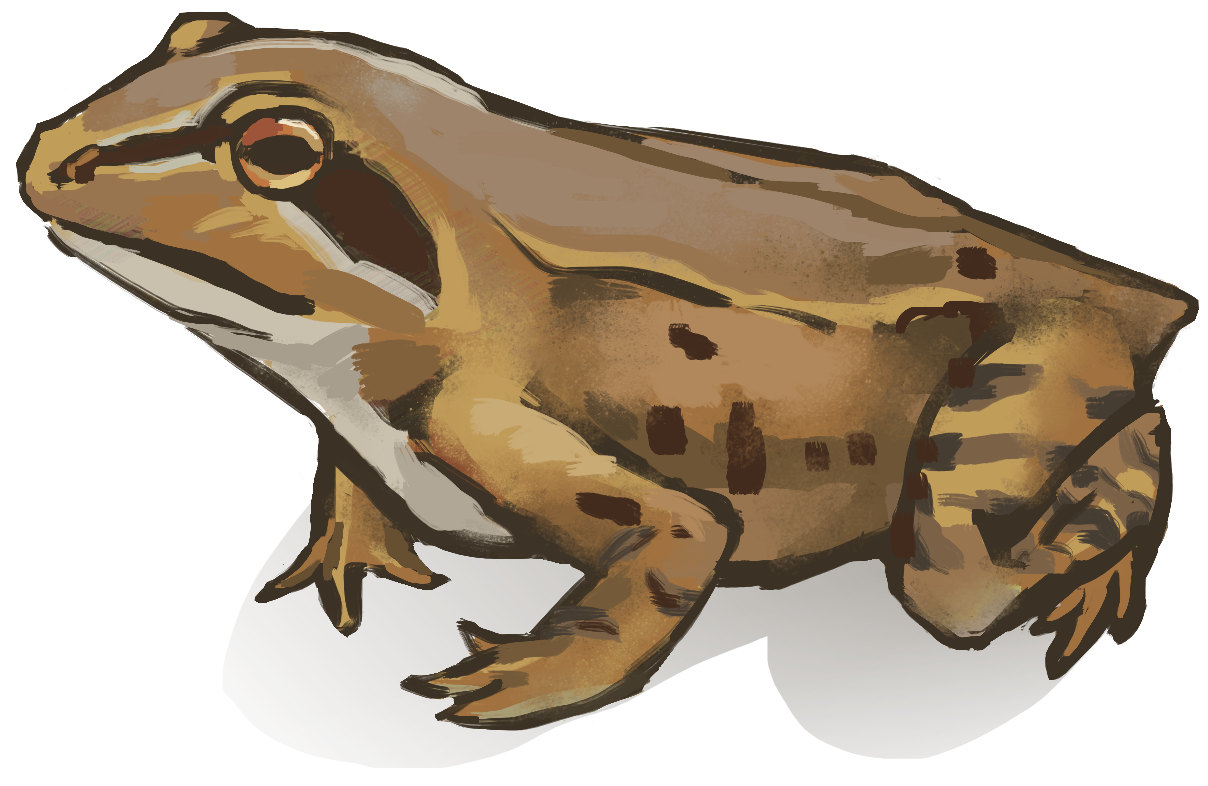

Scientific classification
- Kingdom: Animalia
- Phylum: Chordata
- Class: Amphibia
- Clade: Salientia
- Genus: †Czatkobatrachus; Evans & Borsuk−Białynicka, 1998
- Species: †C. polonicus

Binomial name
- †Czatkobatrachus polonicus Evans & Borsuk−Białynicka, 1998

= Czatkobatrachus =

Czatkobatrachus Temporal range: Early Triassic (Olenekian) ~251.3–247.2 Ma

Extinct genus of frogs

Czatkobatrachus is an extinct genus of Early Triassic (Olenekian) salientian amphibians. It was first described in 1998 based on fossils found in the Czatkowice 1 quarry in Poland. It is, with Triadobatrachus, one of the two oldest known lissamphibians. More precisely, it is a member of Salientia; it is related to, but outside Anura, the taxon that includes all extant frogs. It is known only from the early Triassic of Poland. Its vertebral column may have been short as in other salientians, but the exact count is unknown. It had a short tail, and an elongated ilium. Although based on isolated and disarticulated material the surface preservation is exquisite.

== See also ==
- List of prehistoric amphibian genera
