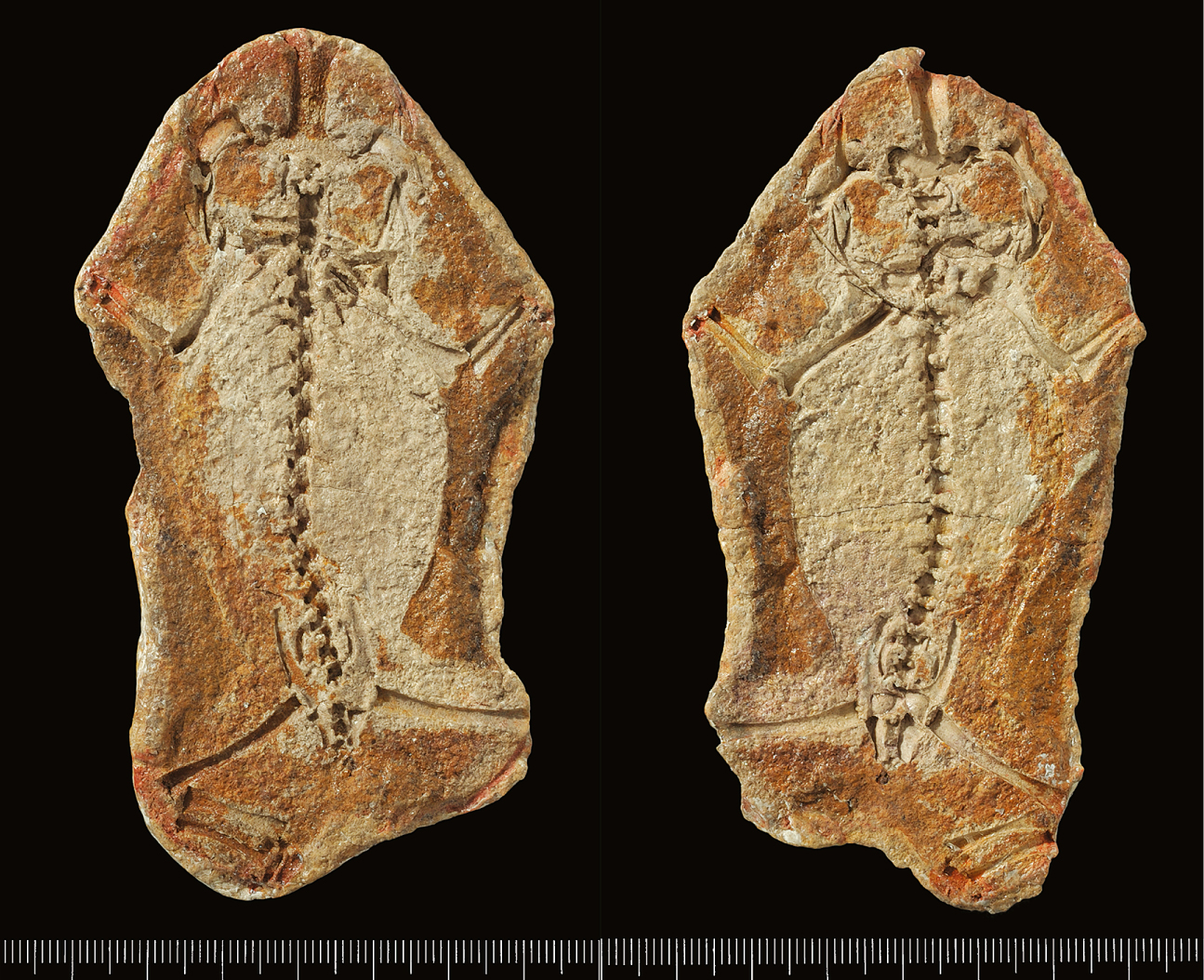
- Slabs of the fossil

Scientific classification
- Kingdom: Animalia
- Phylum: Chordata
- Class: Amphibia
- Genus: †Triadobatrachus; Kuhn, 1962
- Species: †T. massinoti

Binomial name
- †Triadobatrachus massinoti (Piveteau, 1936)

= Triadobatrachus =

Triadobatrachus Temporal range: Early Triassic, 250 Ma

Extinct genus of amphibians

Triadobatrachus is an extinct genus of salientian frog-like amphibians, including only one known species, Triadobatrachus massinoti. It is the oldest member of the frog lineage known, and an excellent example of a transitional fossil. It lived during the Early Triassic about 250 million years ago, in what is now Madagascar.

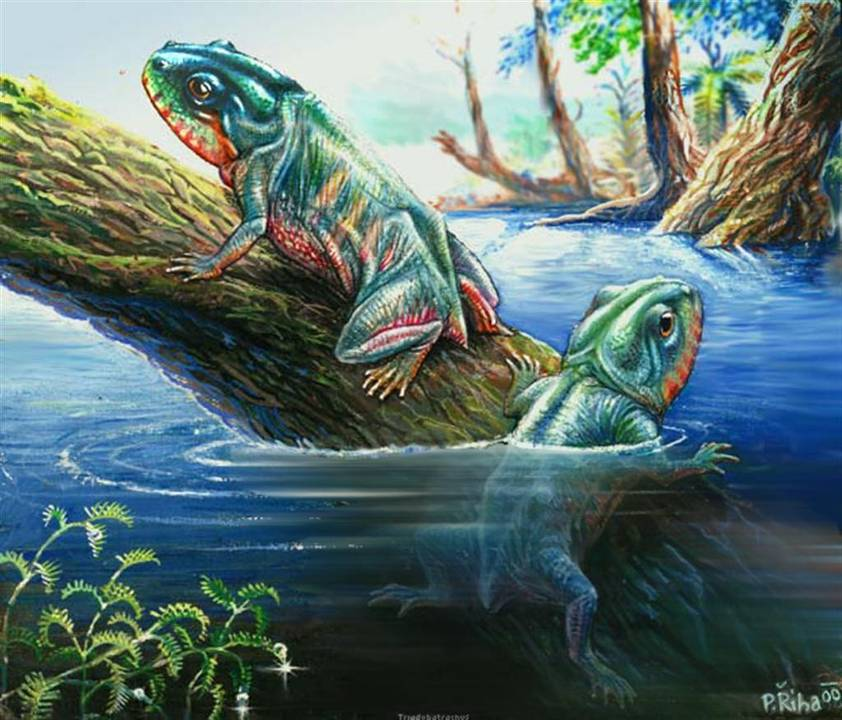
Life restoration by Pavel Říha

Triadobatrachus was 10 cm (3.9 in) long, and still retained many primitive characteristics, such as possessing at least 26 vertebrae, where modern frogs have only four to nine. At least 10 of these vertebrae formed a short tail, which the animal may have retained as an adult. It probably swam by kicking its hind legs, although it could not jump, as most modern frogs can. Its skull resembled that of modern frogs, consisting of a latticework of thin bones separated by large openings.

This creature, or a relative, evolved eventually into modern frogs, the earliest example of which is Prosalirus, millions of years later in the Early Jurassic.

It was first discovered in the 1930s, when Adrien Massinot, near the village of Betsiaka in northern Madagascar, found an almost complete skeleton in the Induan Middle Sakamena Formation of the Sakamena Group. The animal must have fossilized soon after its death, because all bones lay in their natural anatomical position. Only the anterior part of the skull and the ends of the limbs were missing. This fossil was initially described under the name Protobatrachus massinoti by the French paleontologist Jean Piveteau in 1936. (While this name is treated as being occupied, a 2025 paper pointed out that its oldest usage referred to the sperm cells of an indeterminate extant frog, thereby making it invalid and giving its use for “Triadobatrachus” priority) Much more detailed description were published more recently.

Although it was found in marine deposits, the general structure of Triadobatrachus shows that it probably lived for part of the time on land and breathed air. Its proximity to the mainland is further borne out by the remains of terrestrial plants found with it, and because most extant amphibians do not tolerate saltwater, and that this saltwater intolerance was probably present in the earliest lissamphibians.

Triadobatrachus is similar in age to the salientian Czatkobatrachus which is known from the Early Triassic (Olenekian) of Czatkowice Poland.

== Gallery ==
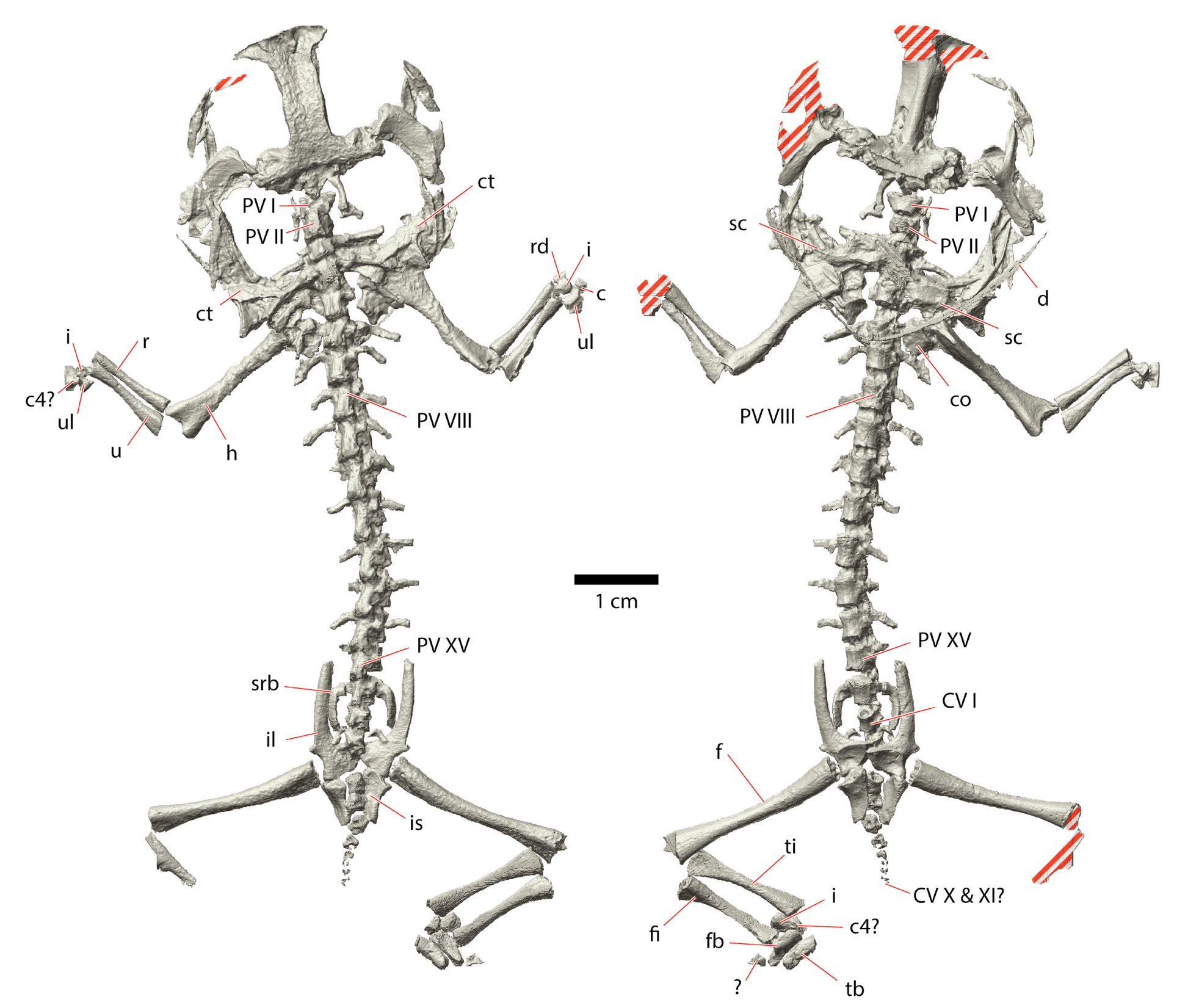
CT-scan

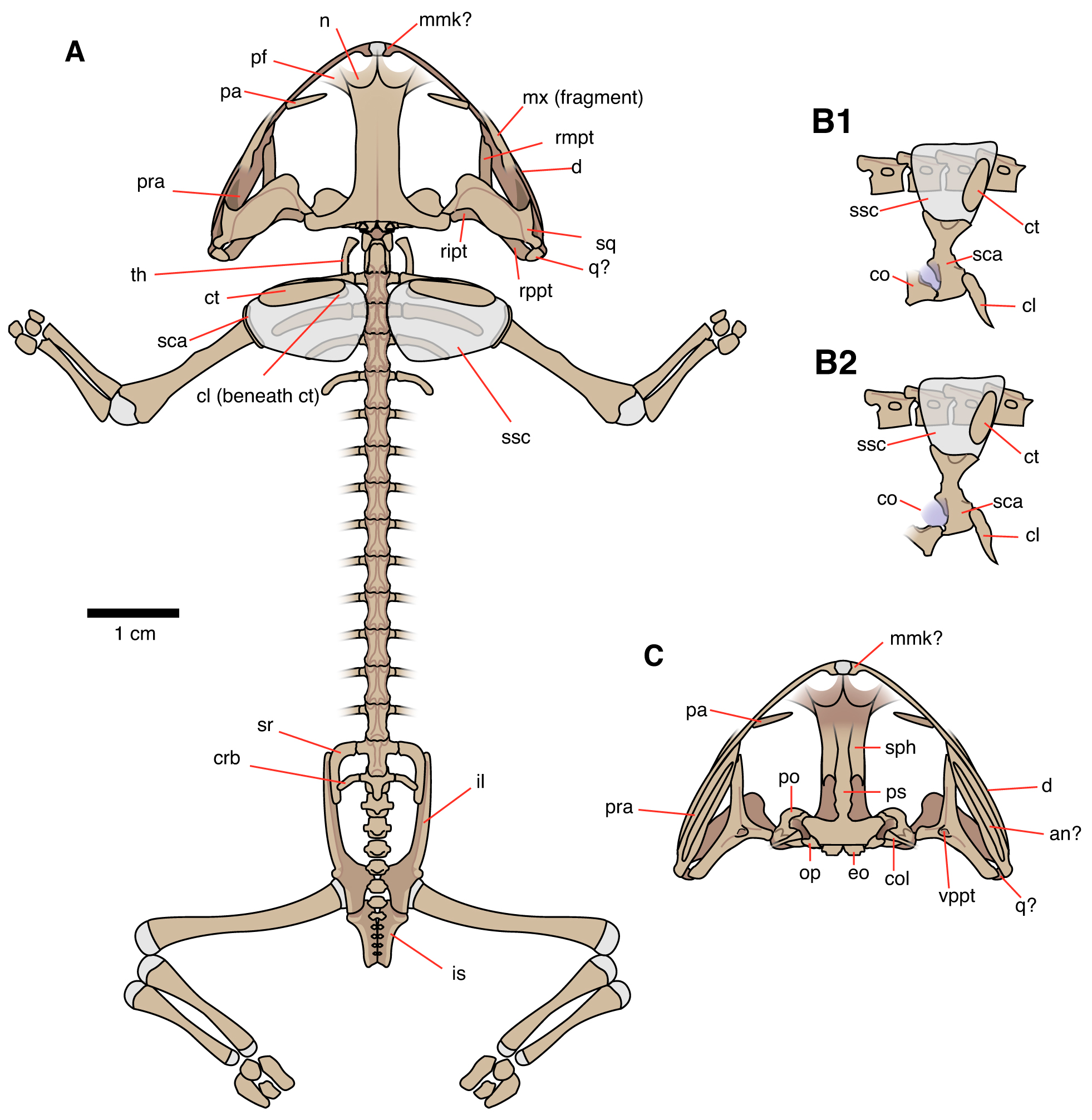
Diagram

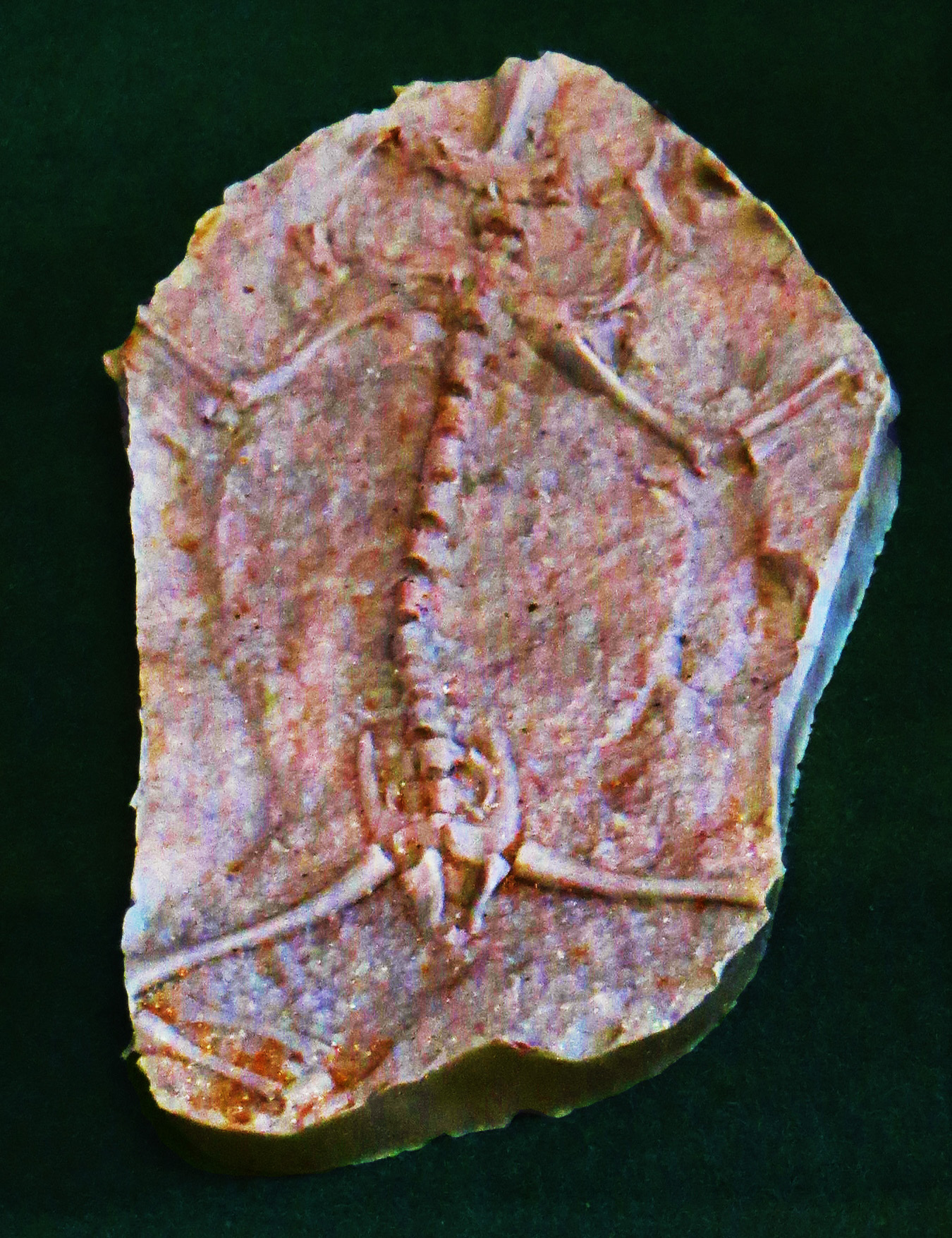
Cast

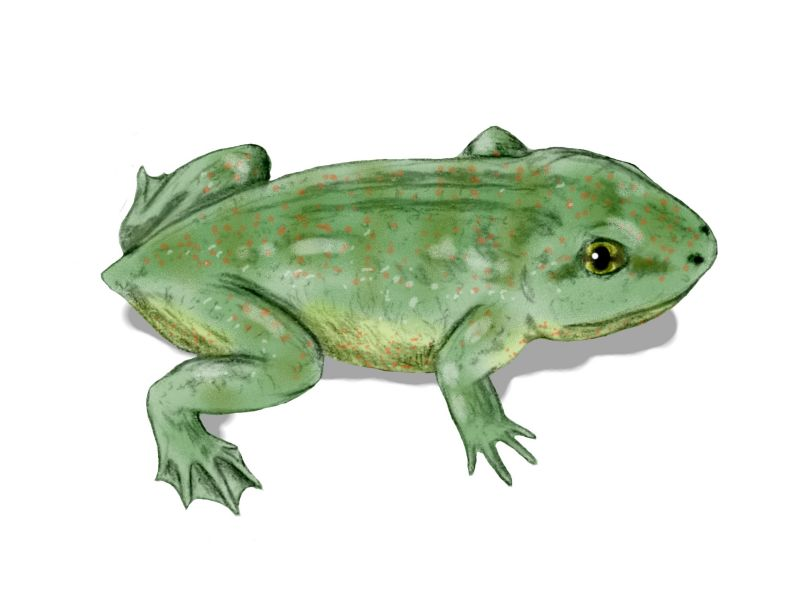
Life restoration by N. Tamura
