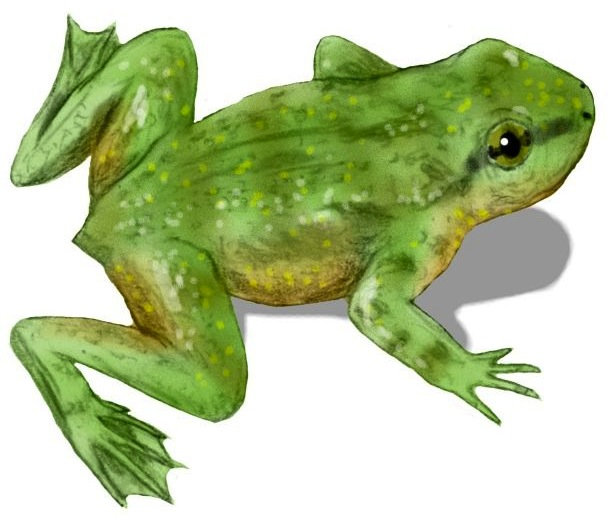
- Prosalirus bitis

Scientific classification
- Domain: Eukaryota
- Kingdom: Animalia
- Phylum: Chordata
- Class: Amphibia
- Order: Anura
- Family: †Prosaliridae
- Genus: †Prosalirus; Shubin & Jenkins, 1995

Type species
- Prosalirus bitis Shubin & Jenkins, 1995

= Prosalirus =

Prosalirus Temporal range: Early Jurassic {Sinemurian–Toarcian), 195.2–182.7 Ma

Extinct genus of amphibians

Prosalirus is an extinct genus of primitive frog known from the Early Jurassic of North America. It contains a single species, P. bitis, known from the Kayenta Formation of Arizona.

== Description ==
The fossils of P. bitis were discovered in 1981 by Farish Jenkins, who noted their distinctive hind legs for jumping. Only three skeletons were discovered. Jenkins would describe the species in 1995 alongside Neil Shubin. The genus name derives from prosalire, Latin for "leap forward", while bitis derives from the Navajo word for "high above it".

The skeleton has primitive features, but has mostly lost the salamander-like traits of its ancestors. It has a skeleton designed to absorb the force of jumping with its hind legs and tail. It also has long hip bones, long hind leg bones, and long ankle bones, all similar to modern frogs, and is as of 2009 the earliest true frog. It is thought to have lived during the Early Jurassic epoch 190 million years ago, well before the first known modern frog, Callobatrachus.

== Habitat ==
The Prosalirus is believed to have lived in brackish, freshwater, and terrestrial environments.
