= Hassell model =

Framework in population ecology

The Hassell model (or Hassell equation) is a classic discrete-time population model which gives the estimates for a single species the number of individuals in the population in a given discrete time step as a function of the number of individuals in the preceding time step. It is a generalization of the Beverton-Holt model and historically descends from the Ricker model.

$$N_{t+1} = \frac{R_0 N_t}{(1+aN_t)^b}.$$

The equation was written by Michael Hassell in 1975. Here $R_0$ is to be understood as the competition-free growth rate, $b$ as a value that parameterizes the kind of competition ranging from scramble competition to contest competition, and while $a$ lacks a clear and distinct biological meaning, simple algebra reveals that if $b=1$, then $a=1/K$, where $K$ denotes the long-run carrying capacity.
