= Academy of Natural Sciences of Drexel University =

Research institution and museum in Philadelphia, US

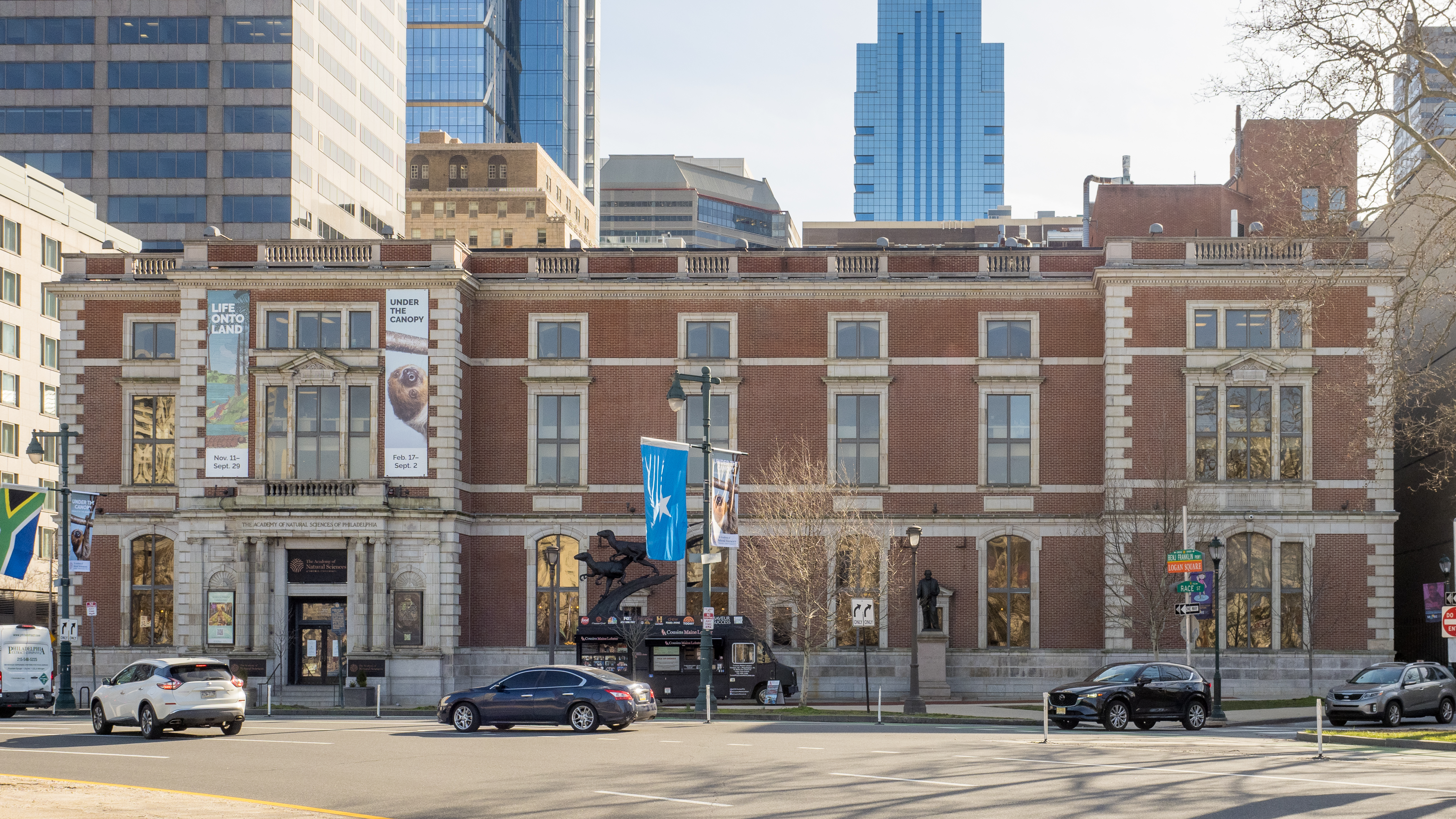
- The Academy of Natural Sciences of Drexel University in March 2024

- Location within Philadelphia
- Established: 1812; 214 years ago
- Location: 1900 Benjamin Franklin Parkway; Philadelphia, Pennsylvania, U.S.
- Coordinates: 39°57′25″N 75°10′17″W
- Type: Natural history museum
- Collection size: 19 million specimens
- Presidents: Scott Cooper, PhD
- Public transit access: SEPTA bus: 32, 33, Suburban Station
- Website: www.ansp.org

Pennsylvania Historical Marker
- Official name: Academy of Natural Sciences
- Type: City
- Designated: May 15, 2013
- Location: 302 Market St., Philadelphia, Pennsylvania, U.S.
- Marker Text: Founded nearby in 1812, it is the oldest natural science institution in the Americas and a leading resource for the study of life on Earth, with outstanding exhibits and scientific collections. It relocated to Logan Square in 1876, and was part of Drexel University since 2011.
- Closed to the public: September 30, 2026

The Academy of Natural Sciences of Drexel University is the oldest natural science research institution in the Americas. Formerly the Academy of Natural Sciences of Philadelphia, it was founded in 1812, by many of the leading naturalists of the young American republic with an expressed mission of "the encouragement and cultivation of the sciences".

Located in Philadelphia, Pennsylvania, United States, it has sponsored expeditions, conducted original environmental and systematics research, and amassed natural history collections containing more than 17 million specimens. As a museum the Academy also organized public exhibits and educational programs for both schools and the general public.

On September 1, 2026, Drexel University announced that the museum would close its doors on September 30, with the museum's last day open to the public with regular hours being the 27th. This precipitated a swift backlash, with many groups campaigning for the museum to be kept open.

== History ==
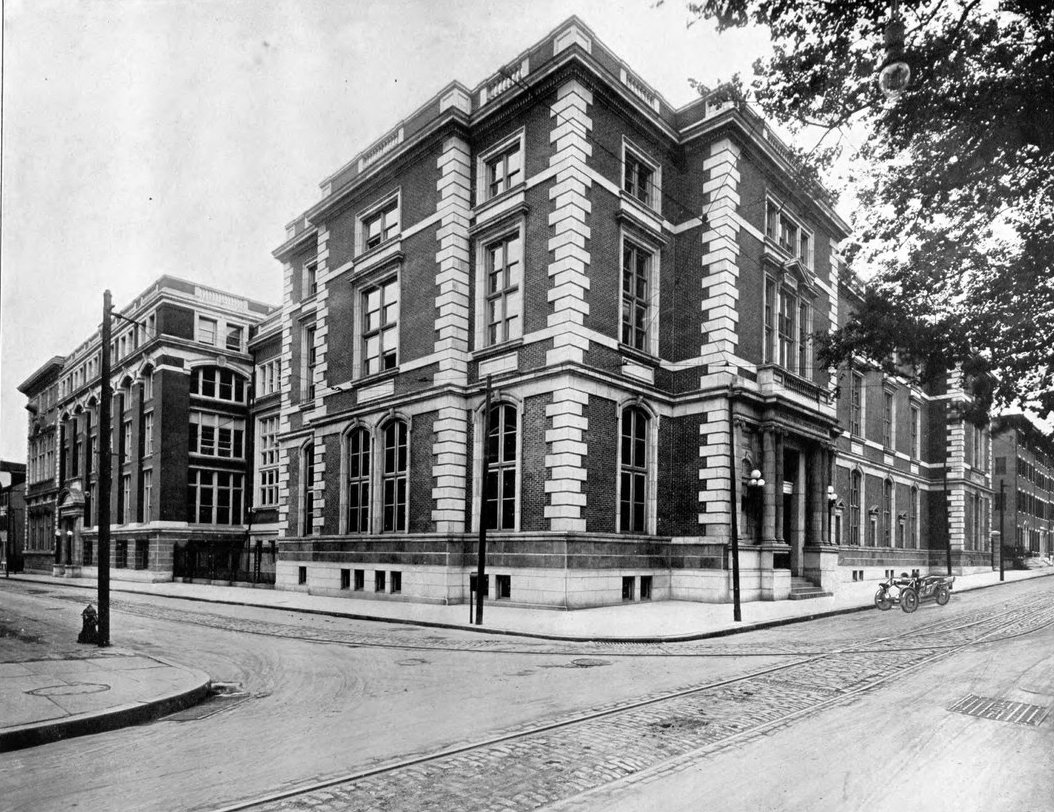
The Academy in 1912

During the first decades of the United States, Philadelphia was the cultural capital and one of the country's commercial centers. Two of the city's institutions, the Library Company and the American Philosophical Society, were centers of enlightened thought and scientific inquiry.

The increasing sophistication of the earth and life sciences, combined with a growing awareness of the variety of life and landscape in the American wilderness, led a small group of naturalists to establish the Academy of Natural Sciences in the winter of 1812. The academy was meant to foster a gathering of fellow naturalists and to nurture the growth and credibility of American science. They frequently looked to their European counterparts for inspiration and expertise and longed to be regarded as equals. On 25 April 1817 they were incorporated into the society under the title of the Academy of Natural Sciences of Philadelphia by the legislature of Pennsylvania. By 1 January 1818, eight members were published.

In 2011, the Academy became affiliated with nearby Drexel University and changed its name to the Academy of Natural Sciences of Drexel University.

=== Financial troubles and closure ===
Throughout the mid-2020s, the Academy faced increasing financial pressures. In September 2025, they announced that they would reduce museum visiting hours and lay off several people. These reduced weekday operating hours also resulted in the cancellation of their children's science camp program in February 2026. After losing her job, the Academy's executive director of engagement and visitor experience would later remark that the museum had laid off 75% of its public-facing staff since 2019.

According to Academy board of trustees chairperson Suzanne Biemiller, the Academy board was given an "ultimatum" in 2025 by Drexel, who gave them the options of merging fully with Drexel, which would give the university ownership of the Academy's assets and collections, or cutting the affiliation completely. As a result, the Academy's leadership was distracted from fundraising or financial planning.

On September 1, 2026, Drexel University announced that the museum would close its doors on September 30, with the museum's last day open to the public with regular hours being the 27. This prompted swift backlash, with local and national groups protesting and rallying to keep the museum's doors open. While leaders at Drexel and the museum cited low visitor numbers, the impact of the pandemic, and rising costs as reasons for closure, longtime staffers pointed to key leadership decisions such as a pivot in audience strategy as important contributing factors to the institution's decline. Leadership were further criticized for the abruptness of the closure and a failure to make any effort to gather support and keep the institution open. The William Penn Foundation expressed interest in providing funding at least a year as a bridge to finding ongoing support and developing a plan for the museum, but Drexel has not accepted the offer. The Academy of Natural Sciences of Drexel University’s museum was closed to the public as of September 27, 2026. During its last month, museum attendance skyrocketed, with attendance levels more than 20 times higher than the previous September.

On September 17, 2026, city councilmembers Jeffery Young Jr. and Nina Ahmad introduced a resolution to authorize Philadelphia's Committee on Legislative Oversight to examine the closure and the financial and governance decisions involved, and consider possibilities for continuing public access to the museum. The resolution was scheduled to be heard on Monday, October 26 at 2 p.m. in City Hall. Deputy Mayor Patricia Wellenbach, who served as senior advisor to the Academy, was called on to testify, but refused, saying she was not the "appropriate" person to speak on behalf of either the Academy or Drexel University. After no one from Drexel's administration attended the hearing, subpoenas were issued for Wellenbach and Drexel president Antonio Merlo, whose absences were called "unacceptable" and "disrespectful" by Councilmembers. Different parties produced differing figures regarding the deficits the Academy was facing, with Drexel's executive director of operations saying the number was $4.4 million, while Suzanne Biemiller produced records saying the shortfall was less than $1 million. In response to allegations that the closure was part of a "land grab" by Drexel meant to open the Academy site to development, Councilmember Young introduced a zoning bill that would block the Academy property from being used for residential or commercial purposes.

In a testimonial on the day of the hearing, Merlo and Drexel university treasurer Helen Bowman argued that given the current Academy building's maintenance costs, reopening it at a different location would be a better option. However, critics have argued that this proposal isn't feasible. Despite the debate over the Academy not being settled, items from it were already loaned to other museums, including the Natural History Museum Abu Dhabi and the Cleveland Museum of Natural History.

When the hearing resumed – with Merlo in attendance – disagreements continued between Academy staff and Drexel leadership over why the museum closed, with Biemiller additionally stating that the Academy board was not consulted on the specimen relocations. Both Merlo and Academy representatives were open to disaffiliation, but couldn't agree on how the Academy would be funded during and after such a transition. Councilmember Isaiah Thomas stated that while he and his fellow Councilmembers were looking into a plan to fund the Academy until a long-term arrangement could be established, the Academy's impasse with Drexel was the biggest obstacle to reopening, as donors would be reluctant to fund it while its relationship with Drexel was unclear.

== Collections and research ==
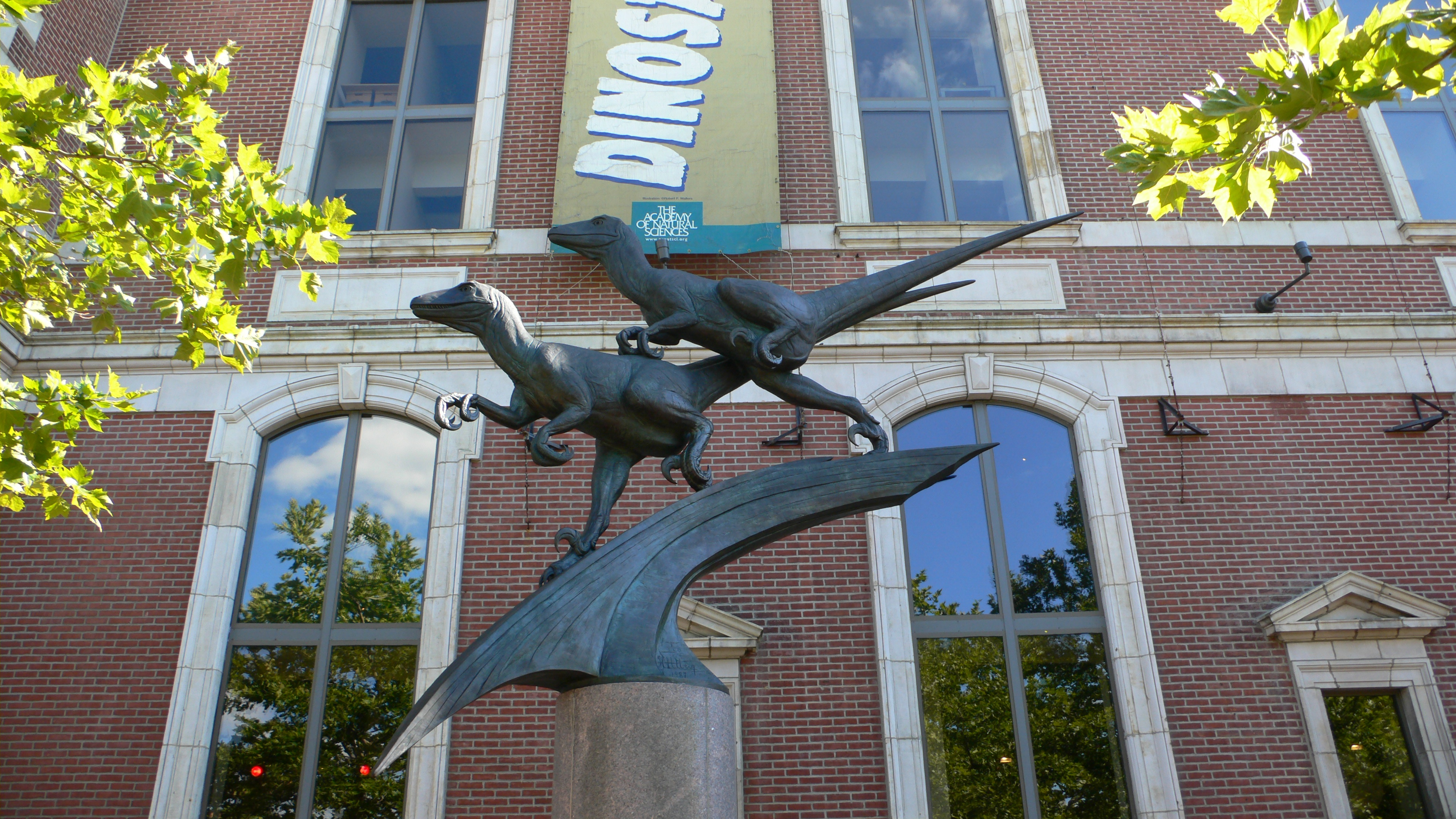
A bronze Deinonychus statue located outside the museum

The Academy of Natural Sciences held an internationally important natural history collection. here were over 18 million biological specimens, and hundreds of thousands of volumes, journals, illustrations, photographs, and archival items in its library. These collections were obtained through multiple means, including the donation or purchase of existing collections or individual items, the collection activities of Academy-sponsored expeditions, or those of individual scientists, whether or not they work at the Academy. Some collections were originally gathered by other institutions. For example, a number of the natural history collections at the American Philosophical Society were relocated to the Academy by the end of the 19th century.

The Academy preserves many type specimens, the reference material that helped establish a species' identity. They also preserved additional specimens with which scientists investigated the nature of these species, their relationships with other species, their evolutionary history, or their conservation status.

=== Museum collections and research programs ===
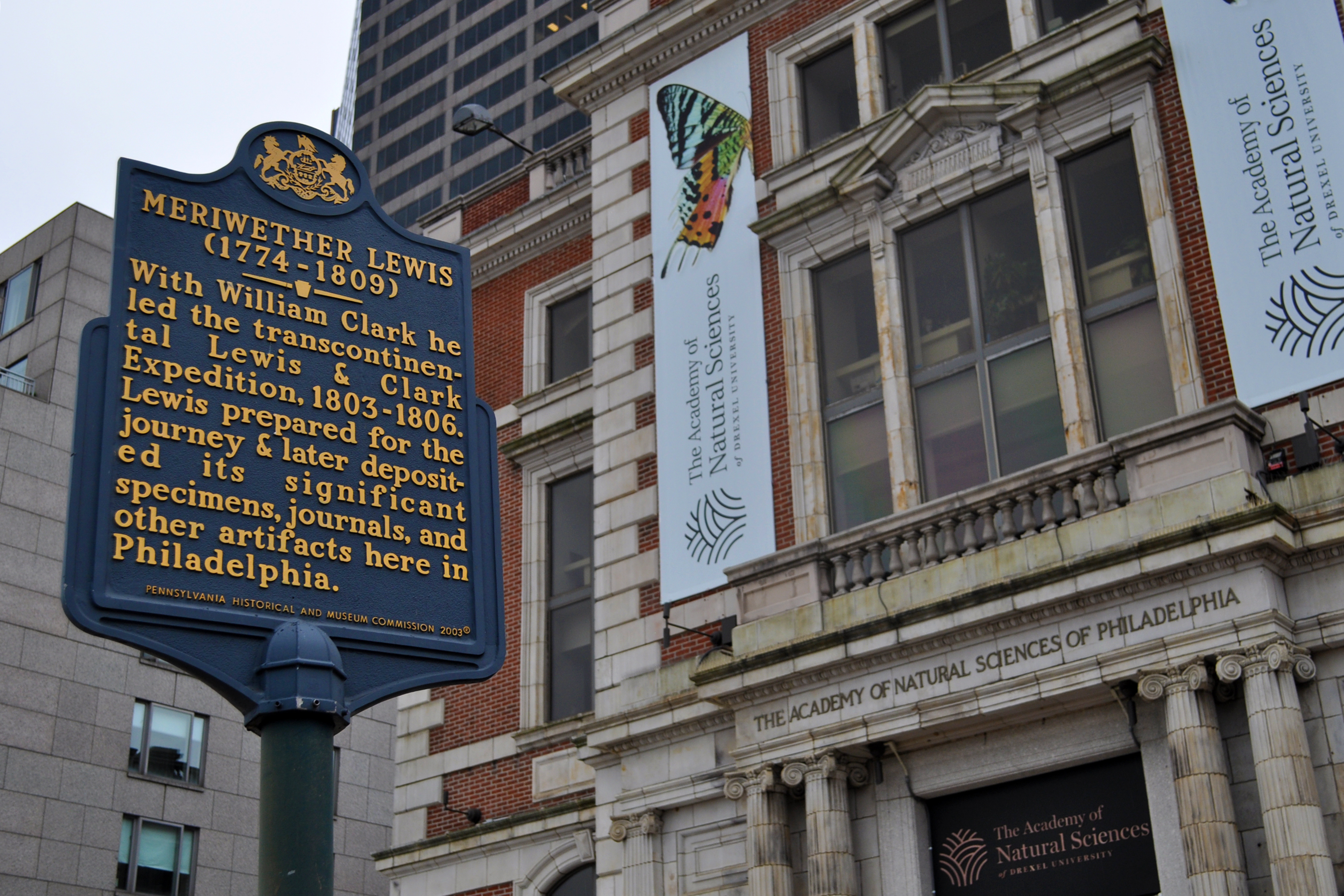
A historical marker outside Academy of Natural Sciences, where Meriwether Lewis met with scientists and purchased supplies in May 1803 before departing on the Lewis and Clark Expedition

The Academy's collections included a wide range of specimens across the tree of life. The museum also maintained several historically important collections.

==== Botany ====
Botany is study of plants, including nonvascular bryophytes (mosses, liverworts, and hornworts) and vascular plants, including ferns, conifers and flowering plants. The field of botany has also traditionally included the study of algae, lichens, and fungi which are now classified in different biological kingdoms. Collections at the Academy, which are housed in the Philadelphia Herbarium (PH), the oldest institutional herbarium in the New World, include some of the oldest and most important botanical collections in the Americas. Notable early collectors include Benjamin Smith Barton, Constatine Rafinesque, Thomas Meehan, Thomas Nuttall, and Fredrick Pursh.

The herbarium contains approximately 1.5 million specimens of vascular plants, fungi, lichens, algae, and fossil plants, 40,000 of which are types. It also contains some special collections, including the plants collected by Johann and Georg Forster during the voyages of Captain James Cook, and by Meriwether Lewis during the Lewis and Clark expedition (Corps of Discovery). The department's current focus is plant biodiversity and evolution focusing on Apocynaceae (milkweed or dogbane family) and Polygalaceae.

==== Diatoms ====
The Academy's Diatom Herbarium, the largest in the Americas and the second largest in the world, contains approximately 220,000 slides of these microscopic algae. The herbarium contains many specimens contributed by notable collectors, a diversity of fossil diatoms, and diatoms collected as part of numerous freshwater environmental surveys in the United States. The Diatom Herbarium also provides collections and taxonomic services for the Phycology Section of the Patrick Center for Environmental Research. Former curators of note include Charles S. Boyer, Ruth Patrick, and Charles Reimer.

==== Entomology ====
Entomology has been important to the Academy since its founding. Two of its earliest members include Thomas Say, regarded as the father of American entomology, and Titian Peale, a leading natural history illustrator and the chief naturalist on the United States Exploring Expedition (1834–1842). The entomology collection currently contains more than 3.5 million specimens and includes the Titian Peale Moth and Butterfly Collection, the oldest entomology collection in the United States. Curator Emeritus, Daniel Otte, an expert on Orthoptera (crickets, grasshoppers, and their relatives) is a pioneer of presenting biological data on the internet through the creation of the Orthoptera Species File. Curator and Entomology Department Chair, Jon Gelhaus is a leading expert on crane flies and manages the Mongolian Aquatic Insect Survey. Margaretta Morris, a former pupil of Say who was among the first women elected to the Academy and the AAAS, conducted pioneering research on Hessian flies, periodical cicadas (first reported the 17-year cicada Magicicada cassini), diving beetles (cited in Darwin's On The Origin of Species), and other agricultural pests.

==== Ichthyology ====
Ichthyology has also been a part of Academy collections and research since its beginnings, but the size of the collection was relatively modest until acquisition of Edward Drinker Cope's personal collections in 1898. A few years later, Henry Weed Fowler began his tenure at the Academy, during which he systematized the collections and described 1,408 species. James E. Böhlke, William Saul, and William Smith-Vaniz are among the scientists who followed Fowler. Curator Emeritus, John Lundberg, an expert in catfishes, pioneered deep channel collecting in large tropical rivers and is the lead author of a seminal scientific paper on the biological and geographic history of the Amazon River Basin. The Ichthyology collection, which currently houses nearly 1.2 million specimens and nearly 3,000 types, is one of the most important such collections in the United States. The department also hosts the All Catfish Species Inventory (a comprehensive online resource on catfish) and Catfish Bones (an online digital atlas of catfish morphology), and is a participant in Neodat II (an online resource of Neotropic ichthyology collections).

==== Malacology ====
Two of the early members of the Academy, Thomas Say and Isaac Lea, were malacologists (see also conchologists). R. Tucker Abbott, Samuel Stehman Haldeman, Henry A. Pilsbry, and George W. Tryon, Jr. were other noted malacologists who worked at the Academy. The Academy's malacology collection is the oldest such collection in the United States and is the 3rd largest in the world. It currently contains over 10 million specimens, including types erected by more than 400 authors. Curator Gary Rosenberg, an expert on Jamaican land snails, is a leader in digitised museum collections and research data. Research websites include the Malacology Georeferencing Project an online database of Western Atlantic Marine Mollusca (Malacolog), and the OBIS Indo-Pacific Mollusc database. Research associate and former curator Danielle Graf, an expert on Unionidae (freshwater mussels), maintains the MUSSEL Project web site.

==== Ornithology ====
The majority of ornithologists active in the United States during the first half of the 19th century, including Charles Lucien Bonaparte, George Ord, Titian Ramsay Peale, John James Audubon, John Cassin, Thomas Nuttall, and John Kirk Townsend, were active members of the Academy. Later notable Academy ornithologists include James Bond, Frank Gill, Rodolphe Meyer de Schauensee, Pete Myers, Fred Sheldon, and Witmer Stone. With nearly 200,000 specimens representing over 9,000 species, the Ornithology collection is one of the largest and most taxonomically complete bird collections in the world. The Delaware Valley Ornithological Club (DVOC) has held regular meetings at the Academy since 1890.

==== Vertebrate paleontology ====
A 43 ft. (13 m) complete fossil specimen of Mosasaur species Tylosaurus rex (with a human for scale) on display

Vertebrate paleontology in the United States originated in Philadelphia through the efforts of naturalists and scientists associated with the American Philosophical Society (APS) during the first decade of the 19th century and at The Academy of Natural Sciences thereafter. By the end of the 19th century, the holdings from the APS, including the Thomas Jefferson Fossil Collection, had been transferred to the Academy for safekeeping. Currently, the collection contains more than 22,000 specimens, including many types. Richard Harlan was an early member who introduced many American naturalists to the groundbreaking works of Georges Cuvier. Joseph Leidy, who described Hadrosaurus and alerted the scientific world to the paleontological treasures of the American West, is considered the "father" of American vertebrate paleontology. Edward Drinker Cope, who also worked extensively on other vertebrates, is best known for his rivalry with Othniel Charles Marsh during the infamous Bone Wars. Curator Edward B. Daeschler studied the evolution of Devonian tetrapods. Daeschler is a co-discoverer of the evolutionarily-transitional "fishapod" Tiktaalik roseae from the Canadian Arctic. He discovered two tetrapods, Hynerpeton and Densignathus from the Catskill Formation in Pennsylvania.

==== Other collections ====
The Academy houses several collections of smaller size yet historical and scientific importance. The general invertebrate collection contains about 22,600 specimens, while the invertebrate paleontology collection contains about 105,000 lots. Both contain numerous type specimens. Generally, 21,500 specimens are gaunt, 13,500 are affiliated skins, and 1,700 are wet-preserved specimens. The Frank J. Myers Rotifer Collection is the most comprehensive collection of rotifers on microslides. The herpetology collection contains about 40,000 specimens, including more than 500 type specimens. The mammalogy collection contains about 36,000 specimens and 180 holotypes. Among the naturalists and scientists associated with these collections are Timothy Conrad, Edward Drinker Cope, Richard Harlan, John Edwards Holbrook, William W. Jefferis, Henry Charles Lea, Isaac Lea, Joseph Leidy, Samuel George Morton, and Thomas Say.

== Notable members ==
Academy members were frequently enlisted to participate in national surveys of the western territories and other major expeditions. Several of its earliest members, including William Bartram, John Godman, Richard Harlan, Angelo Heilprin, Charles Alexandre Lesueur, William Maclure, Titian Peale, Charles Pickering, Thomas Say, and Alexander Wilson were among the pioneers or recognized authorities in their respective areas of study. Thomas Jefferson of Virginia, John Edwards Holbrook of South Carolina, Thomas Nuttall and Richard Owen of the United Kingdom, Georges Cuvier of France, and Alexander von Humboldt of Prussia were among the corresponding members (members who lived far from Philadelphia) of the Academy's first decades.

Later during the 19th century, other notable naturalists and scientists, including John James Audubon, Charles S. Boyer, John Cassin, Edward Drinker Cope, Ezra Townsend Cresson, Richard Harlan, Ferdinand V. Hayden, Isaac Lea, William W. Jefferis, John Lawrence LeConte, Joseph Leidy, Samuel George Morton, George Ord, and James Rehn were members. Corresponding members included Charles Darwin along with his supporters Asa Gray, and Thomas Henry Huxley.

For much of its history, new members had to be nominated by two current members and then elected by the remaining members. These requirements were dropped in 1924. Notable 20th-century scientists include James Böhlke, James Bond, Henry Weed Fowler, Ruth Patrick, Henry Pilsbry, H. Radclyffe Roberts, and Witmer Stone.

=== Patrick Center for Environmental Research ===
Formerly the Limnology Department, the Patrick Center for Environmental Research focuses on applied ecology. Founded in 1947 by Ruth Patrick, formerly of the Diatom Herbarium, it was one of the earliest U.S. environmental consulting concerns. Its attachment to the Academy led it to become the first to employ interdisciplinary teams of scientists to study freshwater systems and the first to regard biodiversity as a central criterion of water quality.

Its 1948 biological survey of the Conestoga River Basin in Pennsylvania, a milestone in environmental research, led to similar surveys and studies throughout much of the United States. Characteristically, these earlier projects were joint projects of the Limnology Department and private industry. Since the rise of the environmental movement in the 1960s and 1970s and the resulting increases in governmental regulation of water pollution, the environmental assessments pioneered at the Academy are increasingly conducted by private environmental consulting firms.

As of 2013, much of the research at the Patrick Center is conducted with regulatory agencies and other governmental bodies, in fields such as diatom autecology, environmental chemistry and toxicology, habitat restoration, long-term environmental trends, species conservation, and watershed management. Some of the work employs most of the center's expertise and capabilities, such as recent studies on the ecological effects of small dams or the ecological benefits of riparian reforestation.

Other studies may involve only one or a couple of the research programs. For example, a current project sampling sediment cores in tidal marshes throughout the Delaware Estuary. This undertaking, possibly the most comprehensive core sampling in any estuary, relies extensively on the center's expertise in biogeochemistry and phycology. Once the sampling is completed, scientist will be able to investigate historical trends in marsh development, carbon, nitrogen and phosphorus cycling, water pollution, salinity variations, and climatic change by analysing the core's sediments, chemistry, and diatom assemblages.

==== Biogeochemistry ====
The Biogeochemistry Section of the Patrick Center is concerned with the influence of aquatic organisms on the sources, fate and transport of chemicals in aquatic systems. Studies frequently deal with the carbon and nutrient cycling as well as those of trace elements (e.g., lead, copper, mercury, and zinc) and organic contaminants such as polychlorinated biphenyls (PCBs), and polycyclic aromatic hydrocarbons (PAHs). The section regularly provides water, sediment and tissue analyses for government, intergovernmental agencies, and private companies from around the country. In addition to the sediment core project mentioned above, it has recently studied the effects of small dams on sediment contaminants, photochemical transformation of marsh-derived dissolved organic matter, and sedimentation and eutrophication in salt marshes.

==== Ecological Modeling ====
The Ecological Modeling Section employs sophisticated and rigorous mathematical modelling techniques to address a variety of questions in basic and applied research. Examples include watershed-scale modeling and risk assessment; nonlinear population models structured by age, body size, or space; particle transport in turbulent aquatic systems; and the ecology and control of exotic invasive plants in urban parks.

==== Fisheries ====
The Fisheries Section of the Patrick Center conducts research into the ecology, conservation, and management of lotic and estuarine fishes. Studies may range from the analysis of fish tissues for contaminants, monitoring fish populations for environmental assessments, to investigating the life histories of individual species. Recent and ongoing work include, glass eel (the larvae of freshwater or American eels) recruitment in the Delaware River basin, the ecology and genetics of bridal shiner (a fish that's endangered in Pennsylvania), and the impacts of flow management (dam releases) in the Upper Delaware River to native and introduced fish populations.

==== Macroinvertebrates ====
Benthic macroinvertebrates (primarily aquatic insects, crustaceans, and mollusks) are useful for biological monitoring programs. Their varied life spans, ranging from weeks to years, are long enough to reveal intermittent and continuous pollutants, yet short enough respond to worsening or improving water quality. The Macroinvertebrate Section at the Patrick Center has extensive experience in bioassessment, biomonitoring, and inventorying of freshwater habitats throughout the United States.

==== Phycology ====
Because of their great diversity and specific ecological requirements, algae, particularly diatoms, make excellent indicators of water quality. Moreover, diatoms are readily preserved in sediments, which make them useful organisms for studying paleolimnology (the long-term trends of streams and lakes). The Phycology Section of the Patrick Center provides algal analyses for governmental and other agencies interested in both assessing water quality and long-term environmental trends. One such undertaking is the analyses of diatom assemblages in lake sediments (sediment cores) throughout the eastern United States. This work, part of a large project managed by the EPA, will try to establish reference (pre-anthropogenic) conditions for lakes throughout the country.

In addition to these research efforts, the Phycology Section of the Patrick Center has developed a set of online resources for using algae in environmental research. These include an algal image database, autecology datasets for freshwater algae, algae research with the USGS National Water-Quality Assessment (NAWQA) program, and a diatom paleolimnology database.

=== Laboratory for Molecular Systematics and Ecology ===
For most of its history, biological taxonomy and systematics were conducted using comparative morphology. In recent decades, however, advances in molecular biology and computational technologies have opened new possibilities for studying the diversity and history of life through the use of cladistics and computational phylogenetics. These technologies also offer new opportunities for molecular ecology and conservation genetics.

Academy scientists have been early adapters of molecular biology techniques. Allozymes, DNA-DNA hybridization, immunoelectrophoresis, restriction site analyses of mitochondrial DNA and serology were used extensively since the late 1960s. Recent molecular work mainly employs DNA sequencing, microsatellites, and AFLP (amplified fragment length polymorphism). In 2004, the Laboratory for Molecular Systematics and Ecology (LMSE) was formed as a shared, multi-user facility to improve access to and provide training for the use of molecular data in systematic and ecological research. In addition to supporting staff, the lab offers research opportunities for students and post-doctoral fellowships.

==== Hovsgol ====
The Academy's work in Mongolia started with the realization of the unique research opportunities available at Lake Hovsgol (Hovsgol Nuur). This large lake and its watershed were remarkably pristine and relatively unknown, especially in comparison to its sister lake in Russia, Lake Baikal. In 1995, a multidisciplinary team of scientists from the Academy, as well as from other American institutions, Mongolia, Russia, and Japan started a multi-year study of the lake's biodiversity, limnology, and watershed.

Although this research was scientifically rewarding, it was apparent that issues concerning environmental protection and sustainable economic development needed addressing. Consequently, work at Hovsgol shifted to ecosystem studies and capacity building. One early undertaking was the enhancement of the operational and physical infrastructure at Hovsgol National Park. Long-term ecological monitoring of several tributary watersheds began in 1997 and soon the site would be adopted into the International Long Term Ecological Research Network.

Recent work at Hovsgol is focusing on the consequences of and sustainable responses to climate change. The region lies in a transitional zone between the semi-arid Eurasian Steppe (grasslands) to the south and the Eurasian Taiga (boreal forest) to the north. As such, it is an ideal mid-continental site at which to monitor the ecological effects of climate change. In addition, changes in livestock herding practices raise concerns about overgrazing and desertification. In response, the team at Hovsgol created and distributed a Herder Handbook and continues to conduct research and work with nomadic herders to develop sustainable practices.

==== Mongolian Aquatic Insect Survey ====
The Mongolian Aquatic Insect Survey is a multi-year biodiversity survey, environmental monitoring and capacity building project managed by Jon Gelhaus of the Academy's Entomology Department. A total of 217 sites from the Selenge River Basin, the most populous and most extensive drainage in Mongolia, were surveyed from 2003 to 2006. Most of these sites are in rivers or streams, but some are in freshwater and saltwater lakes, hot and cold springs, and marsh wetlands. Additional sites from the remote drainage systems in western Mongolia will be sampled in 2008.

The survey has yielded numerous new species and hundreds of geographic records for known aquatic insects, provided an extensive dataset for ongoing environmental monitoring, and has helped develop research and technical infrastructures in Mongolia. This capacity building includes, in collaboration with the Institute of Meteorology and Hydrology, the building of the first research laboratory in Mongolia dedicated to the study of aquatic invertebrates. It also includes training of Mongolian scientists and students.

=== Center for Environmental Policy ===
The Center for Environmental Policy informs and engages various constituents, promotes solutions, and builds public and professional awareness on important environmental topics. Much of its activities focus on public programs and working groups.

The center hosts or participates in a number of public programs that are free and open to the public. Urban Sustainability Forums feature panels of local and national experts discussing environmental and sustainability topics as they relate to the Philadelphia region. Town Square, which may feature a panel or an individual, addresses a variety of topics relating to the environment or public science. The center also hosts candidate forums, conferences and workshops.

The center acts as a logistical hub for a number of Working Groups organized around sustainability issues. Currently active groups include one for condominium and building co-op owners, a network of faith-based environmental groups, and a forum of senior executives in the private sector.

=== Ewell Sale Stewart Library ===
The Library and Archives were established at the Academy's founding meeting in 1812 for the purpose of supporting its natural science research. The library provides online access, services, collections, imaging, and shared resources with other libraries.

The library houses nearly 200,000 volumes ranging from works published in the 16th century to current journals and books. Its holdings also include illustrated works from as early as the 15th century, including Konrad Gessner's Historia animalium, Maria Sibylla Merian's Insects of Surinam, Edward Lear's Psittacidae or Parrots, and a double elephant folio of John James Audubon's The Birds of America.

=== Scientific publications ===
The Journal of the Academy of Natural Sciences was the first peer-reviewed publication in the United States devoted to the natural sciences. The first volume was published in 1817. By 1842, it had been superseded by the Proceedings of the Academy of Natural Sciences. The Proceedings have been published continuously since 1841. The Journal was reborn in 1847 as a larger-format publication that could accommodate longer articles and monographs. The last volume was issued in 1918.

The Academy publishes three other series. The occasional series Notulae Naturae began in 1939 as a means to quickly publish short items, usually not longer than 16 pages on subject areas such as zoology, botany, ecology, geology and paleontology. The Monographs series, which began in 1935, is composed principally of larger systematic reviews of selected taxonomic groups. The Special Publications series, begun in 1922, includes works such as biography, taxonomy, historical reviews, and collections surveys.

=== VIREO ===
VIREO (VIsual REsource for Ornithology) is the most comprehensive collection of bird images in the world. Started in 1979, the collection contains over 180,000 photographs representing over 7,300 species. The collection contains work by some of the world's most talented photographers. VIREO licenses bird images for a wide variety of commercial and non-profit uses.

== Exhibits and public programs ==
=== Public exhibits ===
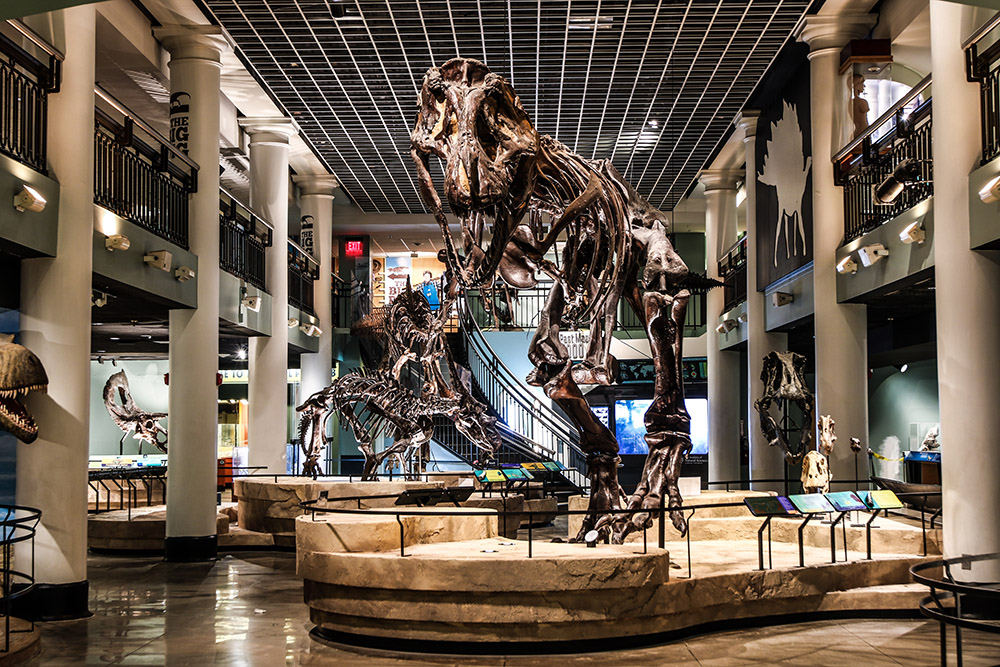
T. rex on display in Dinosaur Hall

The Academy first opened its collections to the public in 1828. The popularity of its exhibits soared in 1868 with the debut of the world's first mounted dinosaur skeleton, Hadrosaurus. The size of the crowds flocking to this display prompted the Academy to relocate to its present-and roomier-location in 1876.

==== Collections and the public ====
As with most museums in the 19th century, there was little separation of the Academy's collections, which were vital to scientific work, and the public spaces. Not only did this subject the collections to extra wear and tear, but visitors were typically confronted with a bewildering assemblage of specimens with little in the way of supplemental information. Over time, however, museums such as the Academy started to showcase their more popular specimens while sequestering the bulk of the collections. In addition, they spent more effort interpreting their public displays. Museums started to play a more active role in educating the public.

==== Dioramas ====
One expression of this transformation was the rise of that icon of natural history museums, the diorama. These three-dimensional displays were the virtual reality of their time, providing generations of museum visitors with their only opportunity to experience distant places and exotic wildlife.

In 1929 program coordinator Harold T. Green created The Academy's first diorama, depicting rocky mountain goats. Green's work was at first controversial amongst The Academy's staff, due to both the cost and accusations of sensationalism, but proved popular amongst the public. In 1935, the Works Progress Administration began providing artists to help work on the dioramas, fueling the exhibits' continued expansion.

By presenting the wilderness to the public, dioramas nurtured an appreciation of our natural heritage, which, coincided with the growth of the Conservation Movement in the United States. The Academy had 37 dioramas, most of which were installed in the 1930s and 1940s. They feature a variety of animals from Africa, Asia, and North America. Some of these, such as the caribou, lion, and plains zebra are familiar and relatively common, but others, such as the desert bighorn, kiang, Kodiak bear, panda, and passenger pigeon, are threatened, endangered, or extinct.

In 2018, under the management of Drexel University, The Academy renovated some of the older dioramas. These renovations were meant to increase the scientific accuracy of the displays and improve their aesthetics.

==== Dinosaurs ====
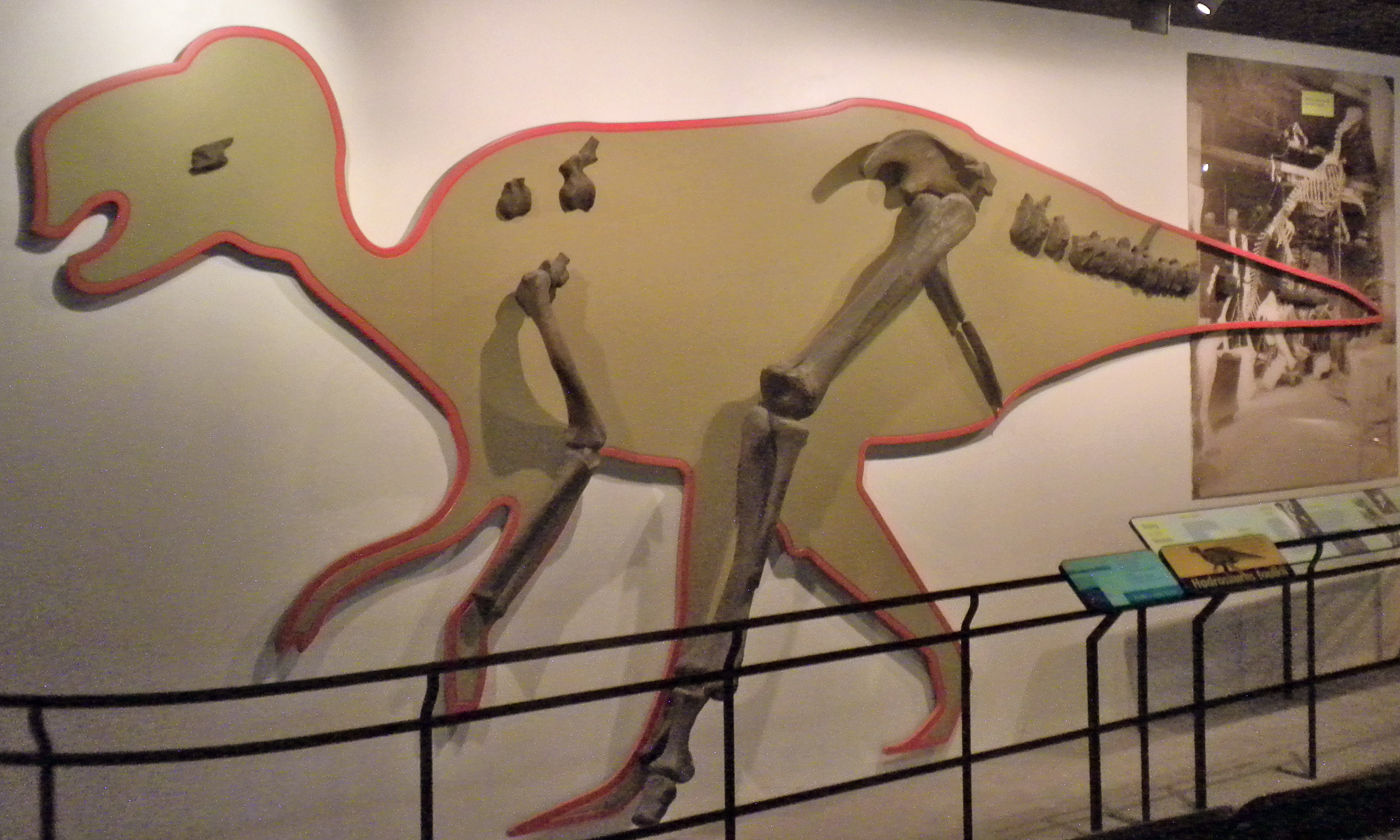
A display of casts of the 35 bones of the Hadrosaurus

Another icon of natural history museums is the dinosaur skeleton. The first of these, the Hadrosaurus mount created by noted natural history artist Benjamin Waterhouse Hawkins, made its debut at the Academy in 1868. Hadrosaurus mounts also found their way into other public venues, including Princeton University, the Royal Scottish Museum, the Smithsonian, and the 1876 American Centennial Exposition. A special exhibit on the history of Hadrosaurus foulkii ran from November 22, 2008 to April 19, 2009.

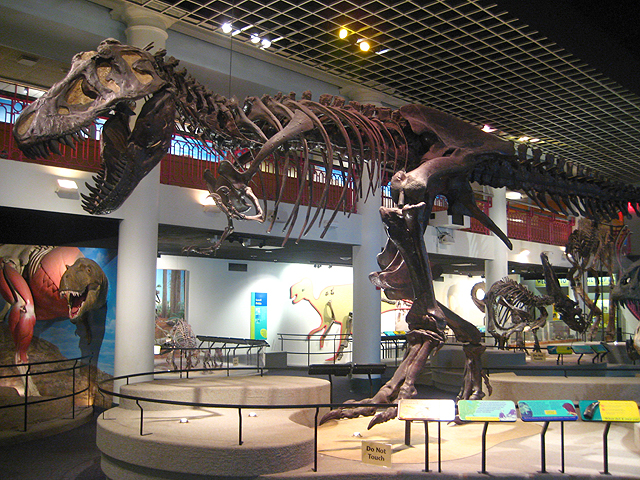
A complete Tyrannosaurus rex fossil cast on display with other dinosaur specimens

A skeletal mount of a related dinosaur, Corythosaurus, served as the centerpiece of the Academy's "Hall of Earth History" during the middle of the 20th century. In 1986, the Academy opened a new exhibit, "Discovering Dinosaurs". This was the first large-scale exhibit to incorporate the findings of the "dinosaur renaissance". Instead of cold-blooded and lumbering reptiles, dinosaurs were conceived as active-and possibly warm-blooded-animals more akin to birds than reptiles.

In 1979, another type of dinosaur was the subject of an exhibition at the academy when it featured Jim Gary's Twentieth Century Dinosaurs and found that it was an enormous success with the public. This unconventional exhibition for a museum of science that featured contemporary sculpture, which focused upon the subjects of intense scientific inquiry, began a trend among its peer institutions, who then began to invite Gary and several other artists who specialized in scientific topics and subjects to museums that always had shied away from anything identified as "contemporary art" as exhibitions.

==== Other exhibits ====
In 1979, the academy also opened "Outside-In", a hands-on children's nature museum. In 1995, it pioneered the hands-on simulation of a dinosaur dig, with its "The Big Dig". Other permanent exhibits include "Secrets of the Diorama", an insight into what goes into a diorama, and "Science at the Academy", which showcases current Academy research.

The museum also has special, changing exhibits. Recent changing exhibits include "Skin: Living Armor, Evolving Identity", "Illuminating Birds", "Extreme Deep: Mission to the Abyss", and "Crocs: Ancient Predators in a Modern World".

=== Public programs ===
==== Festivals ====
Four weekend festivals organized around scientific disciplines, are held during the year. Paleopalooza, held in mid-February, features fossil collections and talks by leading paleontologists. Earth Day Festival, held in mid-April, features scientists from the Academy's Patrick Center for Environmental Research. Bug Fest, held in mid August, features entomologists, insect collections and live insects. The Philadelphia Shell Show, held in mid-October, features an international shell market and competitive shell displays.

==== Programs for adults ====
The Academy began offering lectures to the public as early as the 1820s. Current offerings include natural history author talks, lectures by scientists, workshops and classes. In addition, the Center for Environmental Policy produces public programs on environmental issues.

==== Programs for families and children ====
Since its Nature Club in the 1930s, the Academy has offered programming just for children. Several programs appropriate for different age groups are currently offered. Safari Overnight sleepovers (camp-ins) are held on selected weekends during Fall, Winter, and Spring. Boy Scouts and Girl Scouts can participate in day workshops and sleepovers to fulfill badge and pin requirements. Tiny Tot Explorers is a program for toddlers. A new series of Family Workshops designed for both adults and children was launched in early 2010.

"Wild Weekends", held on selected weekends throughout the year, offer a variety of children's programs, including hands-on exploration of museum specimens, crafts and live animal shows with mammals, birds and reptiles. Live animal shows are also presented at regular times on other days and featured prominently in the educational programs.

=== Educational programs ===
==== Field trips and outreach ====
Field trips to the Academy are available throughout the year for schools, summer camps and other groups. Optional directed programs include Discovery Lessons for younger age groups (pre-K and higher) and Science Explorers for older children (grades 7 through 9). "Academy on the Go" is an educational outreach program that visits schools, camps, and community centers.

==== Women in Natural Sciences ====
WINS (Women in Natural Sciences) is a science enrichment program at The Academy of Natural Sciences for students attending Philadelphia public and charter schools. Founded in 1982, the program provides hands-on science activities, career and college exploration and youth development opportunities. Upon the Academy's closure, the WINS program spun off from the Academy and Drexel and now operates independently.

==== Other programs ====
Academy Explorers Camp is a day camp program offered during Spring Break and the Summer. The George Washington Carver Science Fair is held in February or March. Science fair participants are eligible for the George Washington Carver Scholars summer program, which is also held at the Academy. Educator workshops are held throughout the year. The most recent series covered the integration of science and literacy skills. Self-guided workbooks tailored for younger children are available for some of the museum exhibits.

== Awards and research opportunities ==
=== Hayden Memorial Geological Award ===
The Hayden Memorial Geological Award is given to prominent scientists working in geology or paleontology. It was established in 1888 in memory of Ferdinand V. Hayden, a distinguished American geologist and pioneering surveyor of the American West who had extensive ties to the Academy.

=== Gold Medal for Distinction in Natural History Art ===
Established in 1980, the Gold Medal for Distinction in Natural History Art is awarded to people whose artistic endeavors and life's work have contributed to our understanding and appreciation of living things.

The recipients as of 2026 are:

- 1980: Roger Tory Peterson
- 1981: Ansel Adams
- 1982: Sir Peter Scott
- 1983: Eliot Porter
- 1984: Peter Matthiessen
- 1987: BBC Natural History Unit
- 1992: William Cooper
- 1995: Guy Tudor
- 2005: John McPhee
- 2007: Ray Troll
- 2012: James Prosek
- 2025: Robert Peck

=== Richard Hopper Day Memorial Medal ===
The Richard Hopper Day Memorial Medal, established in 1960 by his granddaughter, Margaret Day Dilks, is awarded in recognition of outstanding contributions in interpreting the natural sciences to the public. As of 2026, the recipients are:

- 1960: Jacques Piccard, Don Walsh, Andreas Rechnitzer, Lawrence A. Shumaker,
- 1964: L. S. B. Leakey
- 1966: H. Bradford Washburn
- 1967: Charles A. Berry
- 1969: Ruth Patrick
- 1973: Harrison H. Schmitt
- 1979: Stanton A. Waterman
- 1980: Crawford H. Greenewalt
- 1983: David Attenborough
- 1985: Lewis Thomas
- 1988: Gerald Durrell
- 1991: Robert McCracken Peck
- 1997: Stephen E. Ambrose
- 2000: Thomas Lovejoy
- 2004: Sylvia Earle
- 2010: Scott Weidensaul

=== Joseph Leidy Award ===
The Joseph Leidy Award honors research in the natural sciences. It was established in 1923 as a tribute to the many contributions and long association of Joseph Leidy with the Academy.

=== Endowments and fellowships ===
The Böhlke Memorial Endowment Fund honors the memory of James E. Böhlke and Eugenia B. Böhlke who were prominent ichthyologists at the Academy. This fund provides support for graduate students and recent postdoctoral researchers to work with the Ichthyology Collection and the Academy's Library.

The John J. & Anna H. Gallagher Fellowship provides a unique opportunity for original, multi-year, postdoctoral or sabbatical research on the systematics of microscopic invertebrates, especially Rotifera. The research focus must be on systematics and may employ ecological, behavioral, physiological, molecular or developmental tools.

Jessup and McHenry Awards are competitively awarded to students wishing to conduct studies at the postgraduate, doctoral and postdoctoral levels under the supervision or sponsorship of a member of the curatorial staff of the Academy. The Jessup Award is given for any specialty in which our curators have expertise. The McHenry Fund is restricted to botanists.

The Eckelberry Endowment helps support the efforts of wildlife painters, sculptors, printmakers, and other artists to better acquaint themselves with the natural world through both museum and field research. In addition, artistic and scientific mentors counsel and assist these artists as their careers develop. One grant will be given each year.

== See also ==
- Academy Glacier (Greenland)
- American Philosophical Society: The first "learned society" in the Americas, and an important scientific and cultural institution in Philadelphia.
- Drexel University: The Philadelphia-based university with which the Academy is now affiliated.
- Franklin Institute: Another Philadelphia science museum.
- Library Company of Philadelphia: The "mother of all subscription libraries", the Library Company was founded in 1731.
- List of natural history museums
- List of natural history museums in the United States
- Logan Square: A landmark adjacent to the Academy that contains the Swann Memorial Fountain.
- Please Touch Museum, a children's museum that was housed within the Academy before moving in 1981.
- Wagner Free Institute of Science: A museum of a museum (a Victorian era Natural History museum) located in Philadelphia.
- Witmer Stone
