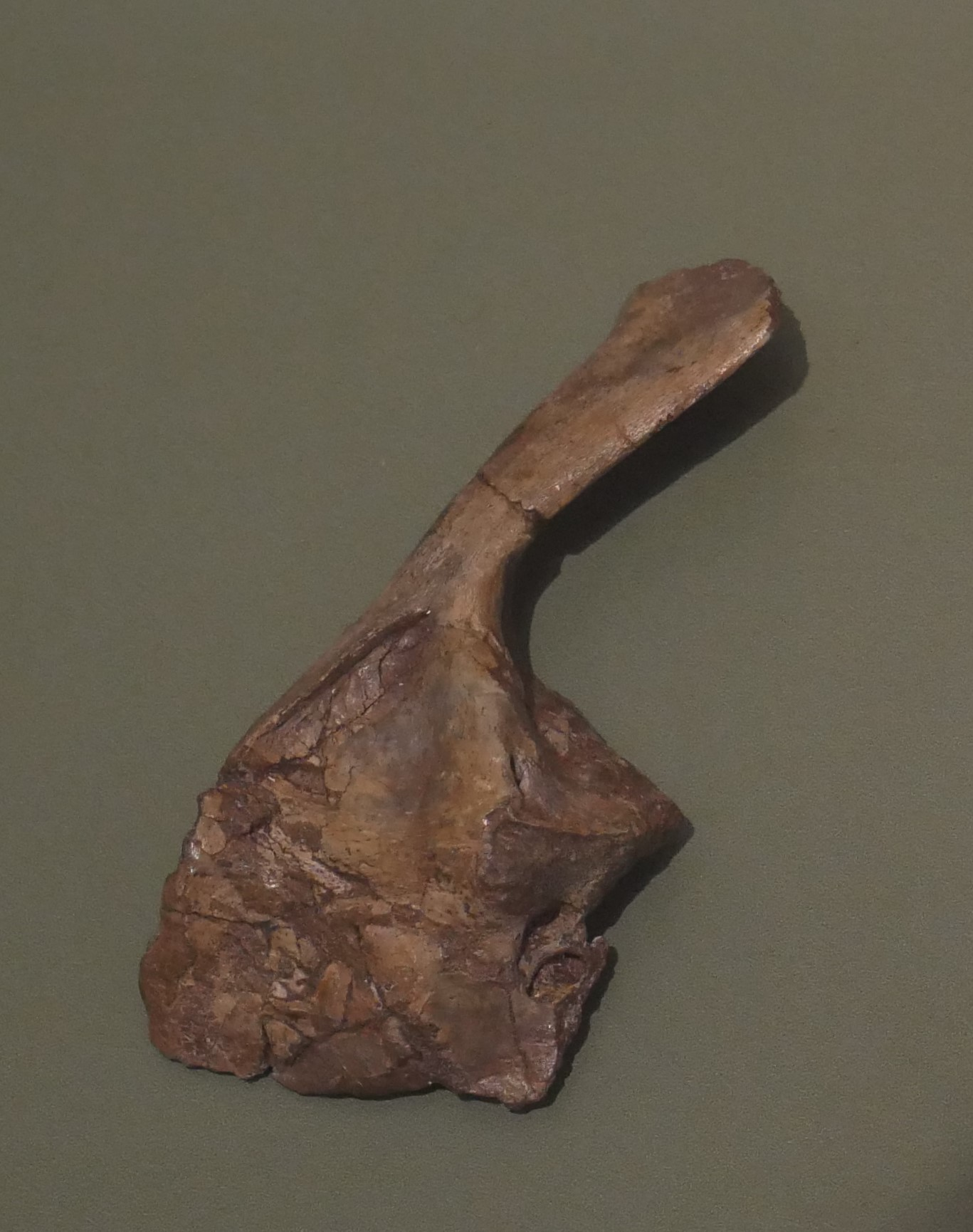
- The holotype fossil of Hynerpeton, a left shoulder girdle in lateral (external) view

Scientific classification
- Kingdom: Animalia
- Phylum: Chordata
- Clade: Stegocephali
- Genus: †Hynerpeton
- Species: †H. bassetti

Binomial name
- †Hynerpeton bassetti Daeschler et al., 1994

= Hynerpeton =

Hynerpeton Temporal range: Late Devonian (Late Famennian)

Extinct genus of tetrapodomorphs

Hynerpeton (/haɪˈnɜːrpətɒn/ lit. 'creeping animal from Hyner') is an extinct genus of early four-limbed vertebrate that lived in the rivers and ponds of Pennsylvania during the Late Devonian period, during the Late Fammenian stage. The only known species of Hynerpeton is H. bassetti, named after the describer's grandfather, city planner Edward Bassett. Hynerpeton is known for being the first Devonian four-limbed vertebrate discovered in the United States, as well as possibly being one of the first to have lost internal (fish-like) gills.

This genus is known from few remains discovered at the Red Hill fossil site in Hyner, Pennsylvania. The most notable fossil is a large endochondral shoulder girdle consisting of the cleithrum, scapula, and coracoid (but not the interclavicle and clavicles), all connected into one shoulder bone. The inner surface of this shoulder bone possesses an array of depressions believed to have been attachment points for a unique set of powerful muscles around the chest. This may have given Hynerpeton improved mobility and weight-bearing abilities compared to other Devonian limbed vertebrates such as Ichthyostega and Acanthostega. The cleithrum (upper blade of the shoulder) is fused to the scapulocoracoid (lower plate of the shoulder, in front of the shoulder socket), unlike in most tetrapods. Conversely, the shoulder girdle is independent of the skull, unlike in most fish.

Early four-limbed vertebrates are often referred to as tetrapods, according to a trait-based definition of the term as commonly used by most paleontologists. Devonian animals like Hynerpeton, Ichthyostega, and Acanthostega are excluded from the crown group Tetrapoda, since they evolved prior to the common ancestor of modern amphibians (Lissamphibia), reptiles, mammals, and birds. For specialists who prefer a neontological definition of tetrapods (i.e., only in the context of modern life), alternative terms for non-crown tetrapods include "stem-tetrapod" or "stegocephalian".

Hynerpeton hails from the Red Hill fossil site, which, during the Late Devonian, was a warm floodplain inhabited by a diverse ecosystem of aquatic fish and terrestrial invertebrates. Hynerpeton was one of several genera of four-limbed vertebrates known from the site, although it was the first to be discovered. Some paleontologists have proposed that animals like Hynerpeton made use their amphibious lifestyle to find shallow pools where they could spawn, isolated from predatory fish which inhabited the deeper rivers.

== History ==
In 1993, paleontologists Edward "Ted" Daeschler and Neil Shubin found the first Hynerpeton fossil at the Red Hill fossil site near Hyner, Pennsylvania, USA. They were surveying the Devonian rocks of Pennsylvania in search of fossil evidence for the origin of limbed vertebrates. This initial find was a robust left endochondral shoulder girdle, belonging to an animal which had powerful appendages. This fossil, designated ANSP 20053, is now considered the holotype specimen of Hynerpeton, which Daeschler and his colleagues formally named in an article published by Science Magazine in 1994. At the time of its discovery, Hynerpeton was the oldest four-limbed vertebrate known from the United States, and its presence in a complex ecosystem such as that preserved at Red Hill helped to answer some of Daeschler and Shubin's questions on the origin and lifestyle of limbed vertebrates. The generic name Hynerpeton is in reference to Hyner and herpeton ("creeping animal"), a Greek word which is commonly used as a suffix for newly named ancient amphibians. The specific name, bassetti, is named in honor of Edward M. Bassett, an American city planner and Daeschler's grandfather.

The most fossiliferous layer of the Red Hill site, the "Hynerpeton lens", was named after the genus. It is believed to have been deposited during the Upper Famennian stage, about 361 million years ago. Since 1993, more stegocephalian remains have been found in the Hynerpeton lens (also known as the Farwell paleosols). These include shoulder bones, jaw bones, skull fragments, gastralia (belly scutes), a femur, and a large and unusually-shaped humerus. In 2000, a pair of jaw bones were assigned to a second genus, Densignathus, and other studies have argued that several additional unnamed taxa were present at the site, including possibly the oldest known whatcheeriid.

Some of this material has been assigned to Hynerpeton, but in many cases, these assignments were reverted. For example, paleontologist Jenny Clack referred several addition fossils to the genus in her 1997 review of Devonian trackways. These fossils, which had not been previously noted in the scientific literature, included a jugal (cheek bone), belly scutes, and a portion of the mandible (lower jaw). In 2000, Daeschler described the mandible (ANSP 20901) in more depth, and compared and contrasted it with the remains of Densignathus. A more comprehensive review of Red Hill "tetrapod" fossils was undertaken by Daeschler, Clack, and Shubin in 2009. They noted that most fossils were assigned to Hynerpeton based on their close proximity to the point where the original endochondral shoulder girdle was discovered. However, they argued that, since there were other unique animals (i.e. Densignathus, the owner of the unusual humerus, and whatcheerids) close to this point, proximity was not a sufficient reason to consider these referrals valid. Therefore, they did not consider the remains described by Clack (1997) and Daeschler (2000) to be guaranteed examples of Hynerpeton material. Nevertheless, they did retain a referred left cleithrum, ANSP 20054, within the genus due to its structure being practically identical to that of the holotype.

In 2025, ecology club students at Bucktail High School in Renovo started campaigning to change the Pennsylvania state fossil to Hynerpeton. Since 1988, the Pennsylvania state fossil has been Eldredgeops rana, a common species of Devonian trilobite.

== Description ==
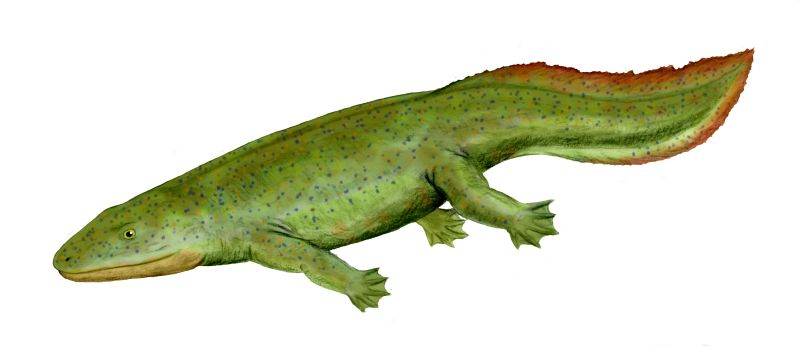
Highly speculative life restoration by Nobu Tamura

Hynerpeton individuals were presumably similar to other early limbed vertebrates ("tetrapods") such as Ichthyostega or Acanthostega. Although a lack of sufficient fossil material makes it unwise to come to specific conclusions about the anatomy of Hynerpeton, the structure of the preserved endochondral shoulder girdle offers some information on its classification. The endochondral shoulder girdle is the portion of the shoulder girdle containing the scapula, coracoid, and cleithrum, but not the clavicles and interclavicle. As a whole, the endochondral shoulder girdle is massive and cleaver-shaped. The upward-pointing "shaft" is formed by the cleithrum, a blade-like bone of the shoulder girdle lost by most amniotes. The rear-pointing "blade" is formed by the scapulocoracoid, a plate-like bone which also possesses the glenoid fossa (shoulder socket) along its rear edge and in later tetrapods would separate into the scapula and coracoid. In lobe-finned fish ancestral to tetrapods, such as Eusthenopteron, the endochondral shoulder girdle was attached to the skull. In true tetrapods, the endochondral shoulder girdle is divided into two separate bones: the cleithrum and scapulocoracoid. Hynerpeton is intermediate between these two states, as the endochondral shoulder girdle is separated from the skull but not yet divided into two separate bones. In this way Hynerpeton is comparable to Devonian stem-tetrapods rather than true tetrapods, which did not appear in the fossil record until the Carboniferous. Based on the size of the bone, the Hynerpeton individual to which it belonged had an estimated length of 0.7 meters (2.3 feet).

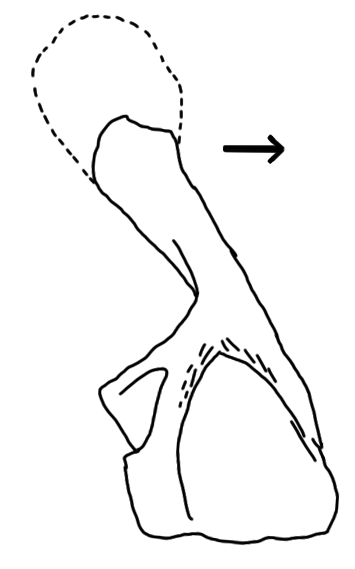
Line drawing of the holotype left shoulder girdle in medial (internal) view

The cleithrum portion is smooth, unlike the rough-textured cleithrum of tetrapodomorph fish. In addition, the upper portion of the cleithrum is expanded and slightly tilted forwards, a derived character similar to Tulerpeton and true tetrapods. The scapulocoracoid region is large when seen from the side but very thin when seen from below. The glenoid fossa (shoulder socket) is positioned on the posterolateral (outer and rear) edge of the scapulocoracoid, a position significantly more lateral than other Devonian tetrapods (apart from Tulerpeton). Above the glenoid fossa is a raised area known as the supraglenoid buttress.

Hynerpeton also has several autapomorphies, unique features which no other known stem-tetrapod possesses. The inner face of the scapulocoracoid has a large, deep depression known as a subscapular fossa. The upper rim of this depression is very roughly textured due to being covered with muscle scars. The rear edge of the subscapular fossa, on the other hand, is formed by a massive raised area, known as an infraglenoid buttress. A second depression known as the infraglenoid fossa, which is continuous with the glenoid fossa, wraps around the rear of the bone to bisect the infraglenoid buttress.

These characteristics combined seem to support the idea that Hynerpeton had very powerful muscles attached to the scapulocoracoid portion of the endochondral shoulder girdle. The infraglenoid fossa is particularly well-developed in this genus, and may have been an origin point for retractor muscles. A similar groove on the front edge of the bone may have helped with elevating or protracting the limb. The rim of the subscapular fossa also evidently provided a site for muscle attachment. As these features are unknown in other stem- and crown-tetrapods, it is likely that Hynerpeton's musculature was used for some unique, experimental form of movement that did not survive the Devonian. The original describers suggested that strong muscles could have been equally viable for walking or swimming.

Unlike most of its contemporaries, Hynerpeton seems to lack a postbranchial lamina. This blade of bone, preserved in many fish and some stem-tetrapods (Acanthostega, for example) extends lengthwise along the inner edge of the cleithrum. It typically forms the rear wall of the branchial chamber (gill cavity), and may have helped ensure that water flows in a single direction through the gills. Its absence in Hynerpeton may indicate that it lacked gills, and that the Hynerpeton lineage may have been among the first vertebrates to evolve this adaptation. However, this interpretation is not without controversy. Janis & Farmer (1999) noted that postbranchial laminae were absent in some eusthenopterid fish (which retained gill bones) and present in Whatcheeria (which had no evidence for gills despite well-preserved remains). Shoch & Witzmann (2011) note that it is not always clear when or how postbranchial laminae are preserved due to the divergent morphology of many stegocephalian cleithra. In addition, they point out that aquatic salamanders, which breathe with external gills, do not require nor possess postbranchial laminae. Daeschler et al. (1994) considered the loss of the postbranchial lamina to be a derived feature indicating that Hynerpeton was more "advanced" than Acanthostega. On the contrary, Schoch & Witzmann (2011) found evidence for a postbranchial lamina in crown-tetrapods such as the temnospondyls Trematolestes and Plagiosuchus. Thus, Hynerpeton's loss of a postbranchial lamina (and possibly internal gills) likely evolved independently of crown-tetrapods.

== Classification ==
The original 1994 description of Hynerpeton tentatively placed it within the order Ichthyostegalia of the superclass Tetrapoda. At the time, "Tetrapoda" referred to any four-limbed vertebrate and "Ichthyostegalia" referred to "primitive", Ichthyostega-like Devonian members of the category. However, the arrival and popularity of cladistics has altered both of these terms. Many paleontologists continue to use the traditional definition of "tetrapod"; a few instead opt for a cladistic definition which restricts the term to the crown group, a clade (relations-based grouping) containing only descendants of the most recent common ancestor of living tetrapods. While Hynerpeton is a tetrapod in the sense that it is a four-limbed vertebrate, it is not a member of the tetrapod crown group, as its lineage went extinct long before the lineages of modern tetrapods evolved. Likewise, "Ichthyostegalia" has been abandoned in the age of cladistics due to being an evolutionary grade leading to true tetrapods, rather than a relations-based clade. The traditional, non-cladistic definition of Tetrapoda, which begins at the earliest limbed vertebrates, is roughly equivalent to a clade named Stegocephali, which is defined as all animals more closely related to temnospondyls than to Pandericthys.

Hynerpeton has not been included in many phylogenetic analyses due to its limited amount of fossil material. Those analyses that have included it usually place it as a transitional form on a series of stem-tetrapods leading to crown-Tetrapoda. The shape of the cleithrum and the loss of the postbranchial lamina allow it to be placed higher than Acanthostega (and usually Ichthyostega as well), but the retention of a single-piece endochondral shoulder girdle usually means that it is not placed higher than Tulerpeton. The following is a simplified cladogram based on Ruta, Jeffery, & Coates (2003):

- - Elpistostege
  - - - Elginerpeton
      - Obruchevichthys
    - - Ventastega
      - Metaxygnathus
      - - Acanthostega
        - - Ichthyostega
          - - Hynerpeton
            - - Tulerpeton
              - - Whatcheeriidae
                - - Crassigyrinus
                  - - (Crownward taxa)

== Paleoecology ==
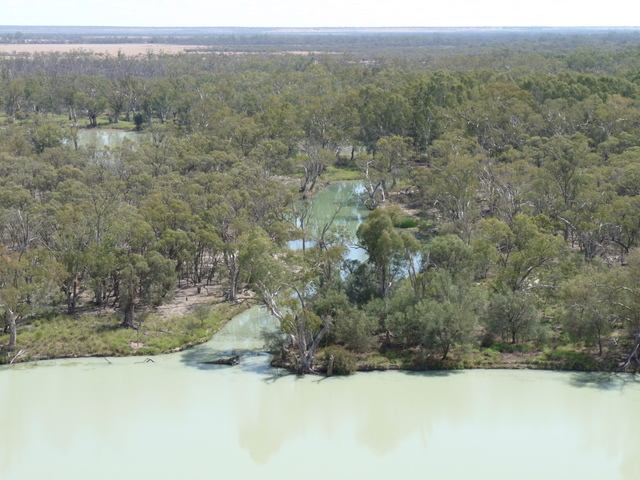
The modern day Murray River of Australia, a similar environment to the Catskill Formation during the Devonian

Hynerpeton was found at the Red Hill site of Pennsylvania. This roadcut preserved fossils from the Duncannon member of the Catskill Formation, which was laid down in an ancient coastal floodplain. During the late Devonian, the floodplain was close to the equator, so the climate was warm and humid, with a dry and wet season. It formed along the coast of a shallow sea which bisected the continent Euramerica, and was dominated by several small, slow rivers flowing down from the Acadian mountains in the eastern part of the continent. These rivers were prone to changing their course dramatically, creating oxbow lakes and ponds adjacent to the main river channels. The most abundant plants were forests of ancient broadleaf trees (Archaeopteris) supplemented with marshes filled with fern-like plants (Rhacophyton). Wildfires were common during the dry season, as evidenced by the large amount of charred Rhacophyton material. Other plants include lycopsids such as Lepidodendropsis and Otzinachsonia, as well as difficult-to-place herbs and shrubs such as Barinophyton and Gillespiea.

The animal life of Red Hill was also quite diverse. Early arachnids (Gigantocharinus), millipedes (Orsadesmus), and undescribed scorpions were among the few fully terrestrial members of the Red Hill fauna. The waterways were inhabited by a large variety of fish. Benthic placoderms such as the rare Phyllolepis, the common Groenlandaspis, and the abundant Turrisaspis were a large part of the fish assemblage. The early ray-finned fish Limnomis was also abundant, likely forming large schools. Early sharks were present, including the minuscule Ageleodus and the spine-finned Ctenacanthus. Various lobe-finned fish populated the floodplain, as well as the large acanthodian Gyracanthus. The apex predator of the assemblage was Hyneria, a 3-meter (10 feet) long tetrapodomorph fish.

Hynerpeton was not the only purported tetrapod at the site. A somewhat larger genus, Densignathus, coexisted alongside it. In addition, an unusual humerus incompatible with the endochondral shoulder girdle of Hynerpeton may show that a third genus lived in the floodplain. Skull fragments similar to those of whatcheeriids such as Pederpes and Whatcheeria may indicate that a fourth genus was also present, though their referral to whatcheeriids has been questioned. The depositional environment and fauna of the Red Hill site offered new hypotheses for the questions on why and how terrestriality evolved in stem-tetrapods. The Catskill floodplain never became dry enough for its waterways to completely dry up, but at certain times of the year shallow ponds became isolated from the main river channels. Terrestrial or semiaquatic animals could have used these ponds as refuge from the larger predatory fish which patrolled the deeper waterways. A modern equivalent would probably be the Murray River of Australia. In this subtropical modern environment experiencing wet and dry seasons, spawning golden perch (Macquaria ambigua) take refuge in oxbow lakes to escape larger, faster murray cod (Maccullochella peeli) in the main river channel. In a Devonian environment, vertebrates with terrestrial capabilities may have had the advantage when navigating between these different environments. The flexibility imparted by such a lifestyle could also have let them take advantage of a larger variety of food sources.

== See also ==
- Ichthyostega
- Acanthostega
