= Ricker model =

Discrete population dynamics model

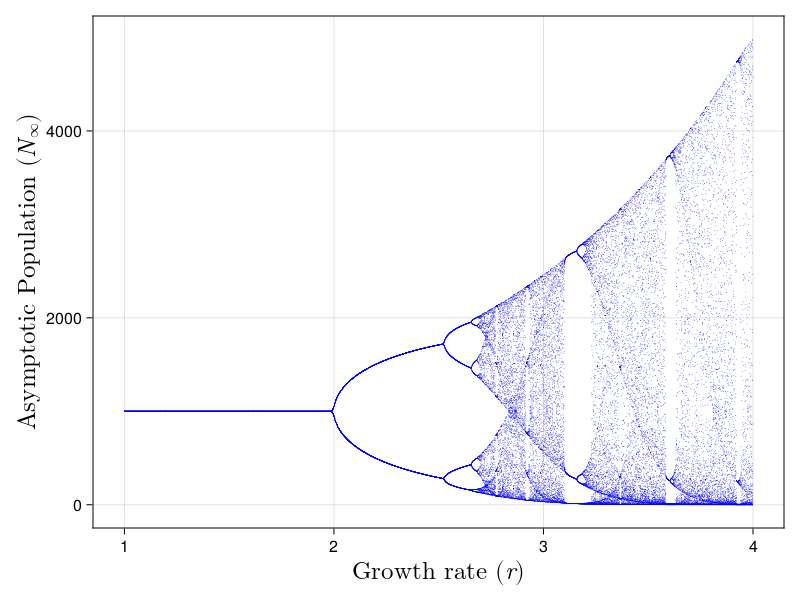
Bifurcation diagram of the Ricker model with carrying capacity of 1000

The Ricker model, named after Bill Ricker, is a classic discrete population model which gives the expected number N_{t+1} (or density) of individuals in generation t + 1 as a function of the number of individuals in the previous generation,

$$N_{t+1} = N_t e^{r\left(1-\frac{N_t}{k}\right)}.\,$$

Here r is interpreted as an intrinsic growth rate and k as the carrying capacity of the environment. Unlike some other models like the Logistic map, the carrying capacity in the Ricker model is not a hard barrier that cannot be exceeded by the population, but it only determines the overall scale of the population. The Ricker model was introduced in 1954 by Ricker in the context of stock and recruitment in fisheries.

The model can be used to predict the number of fish that will be present in a fishery. Subsequent work has derived the model under other assumptions such as scramble competition, within-year resource limited competition or even as the outcome of source-sink Malthusian patches linked by density-dependent dispersal. The Ricker model is a limiting case of the Hassell model which takes the form

$$N_{t+1} = k_1 \frac{N_t}{ \left(1+k_2 N_t\right)^c}.$$

When c = 1, the Hassell model is simply the Beverton–Holt model.

== See also ==
- Population dynamics of fisheries
