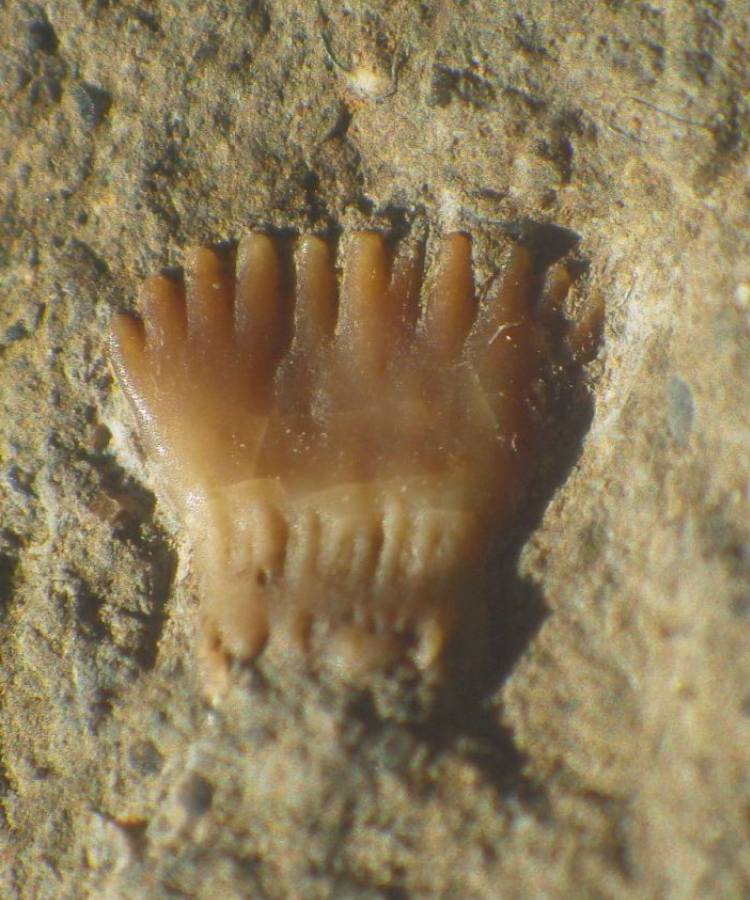
- Ageleodus pectinatus from the Carboniferous of Scotland

Scientific classification
- Kingdom: Animalia
- Phylum: Chordata
- Class: Chondrichthyes
- Subclass: †Euchondrocephali
- Family: †incertae sedis
- Genus: †Ageleodus; Owen, 1867
- Species: †A. pectinatus

Binomial name
- †Ageleodus pectinatus Agassiz 1838

Synonyms
- Ageleodus diadema Owen 1867; Callopristodus pectinatus; Ctenoptychius denticulatus Agassiz 1838; Ctenoptychius pectinatus

= Ageleodus =

Ageleodus Temporal range: Famennian–Westphalian

Extinct genus of cartilaginous fish

Ageleodus is an extinct genus of cartilaginous fish from the Paleozoic era. It is known from two species, both of which are based upon isolated teeth. A. pectinatus is known from the Carboniferous of Europe and North America. A. altus was described in 2006 from the Carboniferous of Australia. Four teeth from the Tournaisian deposits of Canning Basin probably present another Australian species although their shape is likely caused by physical wear rather than species features. This genus is also known from the Famennian of the Catskill formation at the Red Hill Site in Hyner, Pennsylvania. A study of 382 specimens from the site showed the strong heterodonty of this genus, which varies widely in tooth length and cusp number. This study described them as A. pectinatus, but the paper which described A. altus tentatively labeled them Ageleodus cf. A. altus. While generally considered a chondrichthyan, it has eluded classification into any known order or family.
