= Densignathus =

Densignathus Temporal range: Late Devonian

Scientific classification
- Domain: Eukaryota
- Kingdom: Animalia
- Phylum: Chordata
- Clade: Sarcopterygii
- Clade: Tetrapodomorpha
- Clade: Stegocephali
- Genus: †Densignathus; Daeschler, 2000

Type species
- †D. rowei Daeschler, 2000

Extinct genus of tetrapodomorphs

Densignathus is an extinct genus of early stem-tetrapod from the Late Devonian-aged Catskill Formation of Pennsylvania in the United States. A lower jaw has been found from the Red Hill fossil site, which is known for a diversity of lobe-finned fishes and other early tetrapods like Hynerpeton. The type species, Densignathus rowei, was named in honor of paleontologist Norman Douglas Rowe in 2000.
