= Michael Hassell =

Michael Patrick Hassell CBE FRS (born 2 August 1942) is a British biologist, noted for his work in population ecology, especially in insects. He is a professor at Imperial College London.

Hassell was born in Tel Aviv, the son of Albert and Ruth Hassell and was educated at Whitgift School, Croydon. He studied zoology at the University of Cambridge and received his Ph.D degree from the University of Oxford in 1967. He later worked as a research fellow at the University of California, Berkeley and at Oxford. Hassell joined Imperial College London in 1970 as a lecturer. He became a reader in 1975 and was named Professor of Insect Ecology in 1979. Hassell became dean of the Imperial College campus at Silwood Park in 1988 and Head of the Department of Biology and Biochemistry in 1993. He was appointed the first principal of the Faculty of Life Sciences in 2001.

Hassell has worked extensively in the population ecology of insects using mathematical models as well as field and laboratory work to study the dynamics of insect populations, particularly insect host-parasitoid interactions.

Hassell was elected as a fellow of the Royal Society in 1987. He served on its council from 1994 to 1996. Hassell is also a fellow of the Academia Europaea, a trustee of the Natural History Museum, a member of the Natural Environment Research Council, and a member of the council of the Zoological Society of London. He was president of the Royal Entomological Society from 2016-2018 and a past president of the British Ecological Society.

Hassell became a Commander of the Order of the British Empire in 2002 when he was named on the Queen's Birthday Honours list. He received a President’s Medal from the British Ecological Society.

He married twice; firstly in 1966 to Glynis M. Everett and secondly in 1982 to Victoria A Taylor. He has three sons and a daughter.

== See also ==
- Hassell model
