= Contest competition =

In ecology, contest competition refers to a situation where available resources, such as food and mates, are utilized only by one or a few individuals, thus preventing development or reproduction of other individuals. It refers to a hypothetical situation in which several individuals stage a contest for which one eventually emerges victorious. Contest competition is the opposite of scramble competition, a situation in which available resources are shared equally among individuals.

As contest competition allows the monopolization of resources, offspring will typically always be produced and survive until adulthood independent of the population size, resulting in stable population dynamics. This is in stark contrast to scramble competition which can result in periodic or chaotic population dynamics. The Beverton–Holt model is often used to represent population dynamics arising from contest competition. This model, and a few other well-known population models, can be explicitly derived from individual-level processes assuming contest competition and a random distribution of individuals among resources.

Contest competition has been observed in a variety of species. In white-faced monkeys, Cebus capucinus, regardless of aggression, avoidance, or sex, higher ranking monkeys had higher energy intake within their group. For female Microcebus murinus groups, if the resource (fruit) could be monopolized, they would compete within their group for it. In a controlled lab experiment with three parasitic wasp species (Dinarmus basalis, Anisopteromalus calandrae, and Heterospilus prosopidis) they found that between the first larvae in the host and the second, the larvae that would win depended on the time between them. There was also a Nicholson–Bailey model made to partially explain the relationship between Heterospilus prosopidis and its host Callosobruchus maculatus.

Fitness gains for the winner of the contest is not always known. For example, in mountain gorillas, Gorilla beringei, higher ranking females had higher average food-site resident times and higher aggression and avoidance while eating than lower ranking females. Higher ranking females have higher reproductive success, but both energy intake and the energy needed for travel to the food site do not differ among ranks.

Other research in contest competition focuses on what aspects are relevant for contest resolution. In a study looking at aerial wars of attrition in territorial insects, they found that the energy Cuterebra austeni got from their resources before adulthood played a role in who won. Some species have obvious gains when they win, but no morphological and/or physiological tell to determine who would win. This is the case with several species of butterflies where males hold a contest over territory. However, a study in 2010 that staged contests between male Pararge aegeria found motivation to be a factor. The more time a male spent with a female, the more persistent they were, which increased the likelihood of the male to win the contest over the previous male holding dominance over the territory.

== See also ==
- Intraspecific competition
- Scramble competition
