= Beverton–Holt model =

Discrete-time population model

The Beverton–Holt model is a classic discrete-time population model which gives the expected number n_{t+1} (or density) of individuals in generation t + 1 as a function of the number of individuals in the previous generation,

$$n_{t+1} = \frac{R_0 n_t}{1+ n_t/M}.$$

Here R_{0} is interpreted as the proliferation rate per generation and K = (R_{0} − 1) M is the carrying capacity of the environment. The Beverton–Holt model was introduced in the context of fisheries by Beverton & Holt (1957). Subsequent work has derived the model under other assumptions such as contest competition (Brännström & Sumpter 2005), within-year resource limited competition (Geritz & Kisdi 2004) or even as the outcome of a source-sink Malthusian patches linked by density-dependent dispersal (Bravo de la Parra et al. 2013). The Beverton–Holt model can be generalized to include scramble competition (see the Ricker model, the Hassell model and the Maynard Smith–Slatkin model). It is also possible to include a parameter reflecting the spatial clustering of individuals (see Brännström & Sumpter 2005).

Despite being nonlinear, the model can be solved explicitly, since it is in fact an inhomogeneous linear equation in 1/n. The solution is

$$n_t = \frac{K n_0}{n_0 + (K - n_0) R_0^{-t}}.$$

Because of this structure, the model can be considered as the discrete-time analogue of the continuous-time logistic equation for population growth introduced by Verhulst; for comparison, the logistic equation is

$$\frac{dN}{dt} = rN \left( 1 - \frac{N}{K} \right),$$

and its solution is

$$N(t) = \frac{K N(0)}{N(0) + (K - N(0)) e^{-rt}}.$$
