= Hyner, Pennsylvania =

Unincorporated community in Pennsylvania, US

- Unincorporated community
- Location within Pennsylvania
- Coordinates: 41°19′54″N 77°38′39″W
- Country: United States
- State: Pennsylvania
- County: Clinton
- Elevation: 643 ft (196 m)
- Time zone: UTC-5 (Eastern (EST))
  - Summer (DST): UTC-4 (EDT)
- Area codes: 272 & 570
- GNIS feature ID: 1177668

Hyner is an unincorporated community which is located in Clinton County, Pennsylvania, United States. The community is located along the West Branch Susquehanna River and Pennsylvania Route 120 5.6 miles (9.0 km) east of Renovo.

== Demographics ==
Historical population
Census	Pop.	Note	%±

The United States Census Bureau defined Hyner as a census designated place (CDP) in 2023.

== Fossil discoveries ==
Fossils of extinct species have been found in the Catskill Formation of the Red Hill Shale, dating to the upper Devonian (365 to 363 million years ago); these species incorporate "Hyner" in their genus names: Hyneria, a predatory lobe-finned fish, and Hynerpeton, an early four-limbed vertebrate that lived in the rivers and ponds.
