= Moment closure =

In probability theory, moment closure is an approximation method used to estimate moments of a stochastic process.

== Introduction ==
Typically, differential equations describing the i-th moment will depend on the (i + 1)-st moment. To use moment closure, a level is chosen past which all cumulants are set to zero. This leaves a resulting closed system of equations which can be solved for the moments. The approximation is particularly useful in models with a very large state space, such as stochastic population models.

== History ==
The moment closure approximation was first used by Goodman and Whittle who set all third and higher-order cumulants to be zero, approximating the population distribution with a normal distribution.

In 2006, Singh and Hespanha proposed a closure which approximates the population distribution as a log-normal distribution to describe biochemical reactions.

== Applications ==
The approximation has been used successfully to model the spread of the Africanized bee in the Americas, nematode infection in ruminants. and quantum tunneling in ionization experiments.
