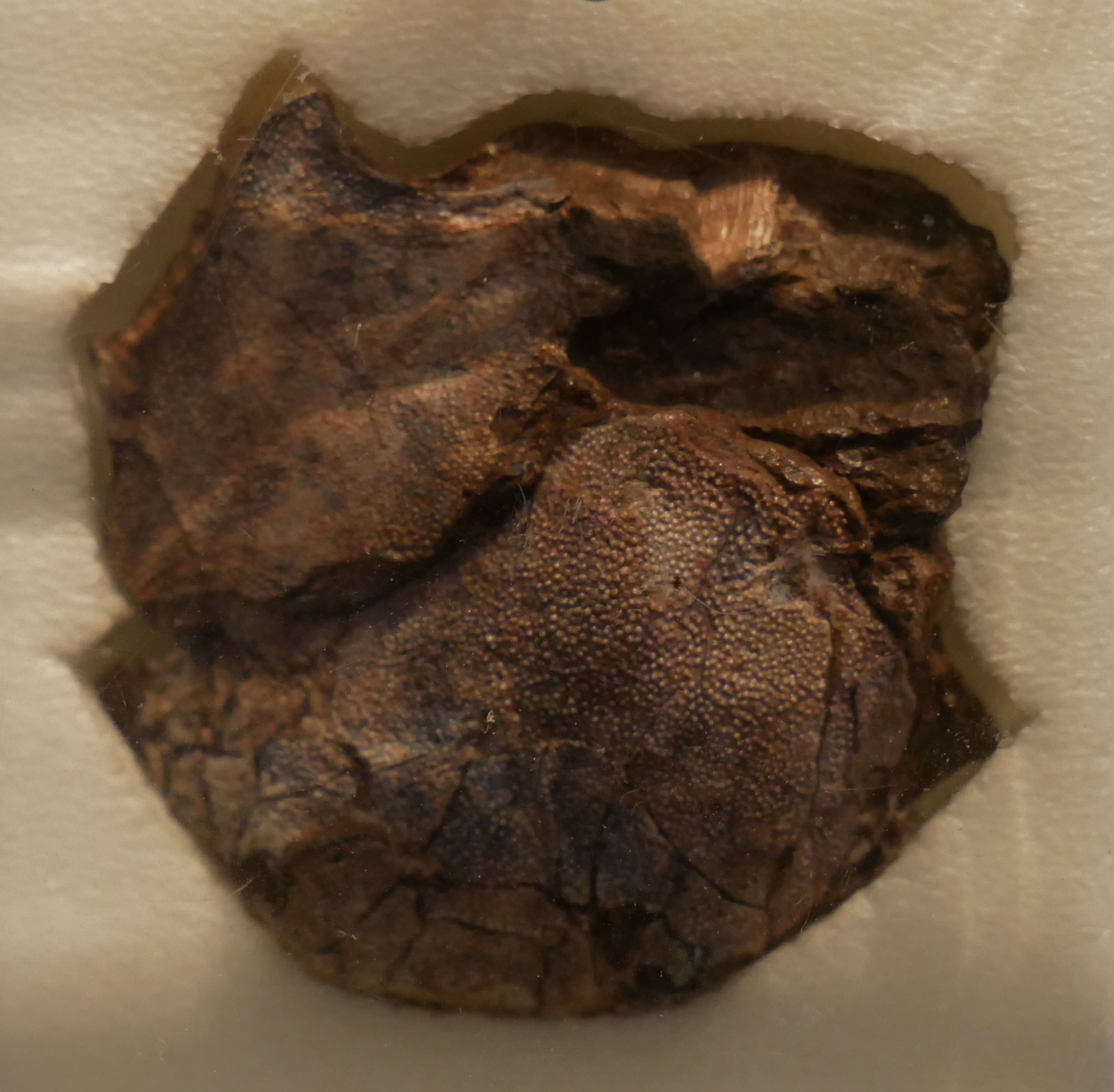
- Turrisaspis elektor head shield, Academy of Natural Sciences of Drexel University

Scientific classification
- Kingdom: Animalia
- Phylum: Chordata
- Class: †Placodermi
- Order: †Arthrodira
- Family: †Groenlandaspididae
- Genus: †Turrisaspis

Type species
- Turrisaspis elektor Daeschler, Furmes & Mullison, 2003

= Turrisaspis =

Turrisaspis Temporal range: Late Devonian

Extinct genus of fishes

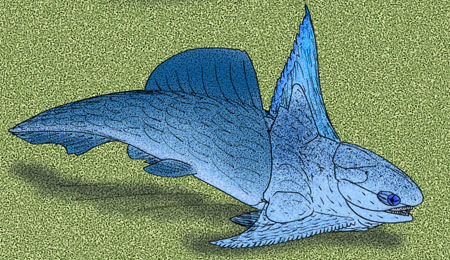
Artist's reconstruction

Turrisaspis is an extinct genus of groenlandaspid arthrodire placoderm . It is known only from trunk fragments from the Catskill Formation from the Upper Devonian of Clinton County, Pennsylvania .
