= Scramble competition =

Mechanism of sexual selection

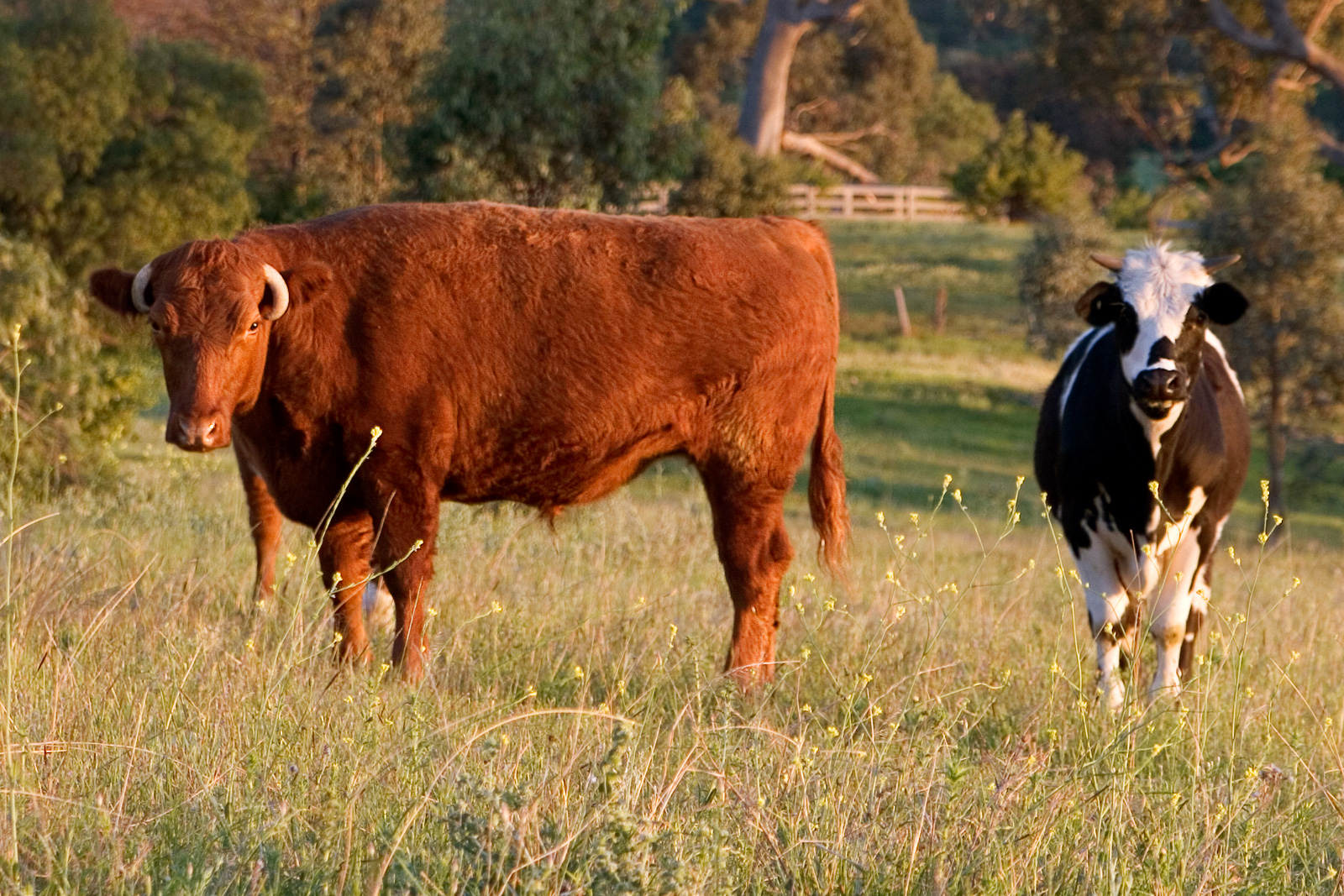
Grass can be a limited resource for grazing cows

In ecology, scramble competition (or complete symmetric competition or exploitation competition) refers to a situation in which a resource is accessible to all competitors (that is, it is not monopolizable by an individual or group). However, since the particular resource is usually finite, scramble competition may lead to decreased survival rates for all competitors if the resource is used to its carrying capacity. Scramble competition is also defined as when a "finite resource is shared equally amongst the competitors so that the quantity of food per individual declines with increasing population density". A further description of scramble competition is "competition for a resource that is inadequate for the needs of all, but which is partitioned equally among contestants, so that no competitor obtains the amount it needs and all would die in extreme cases."

== Types of intraspecific competition ==
Researchers recognize two main forms of intraspecific competition, where members of a species are all using a shared resource in short supply. These are contest competition and scramble competition.

=== Contest competition ===
Contest competition is a form of competition where there is a winner and a loser and where resources can be attained completely or not at all. Contest competition sets up a situation where "each successful competitor obtains all resources it requires for survival or reproduction". Here "contest" refers to the fact that physical action plays an active role in securing the resource. Contest competition involves resources that are stable, i.e. food or mates. Contests can be for a ritual objective such as territory or status, and losers may return to the competition another day to try again.

=== Scramble competition ===
In scramble competition resources are limited, which may lead to group member starvation. Contest competition is often the result of aggressive social domains, including hierarchies or social chains. Conversely, scramble competition is what occurs by accident when competitors naturally want the same resources. These two forms of competition can be interwoven into one another. Some researchers have noted parallels between intraspecific behaviors of competition and cooperation. These two processes can be evolutionarily adopted and they can also be accidental, which makes sense given the aggressive competition and collaborative cooperation aspects of social behavior in humans and animals. To date, few studies have looked at the interplay between contest and scramble competition, despite the fact that they do not occur in isolation. There appears to be little understanding of the interface between contest competition and scramble competition in insects. Much research still needs to be conducted concerning the overlap of contest and scramble competition systems. Contests can arise within a scramble competition system and conversely, scramble competition "may play a role in a system characterized by interference".

== Population effects ==
Population can be greatly affected by scramble competition (and contest competition). Intraspecific competition normally leads to a decline of organisms. For example, the more time that an individual spends seeking food and reproduction opportunities, the less energy that organism naturally has to defend oneself against predators, resulting in a "zero-sum game". Competition is a density dependent effect, and scramble competition is no exception. Scramble competition usually involves interactions among individuals of the same species, which makes competition balanced and often leads to a decline of population growth rate as the amount of resources depletes.

The Ricker Model, is used to model scramble competition. It was originally formulated to study the growth of salmon populations and is given by the equation P_{n+1} = R(P_{n}) = P_{n}e^{r(1-P_{n}/k)}, where P_{n} is the population at the nth time period, r is the Malthusian growth rate, and k is the carrying capacity of the population. The Ricker model, and a few other well-known population models, can be explicitly derived from individual-level processes assuming scramble competition and a random distribution of individuals among resources.

Some researchers have noted that in certain species, such as the horseshoe crab, males are most successful at mating when they are able to practice scramble competition polygyny where they do not defend their territory but rather mate and move on, thus providing the highest likelihood of species survival and reproductive prowess.

== Examples ==
There are many examples of scramble competition within the environment. For example, cows grazing in a grassland could be operating under a scramble competition. This illustration of cows eating grass is scramble competition because there are limited resources, there is only so much grass to be eaten before all the food resource is depleted. Additionally, there is no way that others can limit the amount of resources or the access to resources that the other cows receive.

Another example of scramble competition is forest defoliators. If their larvae can find shelter and food then survival is possible, but when all the foliage is destroyed then the population decreases. Their synchronized life cycle increases competition for specific resources; this greatly affects their ability to receive resources including food and shelter due to the overwhelming population increase at certain times of the year.

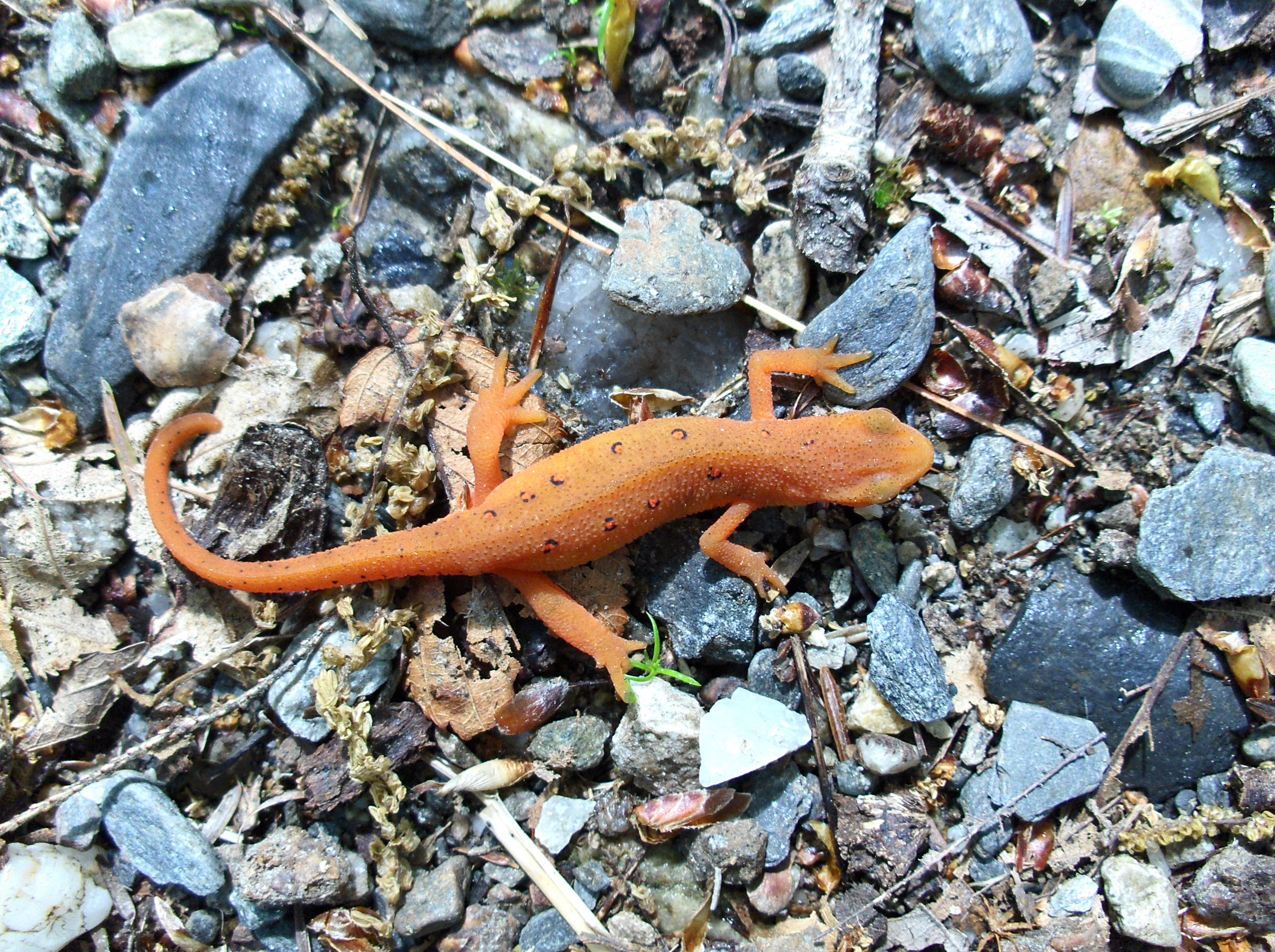
The red spotted newt exhibits sexual dimorphism

Scramble competition can also be seen with the example of red spotted newts. Charles Darwin (1871) first explored the concept of "sexual dimorphism" which states that, "most sexually dimorphic species are also the most polygynous" which would enable males to "outcompete other males through female choice, combat, or scrambles to encounter females would be favored by selection, and sexual dimorphism would result". The key to red-spotted newts increased success in scramble competition is the newts enhanced or strengthened tailfins.

Another example of scramble competition is the success of small beetles over large beetles. While larger beetles, similar to larger animals in general, tend to win more often in contest competition, the opposite can be true in a scramble competition. Specifically with beetles, scramble competition is dependent on male movement and locomotion so that the beetle that can move faster is more likely to be successful in attaining resources, mates and food. Smaller beetles fare better in scramble competition for shelter, which could one day lead to the evolutionary adaptation of smaller beetle structures for survival purposes. The flux of contest and scramble competition in this example is important to note because it truly depends on the context of each individual to determine which type of competition is most suitable.

Scramble competition also exists in lepidopterans. For example, male mourning cloak butterflies will fly around in search for widely dispersed females.

Another example of scramble competition exists in Lactrodectus hesperus, the western black widow spider. There is a male-bias or skew within the sexually active population of this species, which means that females are a finite "resource". So, while no male has a monopoly over the females, the males who reach the female first will come out on top in the world of sexual reproduction.

== See also ==
- Beverton–Holt model
- Size-asymmetric competition
