= Ted Daeschler =

American paleontologist

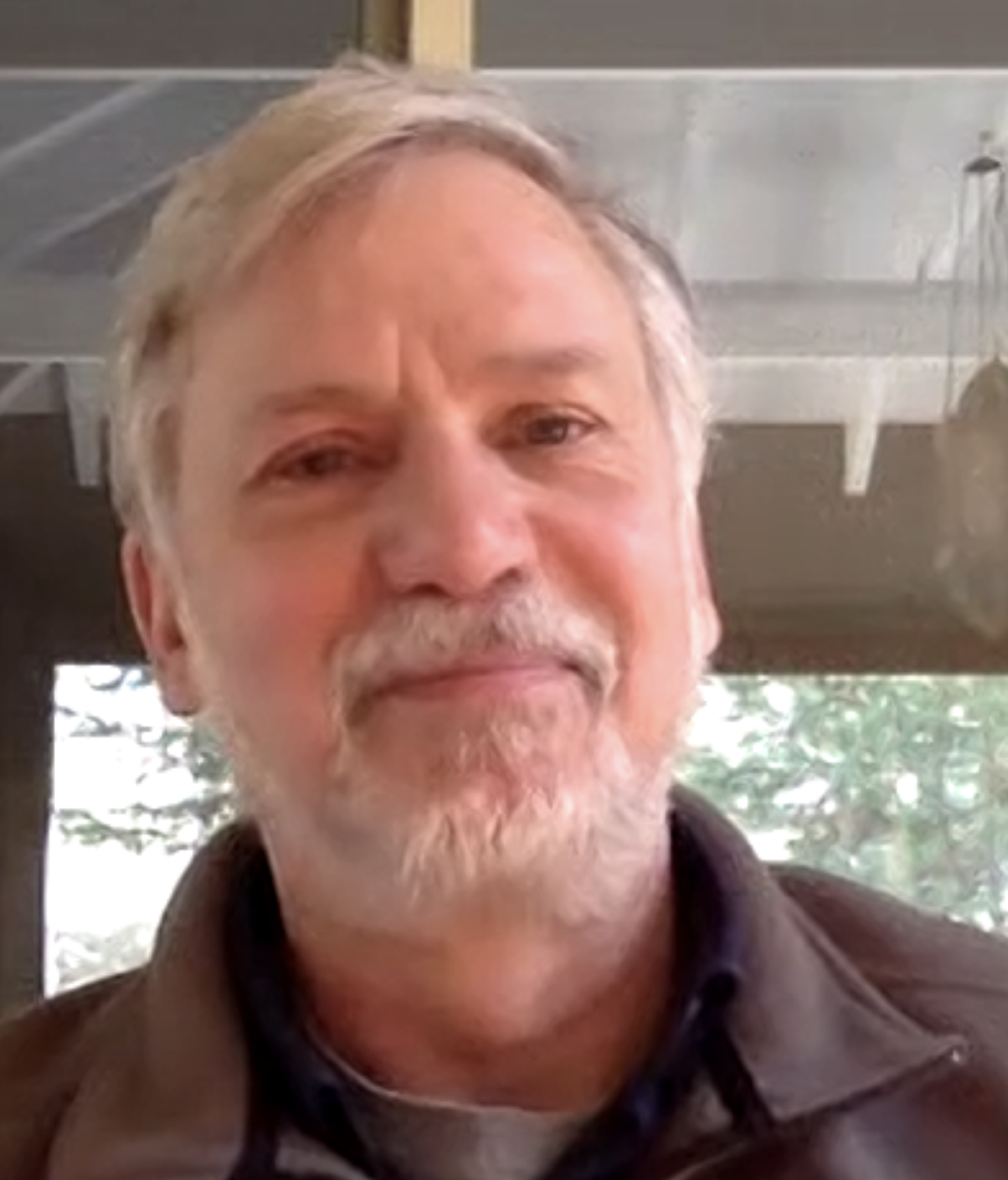
- Education: University of Pennsylvania, Franklin & Marshall College, Pingry School
- Occupation: Paleontologist; teacher
- Awards: Hayden Memorial Geological Award (2007)
- Academic career
- Institutions: Academy of Natural Sciences of Drexel University; Drexel University

Edward B. 'Ted' Daeschler is an American vertebrate paleontologist and Associate Curator and Chair of Vertebrate Biology at the Academy of Natural Sciences in Philadelphia. He is a specialist in fish paleontology, especially in the Late Devonian, and in the development of the first limbed vertebrates. He is the discoverer of the transitional fossil tetrapod Hynerpeton bassetti, and a Devonian fish-like specimen of Sauripterus taylori with fingerlike appendages, and was also part of a team of researchers that discovered the transitional fossil Tiktaalik.

He received a Ph.D. from the University of Pennsylvania in 1998. He has held recent research grants from the National Science Foundation, the National Geographic Society, and other donors. He is also known for his work on the preservation of natural history collections. He is a professor at Drexel University in the Department of Biodiversity, Earth and Environmental Science.

== Selected publications ==
- Daeschler, E. B. and N. H. Shubin. 1998. Fish with Fingers?. Nature 391:133.
- Daeschler, E. B. 2000. An early actinopterygian fish from the Upper Devonian Catskill Formation in Pennsylvania, USA. Proceedings of the Academy of Natural Sciences 150:181-192.
- Daeschler, E. B. 2000. Early tetrapod jaws from the Late Devonian of Pennsylvania, USA. Journal of Paleontology 74(2):301-308.
- Ahlberg, P. E., Z. Johanson, and E. B. Daeschler. 2001. The Late Devonian lungfish Soederberghia (Sarcopterygii, Dipnoi) from Australia and North America, and its biogeographic implications. Journal of Vertebrate Paleontology 21(1):1-12.
- Davis, M., N. H. Shubin, E. B. Daeschler. 2001. Immature rhizodontids from the Devonian of North America. Bulletin of the Museum of Comparative Zoology 156(1):171-187.
- Downs, J.P. and E.B. Daeschler. 2001. Variation within a large sample of Ageleodus pectinatus teeth (Chondichthyes) from the Late Devonian of Pennsylvania, U.S.A. Journal of Vertebrate Paleontology 21(4):811-814.
- Daeschler, E. B., A. Frumes and C. F. Mullison. 2003. Groenlandaspidid placoderm fishes from Late Devonian of North America. Records of the Australian Museum.55(1):45-60.
- Shubin, N. H., E. B. Daeschler and M. I. Coates. 2004. The early evolution of the tetrapod humerus. Science 304(5667):90-93.
- Davis, M., N. H. Shubin, and E. B. Daeschler. 2004. A new specimen of Sauripterus taylori (Sarcopterygii; Osteichthyes) from the Famennian Catskill Formation of North America. Journal of Vertebrate Paleontology 24(1):26-40.
- Wilson, H. M., E. B. Daeschler and S. Desbiens. 2005. New flat-backed archipolypodan millipedes from the Upper Devonian of North America. Journal of Paleontology 79(4):737-743.
- Friedman, M. and E. B. Daeschler. 2006. Late Devonian (Famennian) lungfishes from the Catskill Formation of Pennsylvania, USA. Palaeontology 49(6):1-17.
- Shubin, N. H., E. B. Daeschler and F.A. Jenkins, Jr. 2006. The pectoral fin of Tiktaalik roseae and the origin of the tetrapod limb. Nature 440:764-771.
- Daeschler, E. B., N. H. Shubin and F. A. Jenkins, Jr. 2006. A Devonian tetrapod-like fish and the evolution of the tetrapod body plan. Nature 440:757-763.
- Downs, J. P., E.B. Daeschler, F. A. Jenkins, Jr, and N. H. Shubin. 2008. The cranial endoskeleton of Tiktaalik roseae. Nature 445:925-929.
- Daeschler, E. B., J. A. Clack, and N. H. Shubin. 2009. Late Devonian tetrapod remains from Red Hill, Pennsylvania, USA: how much diversity?. Acta Zoologica 90:306-317.
