= Catskill Formation =

Unit of sedimentary rock in the US

- Stratigraphic range: Late Devonian (Late Famennian)
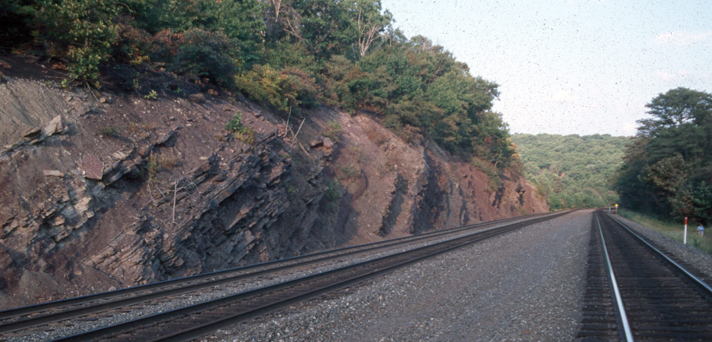
- Outcrop of the Irish Valley Member of the Catskill Formation along the Horseshoe Curve, Blair County, Pennsylvania
- Type: sedimentary
- Underlies: Rockwell Formation, Huntley Mountain Formation, Pocono Formation, Spechty Kopf Formation
- Overlies: Foreknobs Formation, Lock Haven Formation, Trimmers Rock Formation
- Thickness: Up to 10,000 ft (3,000 m)

Lithology
- Primary: Sandstone
- Other: Siltstone, shale

Location
- Region: Appalachian Mountains
- Country: United States
- Extent: Pennsylvania, New York (state)

Type section
- Named for: Catskill Mountains, New York

The Devonian Catskill Formation or the Catskill Clastic Wedge is a unit of mostly terrestrial sedimentary rock found in Pennsylvania and New York. Minor marine layers exist in this thick rock unit (up to 10,000 feet (3,000 m)). It is equivalent to the Hampshire Formation of Maryland, West Virginia, and Virginia.

The Catskill is the largest bedrock unit of the Upper Devonian in northeast Pennsylvania and the Catskill region of New York, from which its name is derived. The Pocono Mountains of Pennsylvania are largely underlain by this unit as well. The rocks of the Catskill are a clastic wedge of predominantly red sandstone, indicating a large-scale terrestrial deposition during the Acadian orogeny. Many beds are cyclical in nature, preserving the record of a dynamic environment during its approximately 20 million years of deposition.

The Catskill Formation preserves a highly diverse paleobiota, including many early sarcopterygians (especially tetrapodomorphs), providing important evidence about the evolution of terrestrial vertebrates. The formation also provides important fossils about the evolution of land plants.

== Geology ==
=== Depositional environment ===
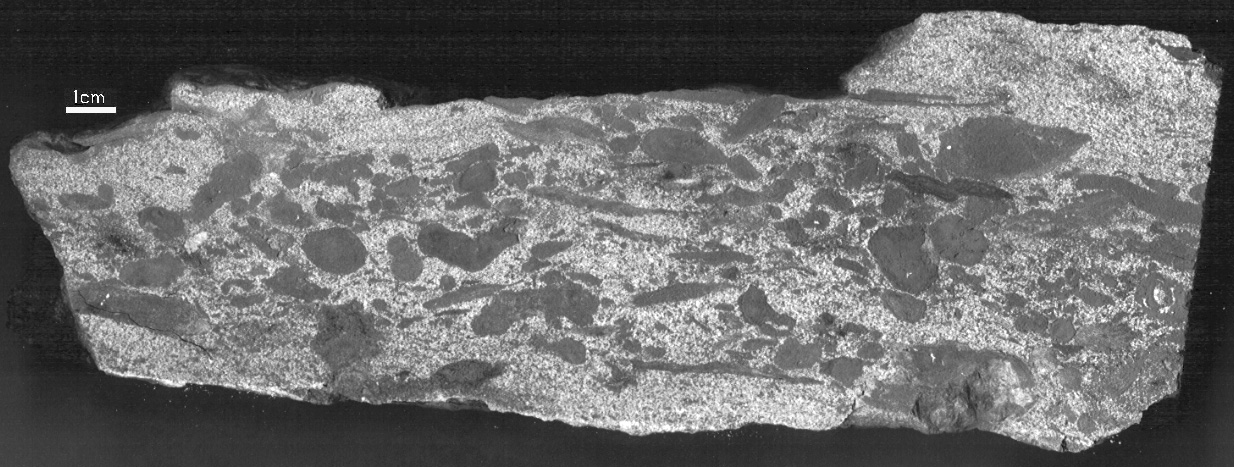
Cut slab of the Catskill Formation from the Coleman Quarry of the Endless Mountain Stone Company, Susquehanna County, Pennsylvania, showing mud clasts within sandstone

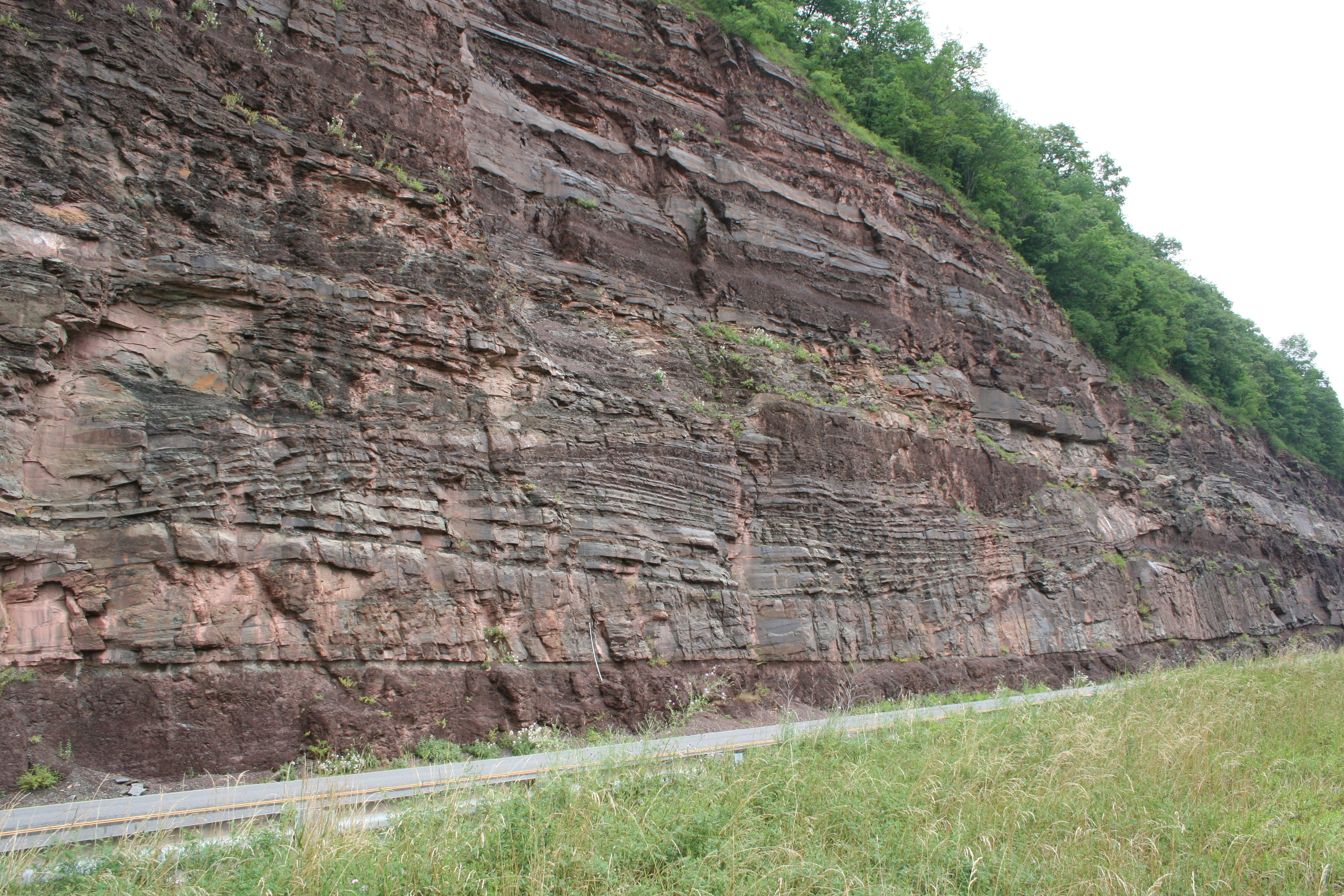
Point bar deposits in the Catskill Formation (Devonian) near North Bend, PA.

During the Devonian period, the Catskill Delta was formed by a series of river deltas and otherwise marshy terrain. This terrain was sandwiched between the epicontinental Kaskaskia Sea in central North America and the now-vanished Acadian Mountains. Erosion brought sediment from the mountain westwards into the sea, forming the deltas.

Eventually, the Delta formation was buried and transformed into sandstone, which was then revealed in places when the Catskill and Appalachian Mountains were formed at a later date. This transformation and uncovering is the primary reason why the Catskill Delta is notable in the present. Western Pennsylvania's petroleum was formed as a consequence. This was the first major oil region to be developed.

The Catskill was once considered to be related to the Old Red Sandstone, but in actuality, the two are only coincidentally similar. Both formed at approximately the same time, and under similar conditions: to the north of the Acadian Mountains were the Caledonian Mountains, and a similar region of marsh and river delta formed there.

=== Glacial erosion ===
Though both mountain ranges were formed during the Acadian orogeny, the Catskill Mountains, unlike the Appalachian Mountains underwent glacial erosion. Much of what formed the Catskills as they stand today is a result of the Wisconsin glaciation which ended only about 12,000 years ago.

There are many signs of the Glacial period event which carved the current day Catskill Mountains.

These markers include:

- Glacial Erratics such as the Devils Tombstone
- Striations
- "Dance Floors" such as Pratt Rock
- Terminal moraines

=== Members ===
==== Eastern Pennsylvania ====
Towamensing, Walcksville, Beaverdam Run, Long Run, Packerton, Poplar Gap, Sawmill Run, Berry Run, Clarks Ferry, and Duncannon.

==== Central Pennsylvania ====
Irish Valley, Sherman Creek, Buddys Run, Clarks Ferry, and Duncannon.

Geologic cross section of upper to middle Devonian strata from Cherry Valley, New York, south-southwest across the Allegheny Plateau and then along the Ridge-and-Valley Appalachians to Tennessee. The Catskill Formation is at the top.

== Paleobiota ==
Color key: Taxon / Reclassified taxon / Taxon falsely reported as present / Dubious taxon or junior synonym / Ichnotaxon / Ootaxon / Morphotaxon	Notes; Uncertain or tentative taxa are in small text; ~~crossed out~~ taxa are discredited.

=== Plants ===
Plantae
Name	Species	Locality	Material	Notes	Images
Taeniocrada	sp	Catskill Formatiom, Potter County	>80 Specimens		
Barinophyton	citrulliforme	Catskill Formation, Potter County, Pennsylvania	>20 specimens		
	cf. obscurum	Catskill Formation, Potter County, Pennsylvania			
	ssp.	Catskill Formation, Potter County, Pennsylvania	>100 Specimens		
Protobarinophyton	P. pennsylvanicum	Catskill Formation, Potter County, Pennsylvania	2 Specimens of megaspore	The genus these spore are attached to belong to an early group of land plants from the Silurian.	
Rhacophyton					
Lycopsida	Indeterminate	Catskill Formation, Potter County, Pennsylvania	8 Specimens		
Archaeopteris	A.ssp	Catskill Formation, Potter County, Pennsylvania	>160 Specimens	One of the earliest known large "tree" like plants to take root	

=== Invertebrates ===
Protostomes
Name	Species	Locality	Material	Notes	Images
Lingula	sp	Catskill Formation, Potter County, Pennsylvania	1 Specimen		
Gigantocharinus	G.szatmaryi	Red Hill Locality, Clinton County, Pennsylvainia	Holotype consists of an extremely well preserved exoskeleton and a few impressions.	The genus has helped begin bridging the gap between its family's missing record from the Middle Devonian to the Late Carboniferous.	
Orsadesmus	O.rubecollus	Red Hill Locality, Clinton County, Pennsylvainia	Holotype is an impression of the exoskeleton	The species was described alongside the Quebec genus Zanclodesmus, forming a new family within the broad flat keeled members of the order Archidesmida.	
Hallipterus	H.excelcior	Catskill Formation, Wyoming County, Pennsylvania			
Adelophthalmus	A.ssp	Catskill Formation, Potter County, Pennsylvania	1 Specimen	It was described in 2002 by W. E. Stein (2002) as an indeterminate Eurypterid, it was then redescribed as an indeterminate species of Adelophthalmus in 2022 by R. E. Plotnick (2022).	

=== Placoderms ===
Placoderms of the Catskill Formation
Genus	Species	Presence	Material	Notes	Images
Bothriolepis	B. sp.	Mansfield, Tioga County, Pennsylvania	Abundant material, including mass mortality of hatchlings.	A bothriolepidid. Species unknown, though sometimes referred to as B. nitida.	
Groenlandaspis	G. pennsylvanica			A groenlandaspidid.	
Phyllolepis	P. rossimontina			A phyllolepidid.	
Phyllolepis	P. thomsoni		Articulated skeleton.	A phyllolepidid.	
Turrisaspis	T. elektor			A groenlandaspidid.	

=== Acanthodians ===
Acanthodians of the Catskill Formation
Genus	Species	Presence	Material	Notes	Images
Gyracanthus	G. cf. sherwoodi			A gyracanthid.	

=== Chondrichthyans ===
Chondrichthyans of the Catskill Formation
Genus	Species	Presence	Material	Notes	Images
Ageleodus	A. pectinatus	Red Hill Locality, Clinton County, Pennsylvainia	Teeth	A holocephalan of uncertain affinities.	
Ctenacanthus	C. sp.			A ctenacanthiform elasmobranch.	

=== Actinopterygians ===
Actinopterygians of the Catskill Formation
Genus	Species	Presence	Material	Notes	Images
Limnomis	L. delaneyi	Red Hill, Clinton County, Pennsylvania	Holotype is a compressed skull.	An early ray-finned fish.	

=== Sarcopterygians ===
Sarcopterygians of the Catskill Formation
Genus	Species	Presence	Material	Notes	Images
Apatorhynchus	A. opistheretmus	Apatorhynchus-type locality, Tioga County, Pennsylvania	Holotype is a partial skull, 1 specimen.	A lungfish of uncertain affinities.	
Densignathus	D. rowei			A stegocephalian tetrapodomorph.	
Eusthenodon	E. bourdoni			A tristichopterid tetrapodomorph.	
Eusthenodon	E. leganihanne			A tristichopterid tetrapodomorph.	
Hyneria	H. lindae	Red Hill Site, Clinton County, Pennsylvainia	Holotype is a disarticulated skull and 3D body fossil.	A tristichopterid tetrapodomorph.	
Hynerpeton	H. bassetti			A stegocephalian tetrapodomorph.	
Langlieria	L. radiata			A tristichopterid tetrapodomorph. Originally identified as Holoptychius.	
Langlieria	L. smalingi	Irish Valley Member		A tristichopterid tetrapodomorph. Originally identified as Holoptychius.	
Megalichthys	M. mullisoni			A megalichthyid tetrapodomorph.	
Sauripterus	S. taylori	Sherman Creek Locality, Lycoming County, Pennsylvainia	The Holotype is an articulated limb and 3 scales, there are 3 individuals.	A rhizodontid tetrapodomorph.	
Soederberghia	S. groenlandica	Catskill Formation, Lycoming County, Pennsylvania		A rhynchodipterid lungfish.	
Sterropterygion	S. brandei			An indeterminate osteolepiform tetrapodomorph.	
